= Wigford =

Area of Lincoln in Lincolnshire England

Coordinates: 53.226789°N 0.542766°W

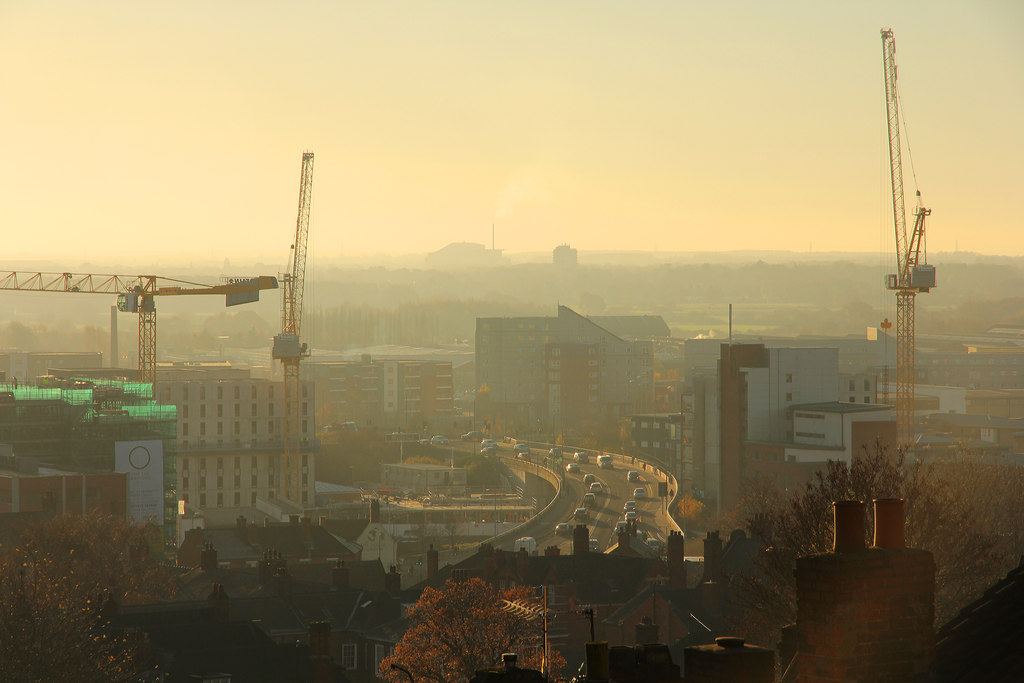
- Wigford Way, Lincoln

- Location within Lincolnshire
  - London: 157 mi (253 km) S
- Civil parish: Unparished
- District: Lincoln
- Shire county: Lincolnshire
- Region: East Midlands
- Country: England
- Sovereign state: United Kingdom
- Post town: Lincoln
- Postcode district: LN5
- Dialling code: 01522
- Police: Lincolnshire
- Fire: Lincolnshire
- Ambulance: East Midlands
- UK Parliament: Lincoln

Wigford is a historic district of Lincoln in the county of Lincolnshire, England. It is located to the south of the city centre and incorporates parts of the Cornhill Quarter and the High Street. It is also home to the oldest active parish church in Lincoln, St Mary le Wigford, as well as Lincoln railway station.
