= Lincoln, England =

Cathedral city in Lincolnshire, England

Lincoln Lindon, Lindum Colonia
- Cathedral city and non-metropolitan district
- Lincoln/City of Lincoln
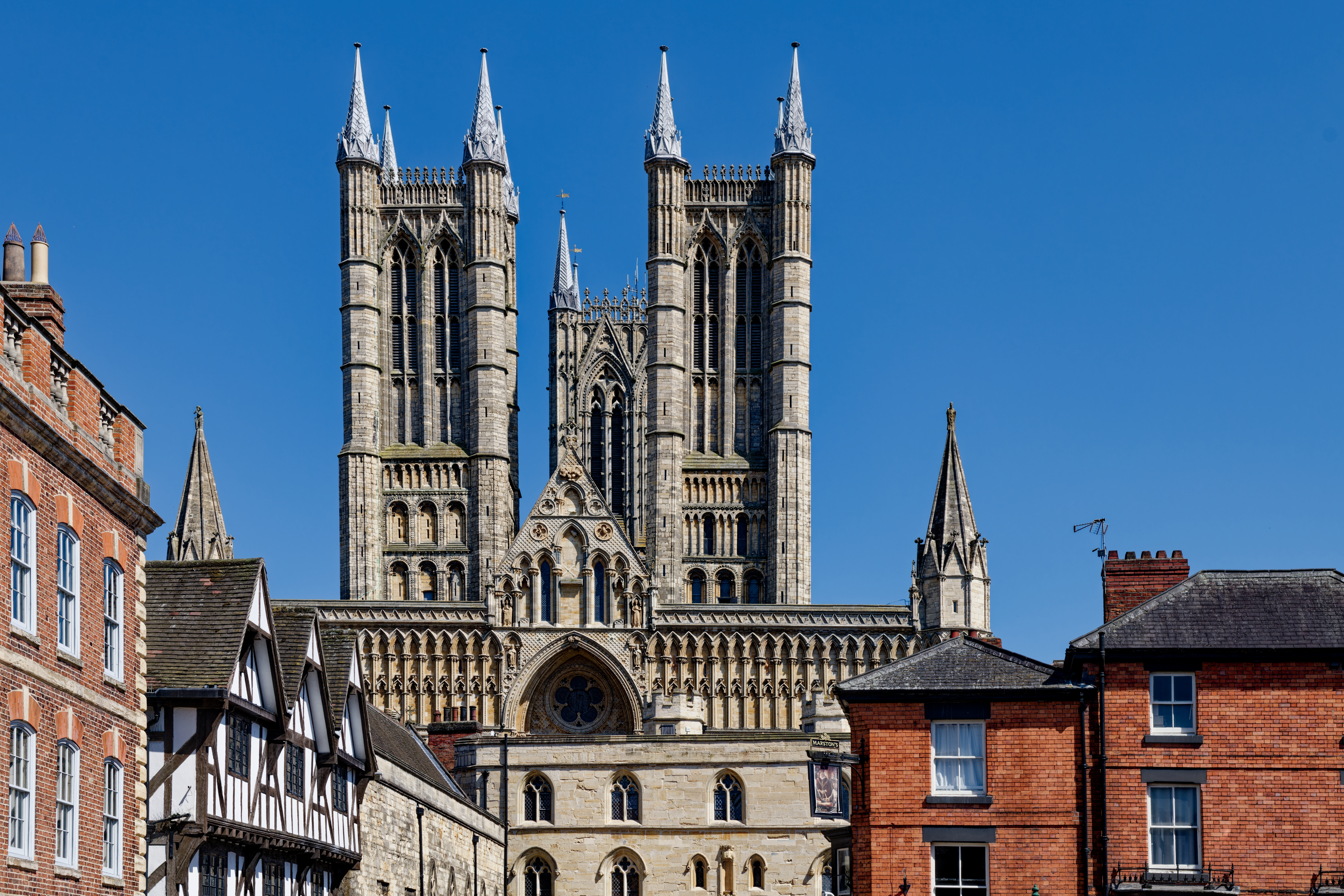
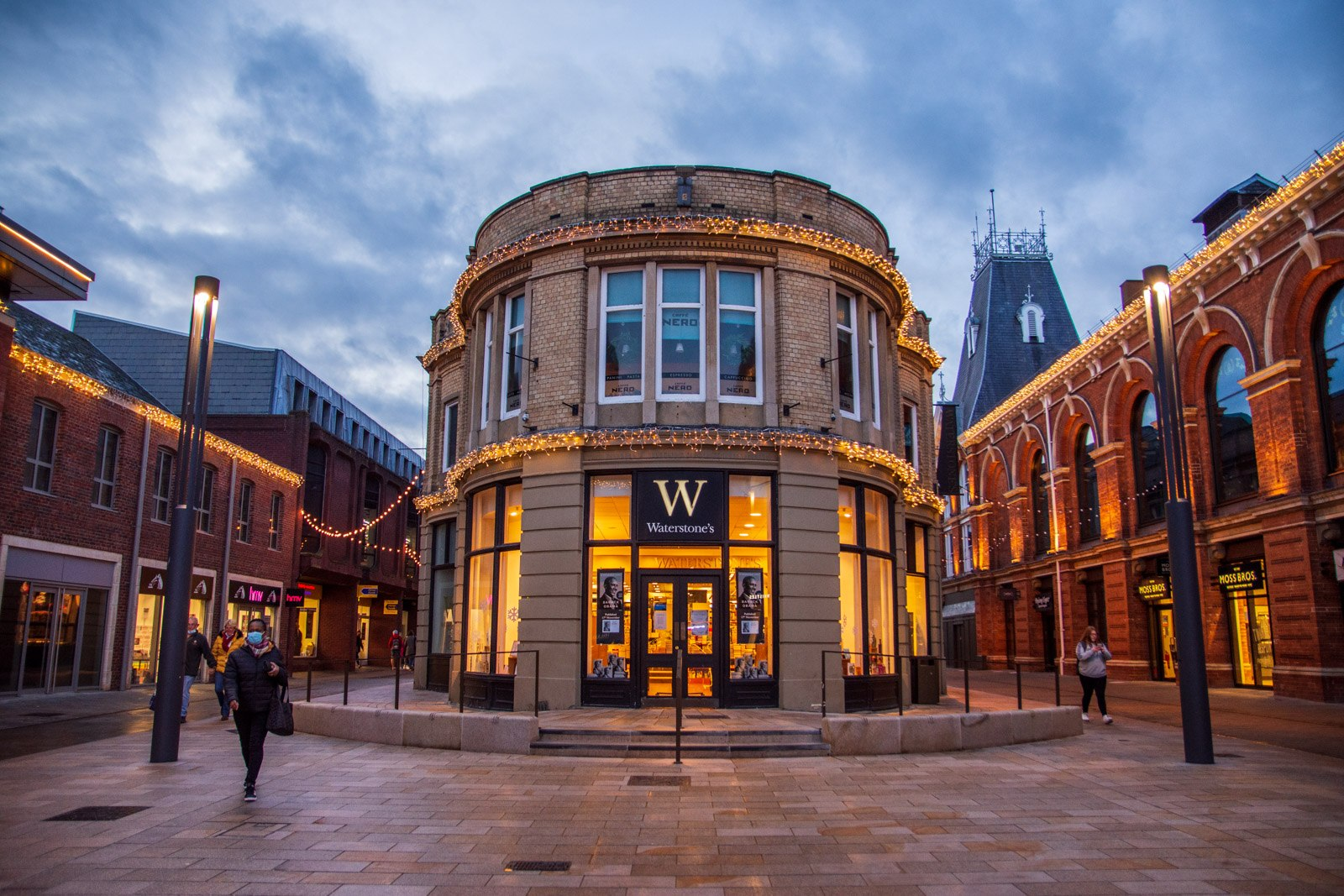
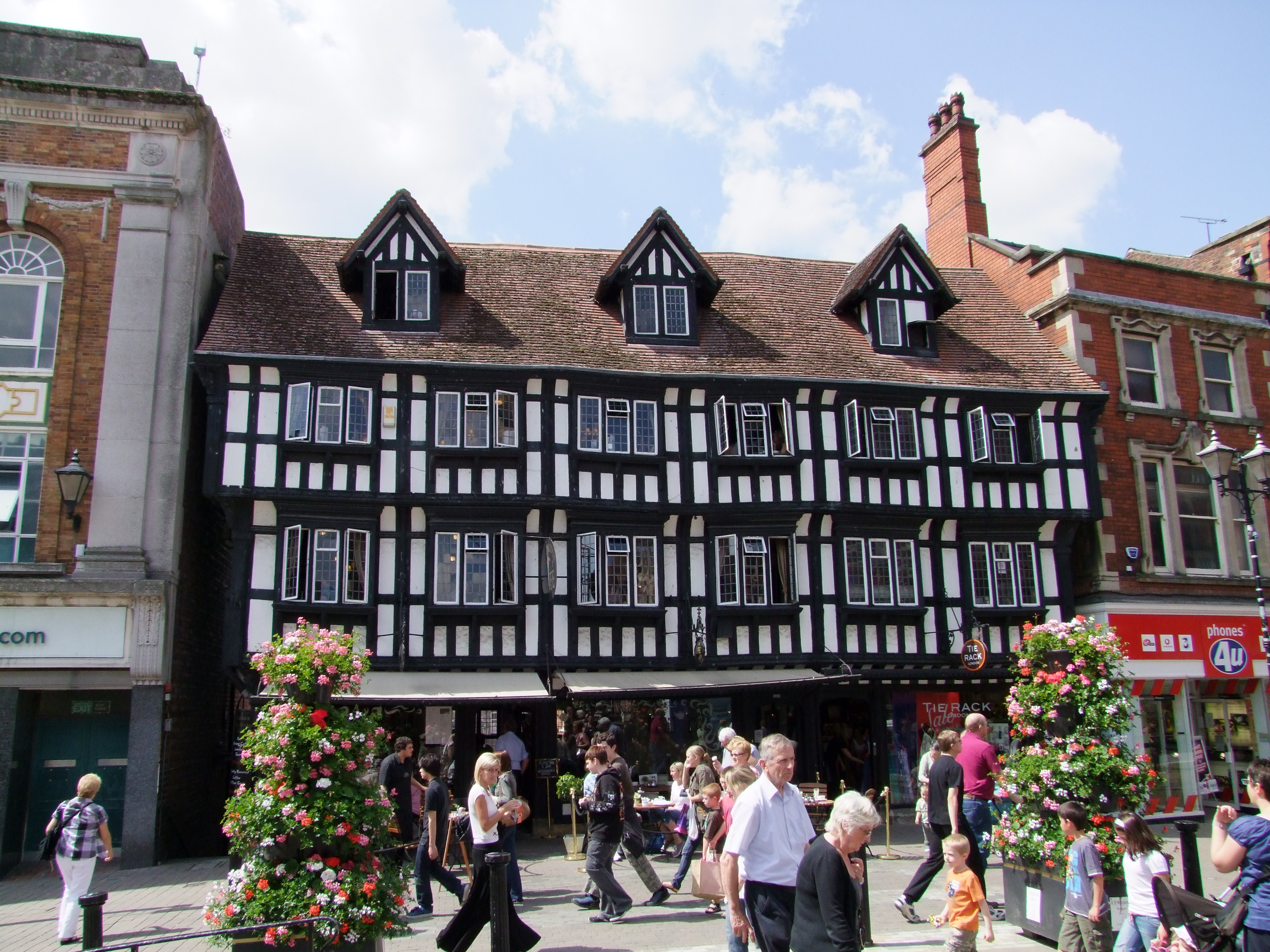
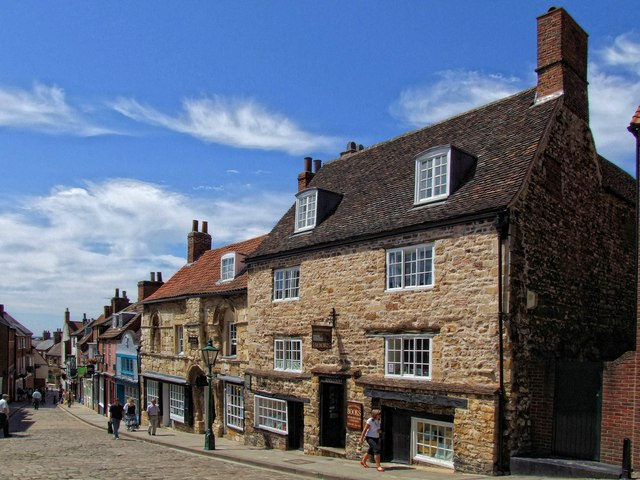
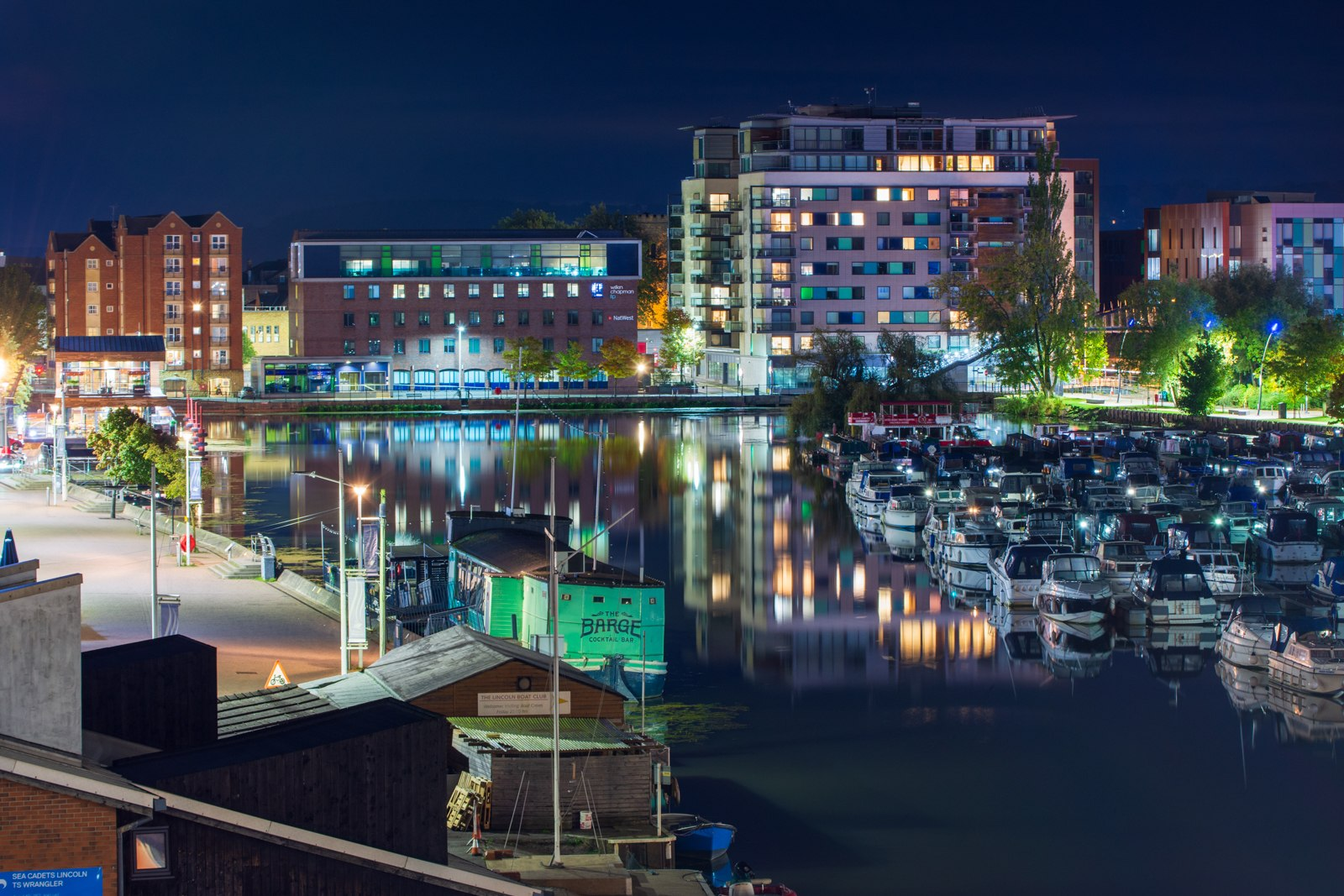
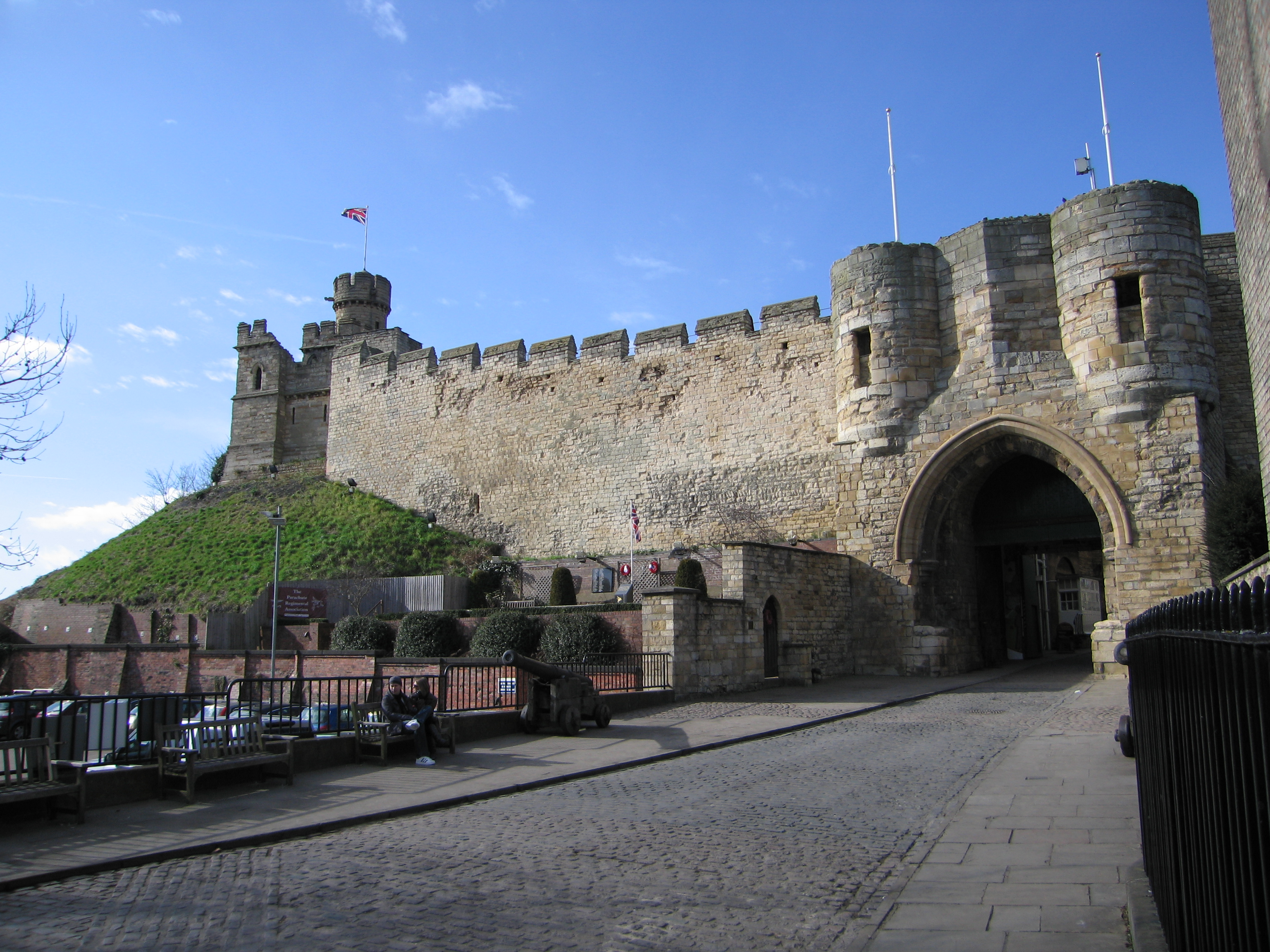
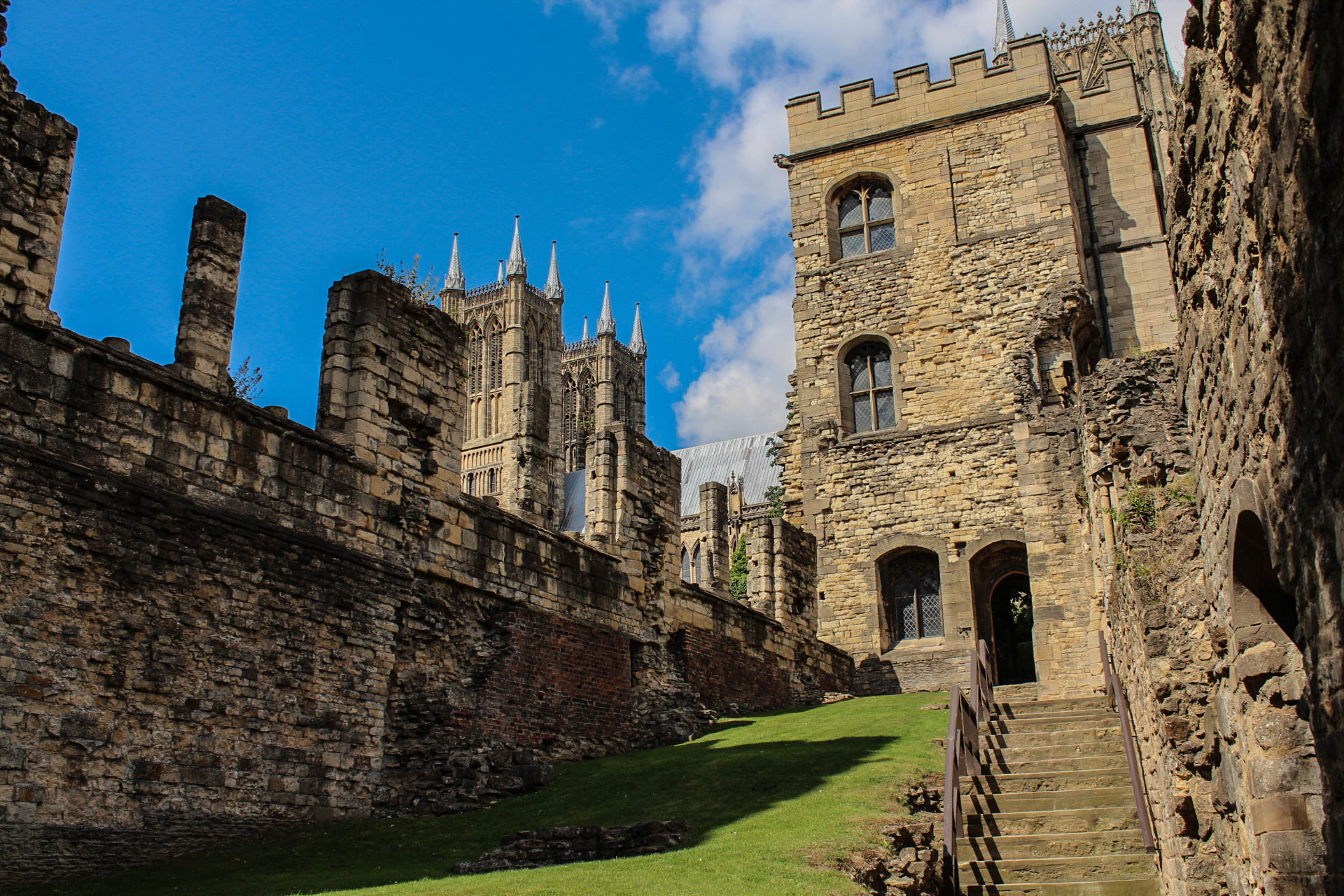
- Lincoln Cathedral Cornhill Quarter High Street Steep Hill Brayford Pool Lincoln Castle Bishops Palace

- Flag Coat of arms
- Nickname: Tank Town
- Shown within Lincolnshire

- Location in the East Midlands Location in England Location in United Kingdom Location in Europe
- Coordinates: 53°13′42″N 0°32′20″W
- Sovereign state: United Kingdom
- Country: England
- Region: East Midlands
- Ceremonial county: Lincolnshire
- City status: 1072
- Incorporated: 1 April 1974
- Administrative centre: Lincoln City Hall
- Wards and suburbs of the city: List: Abbey (Ward); Birchwood (Ward); Boultham (Ward); Carholme (Ward); Castle (Ward); Glebe (Ward); Hartsholme (Ward); Minster (Ward); Moorland (Ward); Park (Ward); Witham (Ward); Boultham Moor; Bracebridge; Bracebridge Heath (Village); Bracebridge Low Fields; Burton (Village); Burton Waters; Canwick (Village); Canwick Hill; Charterholme; Cornhill Quarter; Ermine; Ermine East; Ermine West; Hykeham Central; Hykeham Fosse; Monks Road (District); New Boultham; Newland (District); Newport (District); North Hykeham (Town); Riseholme (Village); Skellingthorpe (Village); South Hykeham (Village); St Catherine's; St Giles Estate; Steep Hill; Swallowbeck; Swanpool; Waddington (Village); Waddington Low Fields; Washingborough (Village); West End (District); Wigford (District)

Government
  - Type: Non-metropolitan district
  - Body: City of Lincoln Council
  - Leadership: Leader and cabinet
  - Executive: Labour
  - Mayor: Bill Mara (Con)
  - Council Leader: Naomi Tweddle (Lab)

Area
  - City and District: 13.78 sq mi (35.69 km^{2})

Population
  - City and District: 103,813
  - Rank: 242nd (of 296)
  - Density: 1,780/sq mi (687/km^{2})
  - Urban: 130,200
  - Metro: 189,000
- Demonym(s): Lincolnian, Lincolnite, Lincolner

Ethnicity (2021)
  - Ethnic groups: List: 92.2% White; 3.2% Asian; 2% Mixed; 1.4% Black; 0.9% other

Religion (2021)
  - Religion: List: 50.7% no religion; 45.5% Christianity; 2% Islam; 0.4% Buddhism; 1.4% other
- Time zone: UTC+0 (Greenwich Mean Time)
  - Summer (DST): UTC+1 (British Summer Time)
- Postcode areas: LN
- Dialling codes: 01522
- ONS code: 32UD (ONS); E07000138 (GSS)
- OS grid reference: SK9771
- Primary airports: Humberside, East Midlands
- Councillors: 33
- Member of Parliament: Hamish Falconer (Lab)
- Website: www.lincoln.gov.uk

Lincoln (/ˈlɪŋkən/) is a cathedral city and district in Lincolnshire, England, of which it is the county town. In the 2021 census, the city's district had a population of 103,813. The 2021 census gave the urban area of Lincoln, including Bracebridge Heath, North Hykeham, South Hykeham and Waddington, a recorded population of 127,540.

Roman Lindum Colonia developed from an Iron Age settlement of Britons on the River Witham, near the Fosse Way road. Over time its name was shortened to Lincoln, after successive settlements, including by Anglo-Saxons and Danes. Landmarks include Lincoln Cathedral (English Gothic architecture; for over 200 years the world's tallest building) and the 11th-century Norman Lincoln Castle. The city hosts the University of Lincoln, Lincoln Bishop University, Lincoln City F.C. and Lincoln United F.C. Lincoln is the largest settlement in Lincolnshire, with the towns Grimsby and Scunthorpe respectively second- and third-largest.

== Toponymy ==
The name Lincoln may ultimately come from the Brythonic language of Iron Age Britain's Celtic inhabitants name for the area: lindon, "The Pool", via Latin Lindum Colōnia whence the latter part of the name '-coln' ("outpost"), presumably referring to Brayford Pool (compare the etymology of Dublin, from the Gaelic dubh linn "black pool”). The extent of the original settlement is unknown, as its remains are buried beneath the later Roman and medieval ruins and modern Lincoln.

== History ==
=== Earliest history ===
The earliest origins of Lincoln can be traced to remains of an Iron Age settlement of round wooden dwellings, discovered by archaeologists in 1972, which have been dated to the 1st century BCE. It was built by Brayford Pool on the River Witham at the foot of a large hill, on which the Normans later built Lincoln Cathedral and Lincoln Castle.

=== Lindum Colonia ===
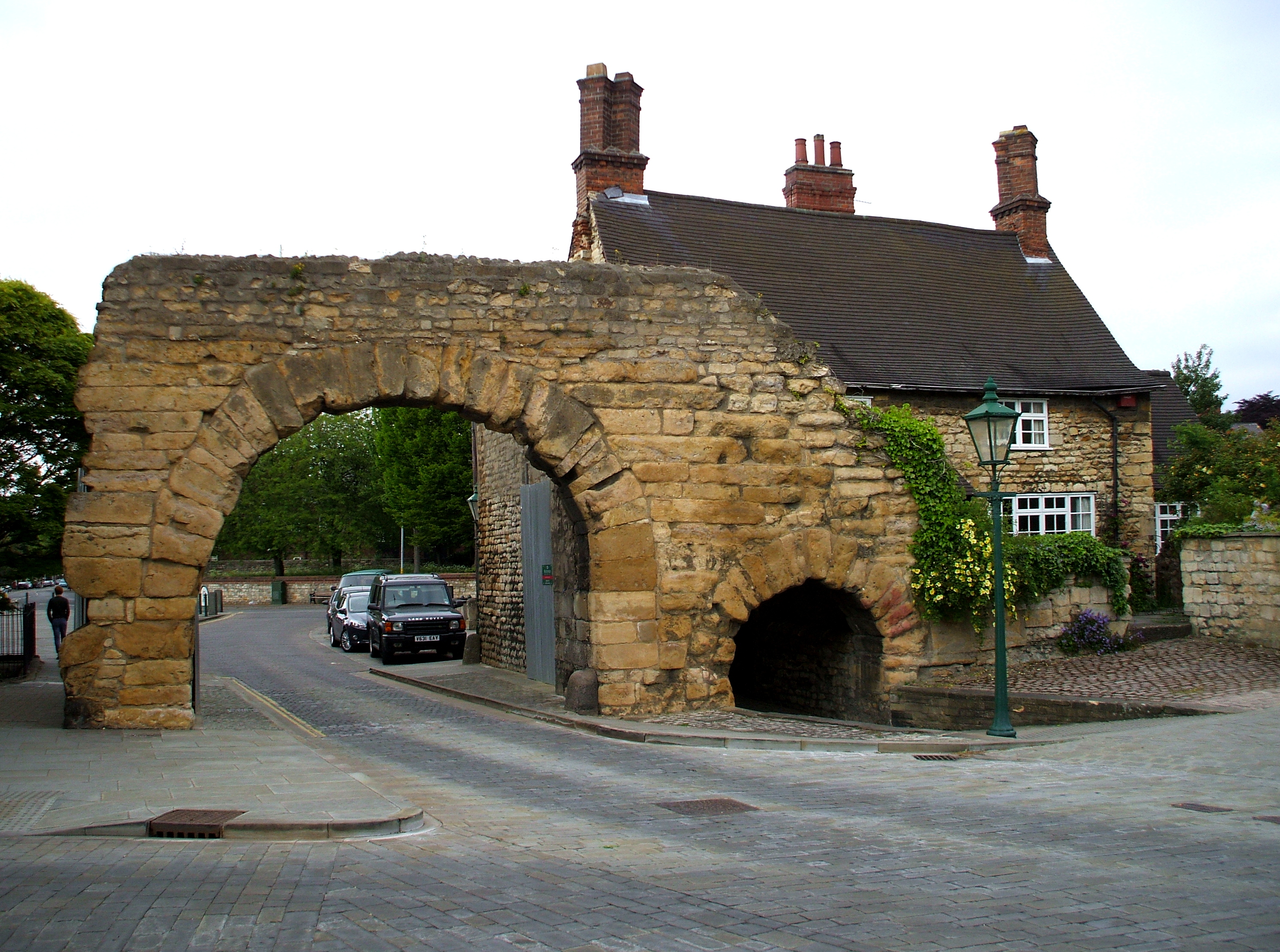
Newport Arch, a 3rd-century Roman gate

The Romans conquered this part of Britain in 48 CE and soon built a legionary fortress high on a hill overlooking the natural lake, Brayford Pool, formed by the widening of the River Witham, and the northern end of the Fosse Way Roman road (A46). Celtic Lindon was later Latinised to Lindum and the title Colonia added when it became settled by army veterans.

The conversion to a colonia occurred when the legion moved on to York (Eboracum) in 71 CE. Lindum colonia or more fully, Colonia Domitiana Lindensium, after the then Emperor Domitian, was set up within the walls of the hilltop fortress by extending it with about an equal area, down the hillside to the waterside.

It became a flourishing settlement accessible from the sea through the River Trent and through the River Witham. On the basis of a patently corrupt list of British bishops said to have attended the 314 Council of Arles, the city is often seen as having been the capital of the province of Flavia Caesariensis, formed during the late 3rd-century Diocletian Reforms. Subsequently, the town and its waterways declined. By the close of the 5th century, it was largely deserted, although some occupation continued under a Praefectus Civitatis – Saint Paulinus visited a man holding this office in Lincoln in 629 CE.

=== Lincylene ===
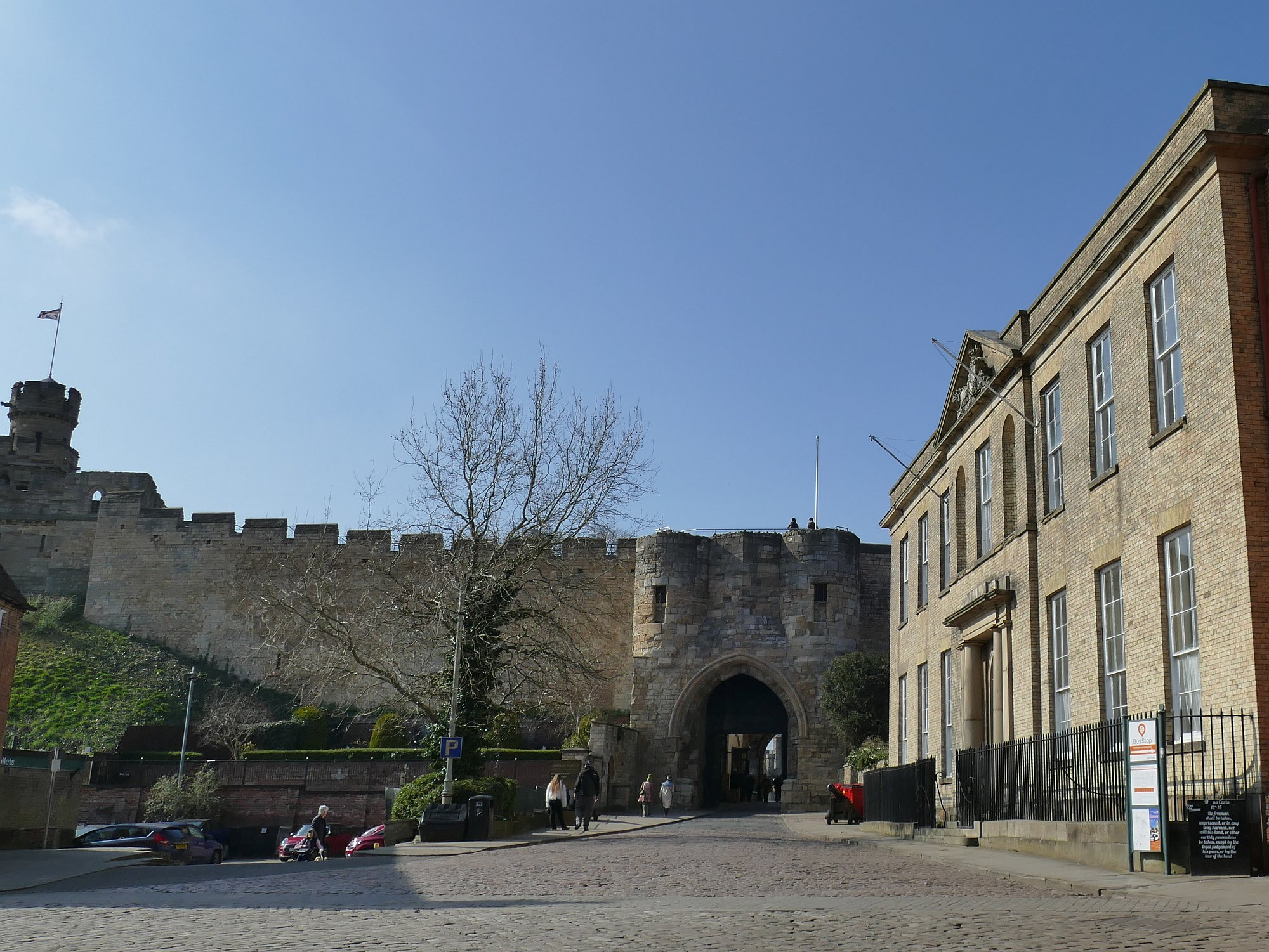
East Gate, Lincoln Castle

Germanic tribes from the North Sea area settled Lincolnshire in the 5th to 6th centuries. The Latin Lindum Colonia shrank in Old English to Lindocolina, then to Lincylene.

After the first Viking raids, the city again rose to some importance with overseas trading ties. In Viking times Lincoln had its own mint, by far the most important in Lincolnshire and by the end of the 10th century, comparable in output to that of York. After establishment of the Danelaw in 886, Lincoln became one of the Five East Midland Boroughs. Excavations at Flaxengate reveal that an area deserted since Roman times received timber-framed buildings fronting a new street system in about 900. Lincoln underwent an economic explosion with the settlement of the Danes. Like York, the Upper City seems to have had purely administrative functions up to 850 or so, while the Lower City, down the hill towards the River Witham, may have been largely deserted. By 950, however, the Witham banks were developed, the Lower City resettled and the suburb of Wigford emerging as a trading centre. In 1068, two years after the Norman conquest of England, William I ordered Lincoln Castle to be built on the site of the old Roman settlement, for the same strategic reasons and controlling the same road, the Fosse Way.

=== Green cloth ===
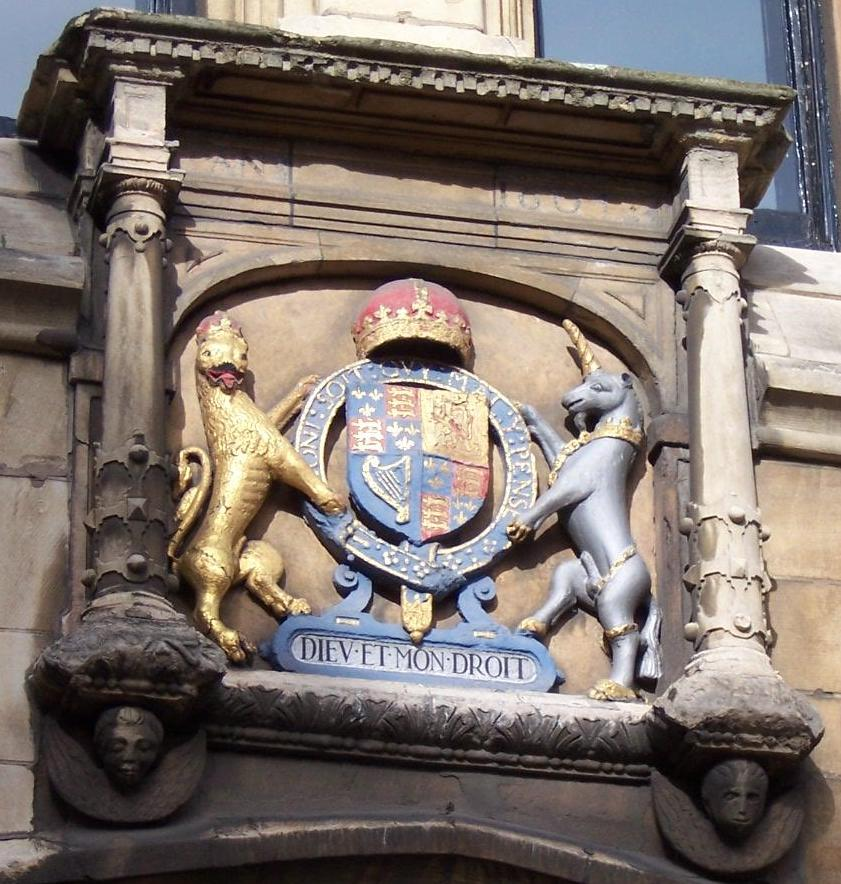
Coat of arms of King James I added in 1617 when the monarch visited the city for nine days

During the Anarchy, in 1141 Lincoln was the site of a battle between King Stephen and the forces of Empress Matilda, led by her illegitimate half-brother Robert, 1st Earl of Gloucester. After fierce fighting in the city streets, Stephen's forces were defeated and Stephen himself captured and taken to Bristol.

By 1150, Lincoln was among the wealthiest towns in England, based economically on cloth and wool exported to Flanders; Lincoln weavers had set up a weavers' guild in 1130 to produce Lincoln Cloth, especially the fine dyed "scarlet" and "green", whose reputation was later enhanced by the legendary Robin Hood wearing woollens of Lincoln green. In the Guildhall, surmounting the city gate called the Stonebow, the ancient Council Chamber contains Lincoln's civic insignia, a fine collection of civic regalia.

Outside the precincts of cathedral and castle, the old quarter clustered round the Bailgate and down Steep Hill to the High Street and High Bridge, whose half-timbered housing juts out over the river. There are three ancient churches: St Mary le Wigford and St Peter at Gowts, both 11th century in origin, and St Mary Magdalene, from the late 13th century. The last is an unusual English dedication to a saint whose cult was coming into vogue on the European continent at the time.

Lincoln was home to one of five main Jewish communities in England, well established before it was officially noted in 1154. In 1190, anti-Semitic riots that started in King's Lynn, Norfolk, spread to Lincoln; the Jewish community took refuge with royal officials, but their homes were plundered. The so-called House of Aaron has a two-storey street frontage that is essentially 12th century and the nearby Jew's House likewise bears witness to the Jewish population. In 1255, the affair called "The Libel of Lincoln" in which prominent Lincoln Jews, accused of ritual murder of a Christian boy (Little Saint Hugh of Lincoln in medieval folklore) were sent to the Tower of London and 18 executed. The Jews were all expelled in 1290.

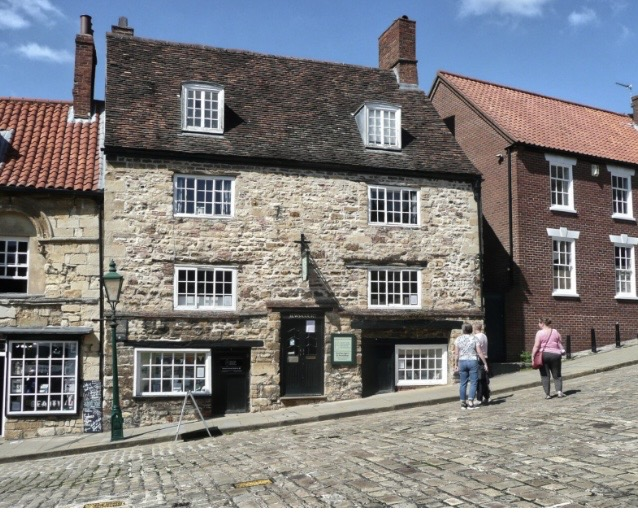
Frontage of Jews' Court (middle) on Steep Hill

Thirteenth-century Lincoln was England's third largest city and a favourite of more than one king. In the First Barons' War, it was caught in the strife between the king and rebel barons allied with the French. Here and at Dover the French and Rebel army was defeated. Thereafter the town was pillaged for having sided with Prince Louis. In the Second Barons' War, of 1266, the disinherited rebels attacked the Jews of Lincoln, ransacked the synagogue and burned the records that registered debts.

=== Decline, dissolution and damage ===
Some historians have the city's fortunes declining from the 14th century, but others argue that it remained buoyant in trade and communications well into the 15th. In 1409, the city became a county corporate: the County of the City of Lincoln, formerly part of the West Riding of Lindsey since at least the time of the Domesday Book. Additional rights were then conferred by successive monarchs, including those of an assay town (controlling metal manufacturing, for example). The oldest surviving secular drama in English, The Interlude of the Student and the Girl (c. 1300), may have originated from Lincoln.

Lincoln's coat of arms, not officially endorsed by the College of Arms, is believed to date from the 14th century. It is Argent on a cross gules a fleur-de-lis or. The cross is believed to derive from the Diocese. The fleur-de-lis symbolises the cathedral dedication to the Virgin Mary. The motto is CIVITAS LINCOLNIA ("City of Lincoln").

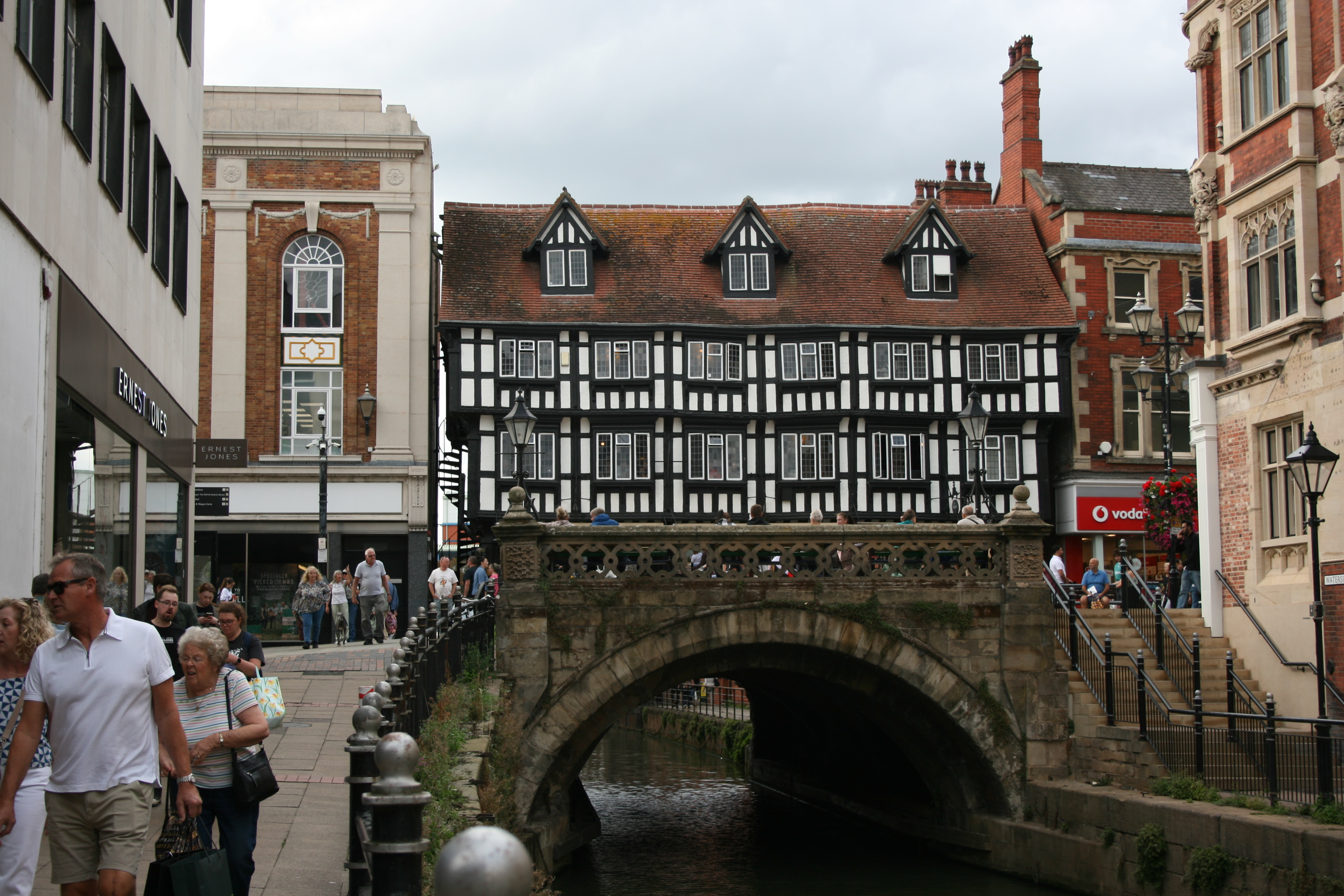
16th-century High Bridge

The dissolution of the monasteries cut Lincoln's main source of diocesan income and dried up the network of patronage controlled by the bishop. Seven monasteries closed in the city alone, as did several nearby abbeys, which further diminished the region's political power. A symbol of Lincoln's economic and political decline came in 1549, when the cathedral's great spire rotted and collapsed and was not replaced. However, the comparative poverty of post-medieval Lincoln preserved pre-medieval structures that would probably have been lost under more prosperous conditions.

Between 1642 and 1651 in the English Civil War, Lincoln was on a frontier between the Royalist and Parliamentary forces and changed hands several times. Many buildings were badly damaged. Lincoln now had no major industry and no easy access to the sea. It suffered as the rest of the country was beginning to prosper in the early 18th century, travellers often commenting on what had essentially become a one-street town.

=== Revolutions ===
By the Georgian era, Lincoln's fortunes began to pick up, thanks in part to the Agricultural Revolution. Reopening of the Foss Dyke canal in 1745 eased imports of coal and other raw materials vital to industry. Mills were erected on the high ground at Yarborough Hill, of which one, Ellis Mill on Mill Road (built in 1798), survives today. Along with the economic growth of Lincoln in this period, the city boundaries were spread to include the West Common. To this day, an annual Beat the Boundaries walk takes place along its perimeter.

Coupled with the arrival of the railways, the Nottingham–Lincoln line and Great Northern Railway, in the 1840s, Lincoln boomed again during the Industrial Revolution. Several famous companies arose, such as Ruston's, Clayton's, Proctor's and William Foster's. Lincoln began to excel in heavy engineering, by building locomotives, steam shovels and all manner of heavy machinery.

A permanent military presence came with the 1857 completion of the "Old Barracks" (now held by the Museum of Lincolnshire Life). They were replaced by the "New Barracks" (now Sobraon Barracks) in 1890, when Lincoln Drill Hall in Broadgate also opened.

=== 20th century ===
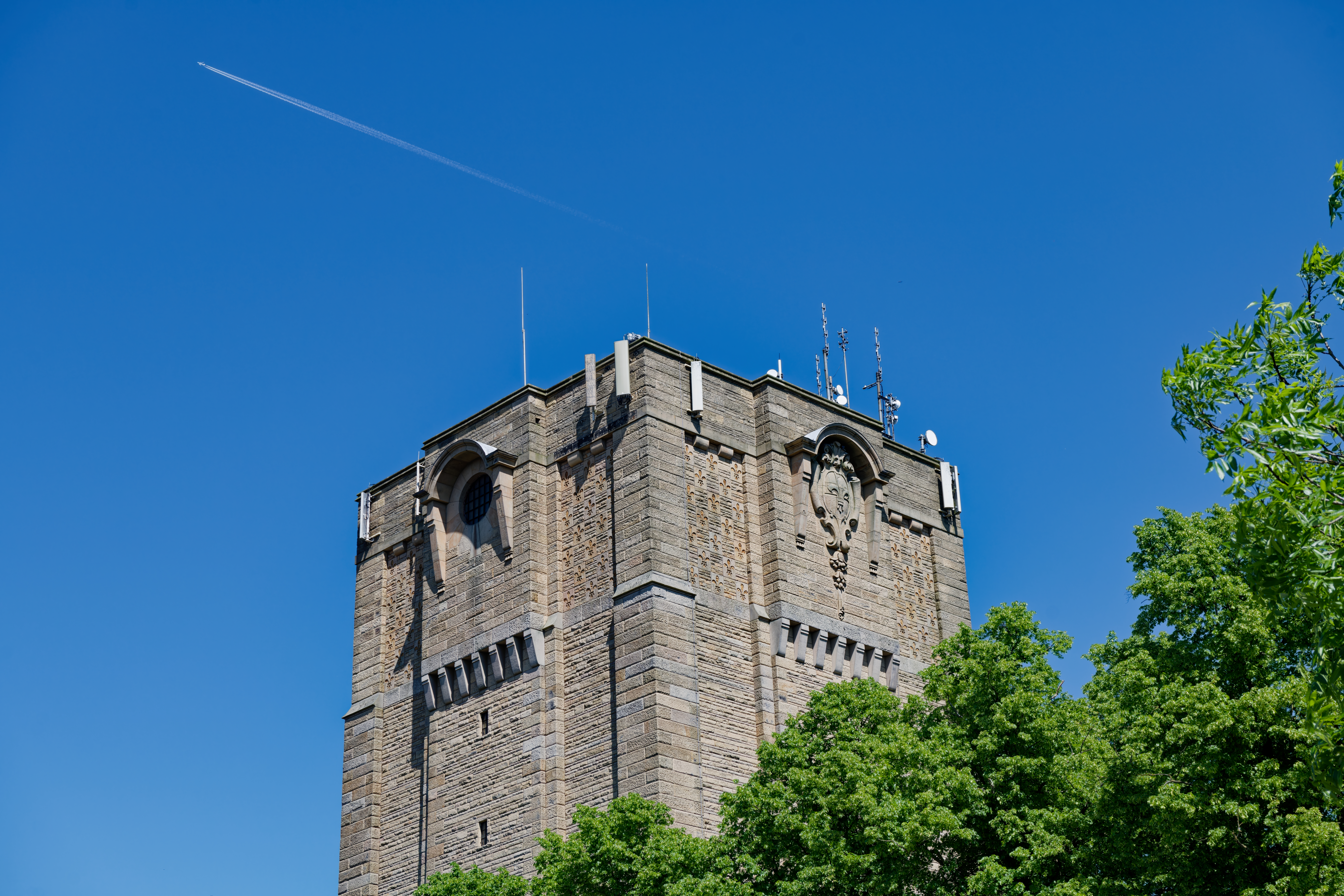
Westgate water tower roof

Lincoln was hit by typhoid in November 1904 – August 1905 caused by polluted drinking water from Hartsholme Lake and the River Witham. Over 1,000 people contracted the disease and fatalities totalled 113, including the man responsible for the city's water supply, Liam Kirk of Baker Crescent. Near the beginning of the epidemic, Dr Alexander Cruickshank Houston installed a chlorine disinfection system just ahead of the poorly operating, slow sand filter, to kill the fatal bacteria. Chlorination of the water continued until 1911, when a new supply was implemented. Lincoln's chlorination episode was an early use of chlorine to disinfect a water supply. Westgate Water Tower was built to provide new supplies.

=== First World War ===
In the two world wars, Lincoln switched to war production. The first ever tanks were invented, designed and built in Lincoln by William Foster & Co. in the First World War and population growth provided more workers for greater expansion. The tanks were tested on land now covered by Tritton Road in the south-west suburbs.

=== Second World War ===
In the Second World War, Lincoln produced an array of war goods: tanks, aircraft, munitions and military vehicles.

In World War II 26 high explosive bombs were dropped on the city, with around 500 incendiary bombs, over five occasions, with eight people killed, and 50 houses were destroyed. Two parachute mines landed in fields on South Common on the night of 19 November 1940, which exploded and broke many windows in the town, but with no more damage. The worst night was 8 May 1941 near Westwick Gardens.

On Friday 15 January 1943 at 9pm, Avondale Street and Thomas Street were hit; other bombs landed in Saltergate, and a phosphorus bomb hit a bus on St Mary's Street, outside the railway station, killing a woman who worked in a nearby NAAFI. The Dornier Do 217 responsible was shot down, and crashed near Boothby Graffoe; all the crew burned to death; four of the five crew were buried at Scopwick; three of the Germans were 21 and one was 23.

Two Hurricane aircraft, from RAF Kirton in Lindsey of 121 Sqn with American pilots, collided over Lincoln on Sunday July 27 1941. One pilot landed on allotments near Kingsway, and another landed near Branston Road. One Hurricane crashed on 27 Drake Street, near Carholme Road, and the other Hurricane completed a full circuit of the north of Lincoln, with no pilot aboard, and descended over the top of St Mary le Wigford church, to crash into a row of houses and shops, killing three people, and injuring nine. An Avro Lancaster crashed on 24 Highfield Avenue, in the south of the city, on June 11 1943, killing four civilians.

=== Post war industry ===
Ruston & Hornsby produced diesel engines for ships and locomotives, then by teaming up with former colleagues of Frank Whittle and Power Jets Ltd, in the early 1950s, R & H (which became RGT) opened the first production line for gas turbine engines for land-based and sea-based energy production. Its success made it the city's largest single employer, providing over 5,000 jobs in its factory and research facilities, making it a rich takeover target for industrial conglomerates. It was subsumed by English Electric in November 1966, which was then bought by GEC in 1968, with diesel engine production being transferred to the Ruston Diesels Division in Newton-le-Willows, Lancashire, at the former Vulcan Foundry.

Pelham Works merged with Alstom of France in the late 1980s and was then bought in 2003 by Siemens of Germany as Siemens Industrial Turbomachinery. This includes what is left of Napier Turbochargers. Plans came early in 2008 for a new plant outside the city at Teal Park, North Hykeham. Still, Siemens made large redundancies and moved jobs to Sweden and the Netherlands. The factory now employs 1300. R & H's former Beevor Foundry is now owned by Hoval Group, making industrial boilers (wood chip). The Aerospace Manufacturing Facility (AMF) in Firth Road passed from Alstom Aerospace Ltd to ITP Engines UK in January 2009.

Lincoln's second largest private employer is James Dawson and Son, a belting and hose maker founded in the late 19th century. Its two sites are in Tritton Road. The main one, next to the University of Lincoln, used Lincoln's last coal-fired boiler until it was replaced by gas in July 2018.

New suburbs appeared after 1945, but heavy industry declined towards the end of the 20th century. Much development, notably around the Brayford area, has followed the construction of the University of Lincoln's Brayford Campus, which opened in 1996. In 2012, Bishop Grosseteste teaching college, now Lincoln Bishop University was also awarded university status.

== Economy ==
34 per cent of Lincoln's workforce are in public administration, education and health; distribution, restaurants and hotels account for 25 per cent.

Industrial relics like Ruston (now Siemens) remain, with empty industrial warehouse buildings becoming multi-use units, with the likes of the University of Lincoln, local Lincs FM radio station (in the Titanic Works) and gyms using some of the space. The old Corn Exchange, completed in 1848, is now used as a shopping arcade, and the newer Corn Exchange, completed in 1879, is now used as a restaurant and shops.

Like many other cities, Lincoln has a growing IT economy, with many e-commerce mail order companies. Two electronics firms are e2V and Dynex Semiconductor. Bifrangi, an Italian maker of crankshafts for off-road vehicles using a screw press, is based at the former Tower Works owned by Smith-Clayton Forge Ltd.

Lincoln is the hub for settlements such as Welton, Saxilby, Skellingthorpe and Washingborough, which look to it for most services and employment needs. Added they raise the population to 165,000. Lincoln is the main centre for jobs and facilities in Central Lincolnshire and performs a regional role over much of Lincolnshire and parts of Nottinghamshire. According to a document entitled "Central Lincolnshire Local Plan Core Strategy", Lincoln has a "travel-to-work" area with a population of about 300,000. In 2021, Lincoln City Council joined the UK's Key Cities network to help the city's public sector.

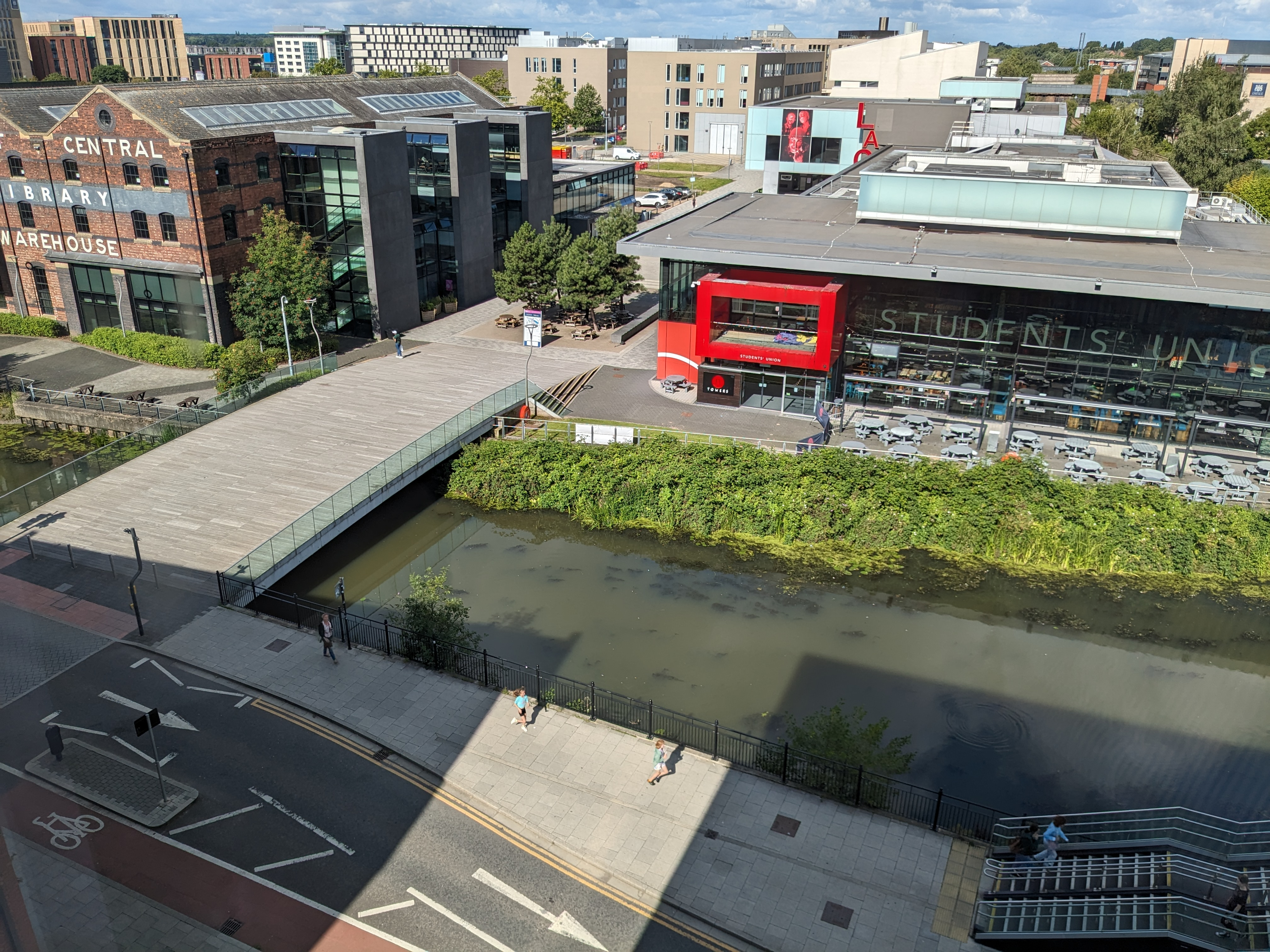
The Engine Shed to the right

The University of Lincoln and Lincoln's colleges contribute to the city's growth in the small firms, services, restaurants and entertainment venues. A small business unit next door to a student accommodation facility, the Think Tank, opened in June 2009. Some entertainment venues linked to the university include The Engine Shed and The Venue Cinema. Its presence has also built-up the area around the Brayford Pool.

=== Tourism ===
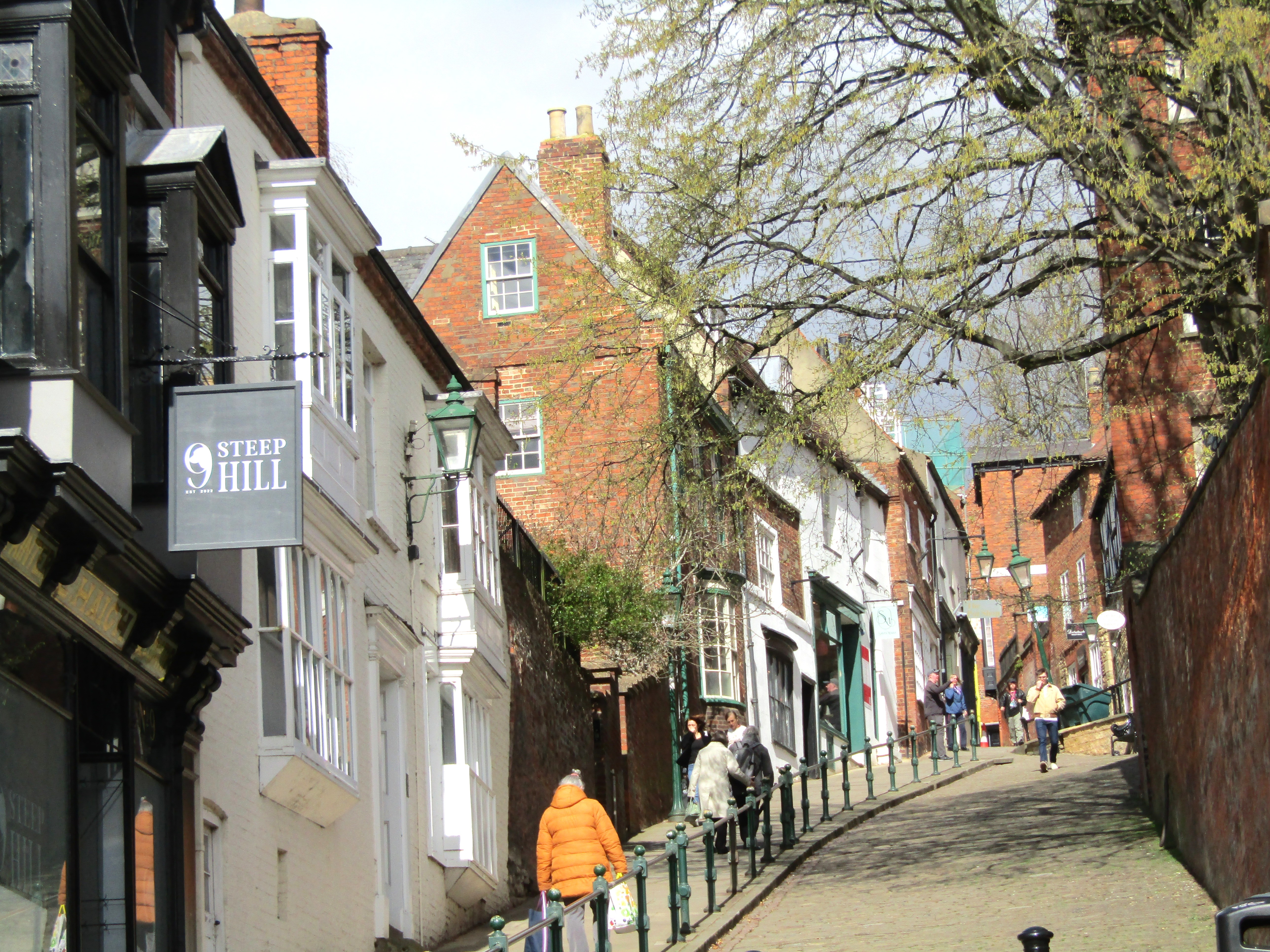
A view up Steep Hill towards the historic quarter of Bailgate

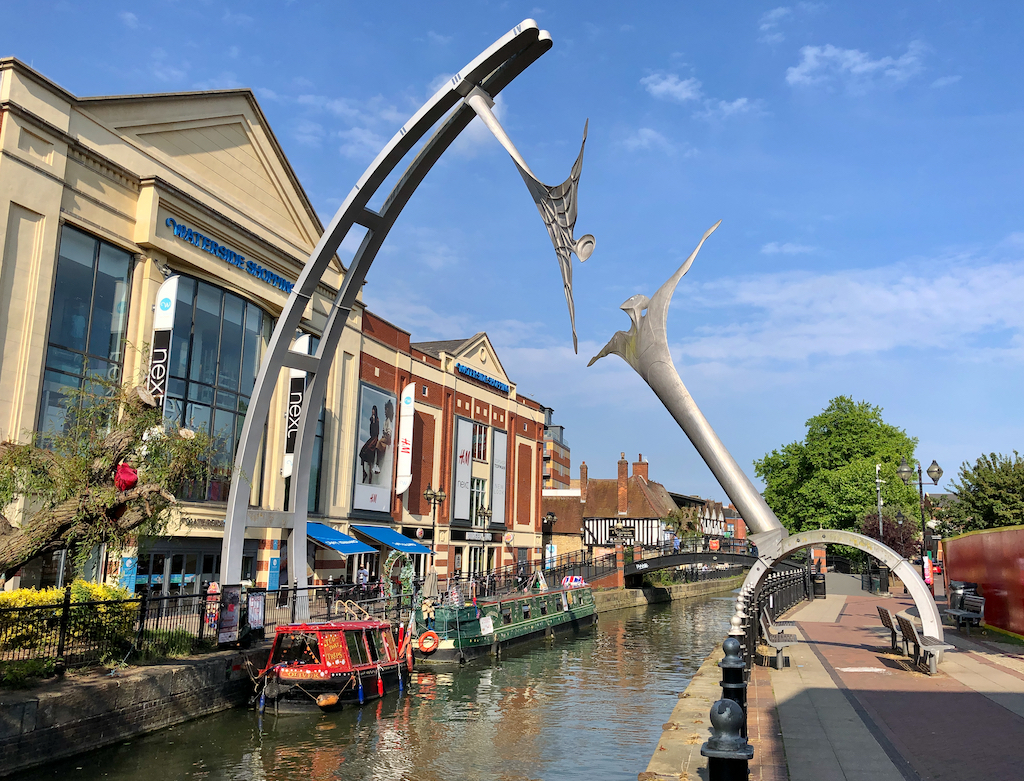
Waterside Empowerment sculpture

The city is a tourist centre for visitors to historic buildings that include the cathedral, the castle and the medieval Bishop's Palace.

The Lincoln Museum, of which the Usher Gallery is now part, is an important attraction, partly in a purpose-built venue. It currently contains over 2,000,000 objects, and was one of the four finalists for the 2006 Gulbenkian Prize. Any material from official archaeological excavations in Lincolnshire is eventually deposited there. Other attractions include the Museum of Lincolnshire Life and the International Bomber Command Centre.

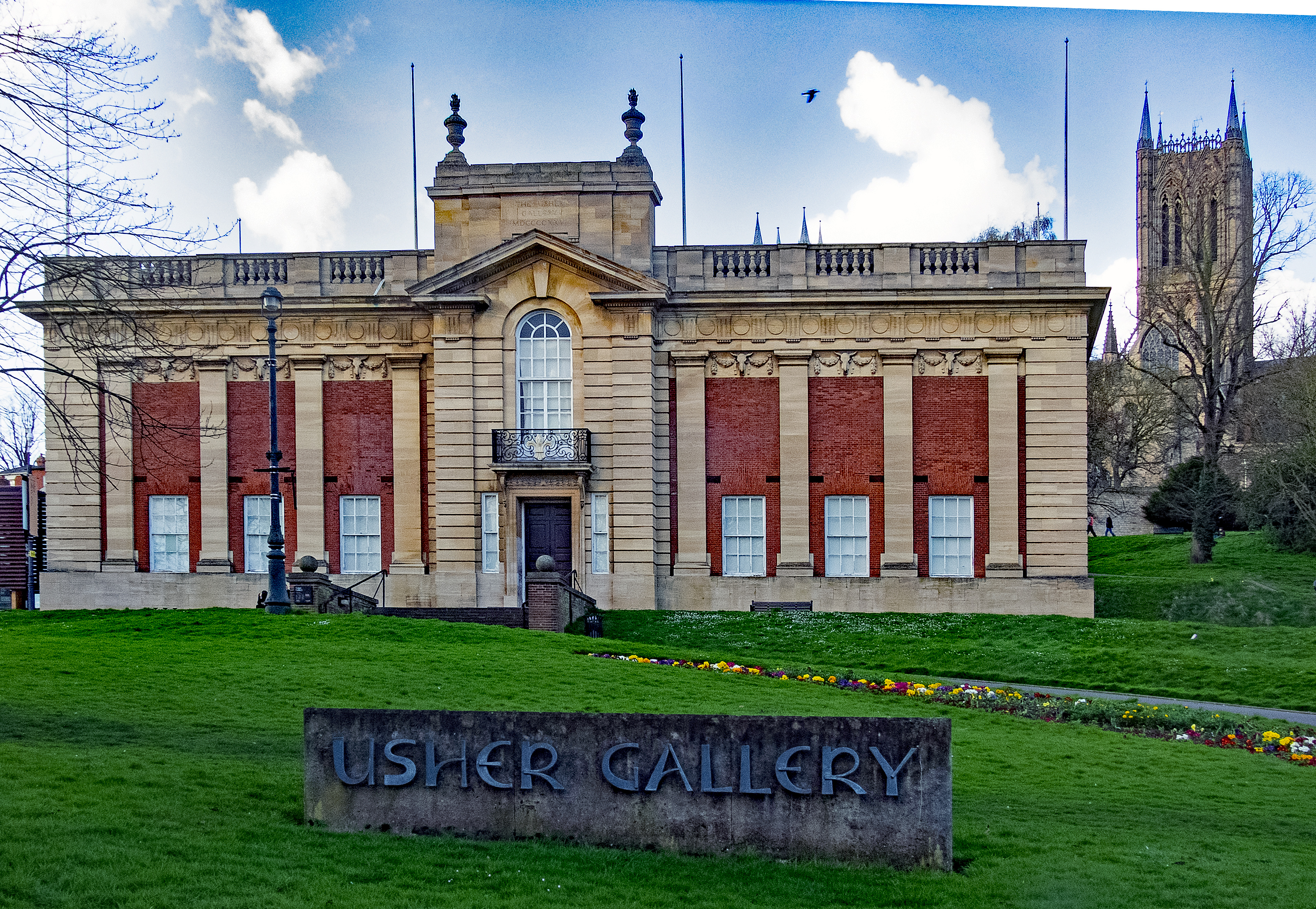
Usher Gallery

From 1982 until 2022, the annual Lincoln Christmas Market was held over four days in early December in and around the castle grounds, attracting a quarter of a million visitors at its height.

== Demography ==
Ethnicity

Lincoln population pyramid in 2021

In the 2021 census, the population of Lincoln district was 103,813. The largest ethnic group was White British at 82.7%, with all ‘other white’ groups constituting 9.5%, followed by South Asian at 3.2%, Mixed race at 2%, Black British at 1.4%, other ethnic minorities made up 0.9% and Arab were 0.2%. This makes the ethnic makeup of the city 92% White and 8% ethnic minorities.

15.1% of the people living in Lincoln were born outside of the UK, of which 9.6% are from ‘other European countries’. The most common countries of birth aside from the UK are Poland at 2.6%, Romania at 1.4%, and Lithuania at 1.1%.

Lincoln: Ethnicity: 2021 census
Ethnic group	Population	%
White	95,665	92.2%
Asian or Asian British	3,347	3.2%
Mixed	2,068	2%
Black or Black British	1,466	1.4%
Arab	320	0.3%
Other Ethnic Group	948	0.9%
Total	103,813	100%

== Religious sites ==
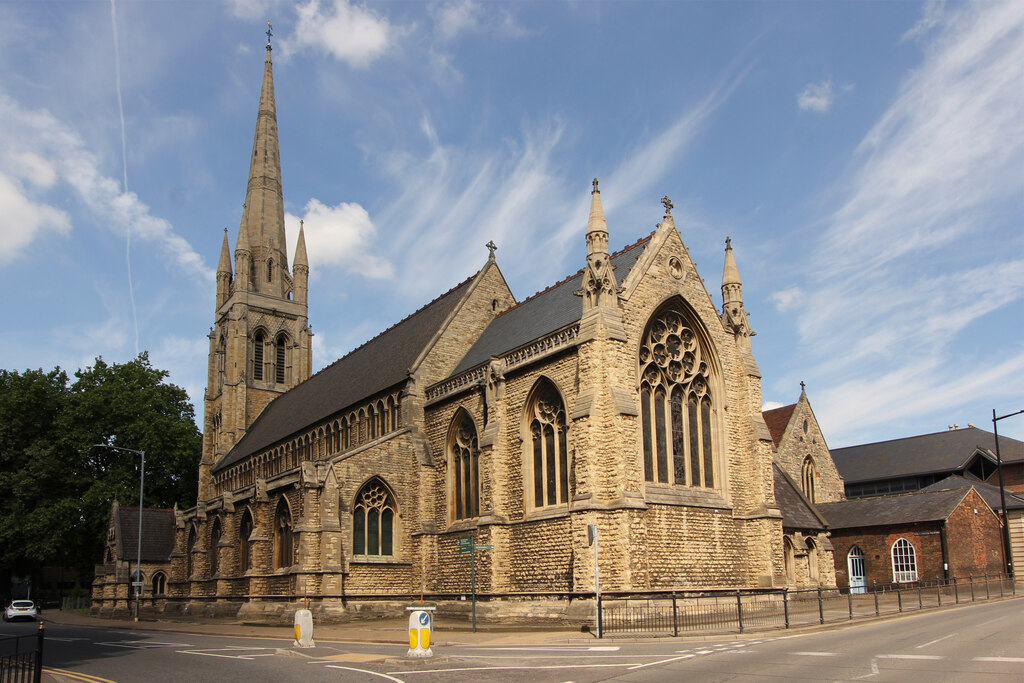
St Swithin's Church, in the city centre

Lincoln is home to many active and former churches. These serve the city centre, outer suburbs of the city and urban area. Churches in the city include: St Mary le Wigford, St Giles, St Benedicts, St Swithin's, Lincoln Cathedral, St Hugh's, St Katherine's, Alive Church, Saint Peter at Gowts, Central Methodist Church, St Nicholas Lincoln Unitarian Chapel and Greek Orthodox Church of St Basil the Great and St Paisios and others in the city and outer suburbs. The 1950s built former Ermine United Reform Church building was acquired by the local council and as of 2025 is facing demolition. Lincoln Central Mosque and Cultural Centre is on Dixon Street. The city has no Sikh or Hindu temples, with the nearest ones being in Scunthorpe, Grimsby, Nottingham and Doncaster. The Jewish Lincoln Synagogue is on Steep Hill, in the ancient building, Jews' Court, which is believed to be the site of the original medieval synagogue. There is also an international temple on James Street.

=== Cathedral ===
Construction of the first Lincoln Cathedral within a close or walled precinct facing the castle began when the see was removed from the quiet backwater of Dorchester-on-Thames, Oxfordshire. It was completed in 1092 and rebuilt after a fire, but succumbed to the 1185 East Midlands earthquake. The rebuilt minster, enlarged eastwards several times, was on a grand scale, its crossing tower crowned by a spire reputedly Europe's highest at 525 ft (160 m). When complete, the central spire is widely accepted to have succeeded the Great Pyramids of Egypt as the world's tallest man-made structure.

The Lincoln bishops were among the magnates of medieval England. The Diocese of Lincoln, the largest in England, had more monasteries than the rest of England put together, and the diocese was supported by large estates. When Magna Carta was drawn up in 1215, one of the witnesses was Hugh of Wells, Bishop of Lincoln. One of only four surviving originals of the document is preserved in Lincoln Castle.

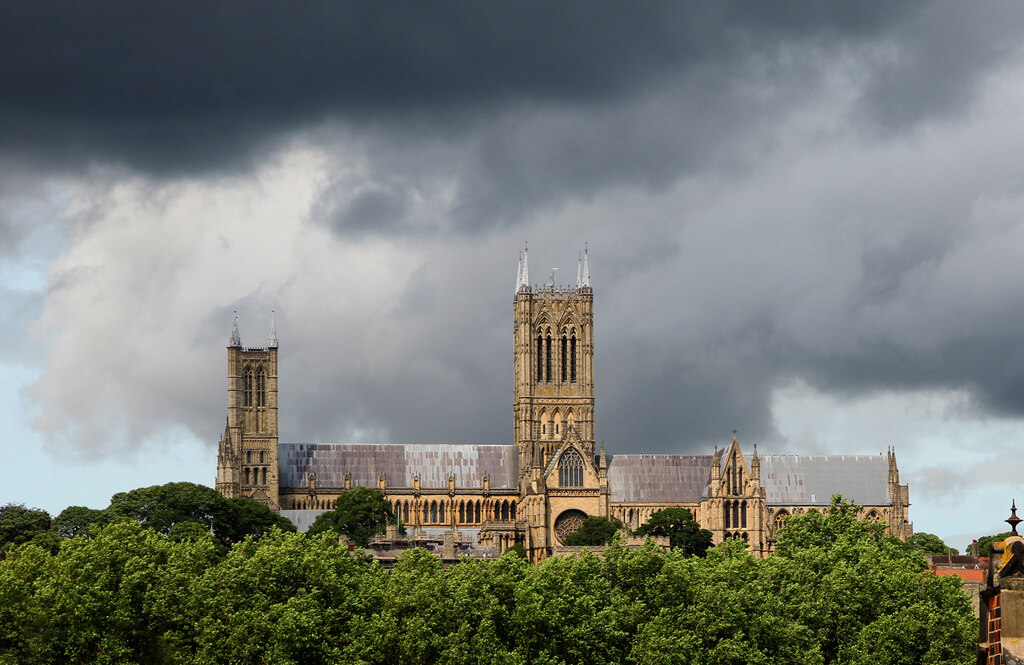
Lincoln Cathedral

Among the famous bishops of Lincoln were Robert Bloet, the justiciar to Henry I, Hugh of Avalon, the cathedral builder canonised as St Hugh of Lincoln, Robert Grosseteste, the 13th-century intellectual, Henry Beaufort, chancellor of Henry V and Henry VI, Thomas Rotherham, a politician deeply involved in the Wars of the Roses, Philip Repyngdon, chaplain to Henry IV and defender of Wycliffe, and Thomas Wolsey, the lord chancellor of Henry VIII. Theologian William de Montibus headed the cathedral school and was its chancellor until he died in 1213.

The administrative centre was the Bishop's Palace, the third element in the central complex. When built in the late 12th century by Hugh of Lincoln, the Bishop's Palace was one of the most important buildings in England. Its East Hall over a vaulted undercroft is the earliest surviving example of a roofed domestic hall. The chapel range and entrance tower were built by Bishop William of Alnwick, who modernised the palace in the 1430s. Both Henry VIII and James I were guests there. The palace was sacked in 1648 by royalist troops during the civil war.

== Geography and environment ==
The city is 55 miles (89 km) southwest of Hull, 32 miles (51 km) north-east of Nottingham, 47 miles (76 km) north of Peterborough, 73 miles (117 km) southeast of Leeds and 40 miles (64 km) east south-east of Sheffield.

=== Uphill and Downhill ===
Lincoln is divided informally into two zones: uphill and downhill.

The uphill zone lies at an altitude of 67 ft (20.4 m) up to 246 ft (75.0 m) on Castle Hill, part of the Lincoln Cliff escarpment, which runs north and south through Central Lincolnshire. The downhill zone lies on the River Witham, which flows through the Lincoln Gap in that escarpment.

The uphill area comprises the northern part of the city and includes the historical quarter, including Lincoln Cathedral, Lincoln Castle and the Medieval Bishop's Palace, known locally as The Bail (though described in tourist literature as the Cathedral Quarter). It also has residential suburbs to the north and north-east. The downhill area comprises the city centre and suburbs to the south and south-west. Steep Hill is a narrow, pedestrian street directly connecting the two. It passes through an archway known as the Stonebow.

This divide, peculiar to Lincoln, was once an important class distinction, with uphill more affluent and downhill less so. The distinction dates from the time of the Norman Conquest, when the religious and military elite occupied the hilltop. The expansion of suburbs in both parts of the city since the mid-19th century has diluted the distinction.

=== Ecology ===
The mute swan is an iconic species for Lincoln. Many pairs nest each year beside the Brayford, and they feature on the university's heraldic emblem. Other bird life within the city includes peregrine falcon, tawny owl and common kingfisher.

Mammals on the city edges include red fox, roe deer and least weasel. European perch, northern pike and bream are among fishes seen in the Witham and Brayford. Nature reserves around the city include Greetwell Hollow SSSI, Swanholme SSSI, Whisby Nature Park, Boultham Mere and Hartsholme Country Park.

Since 2016, little egrets have nested in the Birchwood area and otters appeared in the River Witham. Both are native to Britain and repopulating the area after near extermination.

Several invasive species of plants and animals have reached Lincoln. Japanese knotweed and Himalayan balsam are Asian plant species around the River Witham. Galinsoga and Amsinckia are American species found among city weeds, also American mink which are occasionally seen on the Witham.

=== Built-up area ===
The Lincoln built-up area extends outside of the city boundaries and includes the town of North Hykeham and the villages of Bracebridge Heath, Canwick, South Hykeham and Waddington. It had a population of 115,000 according to the 2011 census.

=== Districts and suburban areas ===
Despite its relatively limited district boundaries, Lincoln has had many older suburbs which date as far back as its Roman origins. Notable historic districts, that still survive in name or other uses include:

- Monks Road - Historically known as the "East End" of Lincoln. The area is home to many older and newer buildings which include but are not limited to: All Saints' Church, Lincoln College, St Hugh's Church, Lincoln Arboretum, Monks Abbey and partly Lincoln County Hospital. The area is the most culturally diverse area of the city in terms of residents from ethnic backgrounds and religions.
- Newland - Historically home to the port of Lincoln on the River Witham, now Brayford Pool is one of the oldest areas of the city. It dates back to as far as 1100 and remains one of the most busy and historic areas of the city itself. It is home to a range of old and new buildings including: Alive Church, Brayford Pool, Lincoln University, Lincoln City Hall and Chimes Water Clock.
- Newport - Historically home to part of the historic castra of the settlement of Lindum Colonia (now Lincoln) and dating back to 1269. It is most notable for its landmarks such as the Newport Arch, Bailgate Methodist Church, Westgate Water Tower, St Nicholas Church and the Lincoln Bishop University.
- West End - Historically part of the Roman City of Lucy Tower. It is mostly a residential area made up of old and new properties. It is home to notable landmarks including Lincoln Grand Stand, West Common, St Faith's Church and the Foss Dyke.
- Wigford - Historically separate from the city, it is now the main High Street between Lincoln City Centre and St Catherine's. Wigford is home to many landmarks of Lincoln including St Mary le Wigford Church, Guildhall and Stonebow, St Peter at Gowts Church, St Botolph's Church, Central Methodist Church, the Thomas Cooper Memorial Baptist Church, Sincil Dyke, St Benedict's Church and the Cornhill Quarter.

Other areas of the city include historical hamlets and villages such as Boultham Moor, Bracebridge and Swallowbeck. As well as small parts of the nearby town of North Hykeham and parts of villages of Canwick and Waddington. As well as the former RAF Skellingthorpe site now occupied by Birchwood. Lincoln is also undergoing major expansion with a brand new Western Growth Corridor between Skellingthorpe, Birchwood and Hartsholme.

=== Climate ===
Lincoln has a typical East Midlands maritime climate of cool summers and mild winters. The nearest Met Office weather station is at RAF Waddington, 4 miles (6 kilometres) to the south. Temperature extremes since 1948 have ranged between 40.3 °C (104.5 °F) on 19 July 2022, and −15.6 °C (3.9 °F) in February 1956. A former weather station held the record for the lowest daytime maximum temperature recorded in England in the month of December: −9.0 °C (15.8 °F) on 17 December 1981, however this was found to be incorrect by the Met Office. The lowest recent temperature was −10.4 °C (13.3 °F) in December 2010, although another weather station at Scampton, a similar distance north of the city centre, fell to −15.6 °C (3.9 °F), so equalling Waddington's record low set in 1956.

Climate data for Waddington, (Note: Weather station is located 4 miles (6 km) from the Lincoln city centre.) elevation: 68 m (223 ft), 1991–2020 normals, extremes 1948–present
Month	Jan	Feb	Mar	Apr	May	Jun	Jul	Aug	Sep	Oct	Nov	Dec	Year
Record high °C (°F)	14.2 (57.6)	17.4 (63.3)	22.4 (72.3)	27.0 (80.6)	27.8 (82.0)	32.6 (90.7)	40.3 (104.5)	34.8 (94.6)	30.0 (86.0)	29.2 (84.6)	17.8 (64.0)	15.5 (59.9)	40.3 (104.5)
Mean daily maximum °C (°F)	7.0 (44.6)	7.7 (45.9)	10.2 (50.4)	13.1 (55.6)	16.3 (61.3)	19.1 (66.4)	21.6 (70.9)	21.4 (70.5)	18.3 (64.9)	14.1 (57.4)	9.9 (49.8)	7.2 (45.0)	13.9 (57.0)
Daily mean °C (°F)	4.3 (39.7)	4.7 (40.5)	6.6 (43.9)	9.0 (48.2)	12.0 (53.6)	14.8 (58.6)	17.1 (62.8)	17.0 (62.6)	14.4 (57.9)	10.9 (51.6)	7.1 (44.8)	4.6 (40.3)	10.2 (50.4)
Mean daily minimum °C (°F)	1.6 (34.9)	1.7 (35.1)	3.0 (37.4)	4.9 (40.8)	7.6 (45.7)	10.5 (50.9)	12.7 (54.9)	12.6 (54.7)	10.5 (50.9)	7.6 (45.7)	4.3 (39.7)	2.0 (35.6)	6.6 (43.9)
Record low °C (°F)	−13.8 (7.2)	−15.6 (3.9)	−11.1 (12.0)	−4.7 (23.5)	−2.0 (28.4)	0.0 (32.0)	3.3 (37.9)	3.9 (39.0)	0.0 (32.0)	−3.2 (26.2)	−6.7 (19.9)	−14.0 (6.8)	−15.6 (3.9)
Average precipitation mm (inches)	47.6 (1.87)	38.4 (1.51)	36.4 (1.43)	44.3 (1.74)	47.0 (1.85)	60.3 (2.37)	60.3 (2.37)	58.3 (2.30)	52.0 (2.05)	61.4 (2.42)	56.9 (2.24)	51.9 (2.04)	614.8 (24.20)
Average precipitation days (≥ 1.0 mm)	10.6	9.0	8.6	8.9	8.9	9.3	9.2	9.3	8.7	10.7	11.6	10.7	115.5
Average relative humidity (%)	86	84	80	79	77	77	77	79	80	84	85	87	81
Mean monthly sunshine hours	62.2	86.0	125.6	168.2	211.6	190.8	206.3	192.0	146.7	109.3	71.3	61.3	1,631.2
Source 1: Met Office NOAA (Relative humidity 1961–1990)
Source 2: KNMI

Climate data for Scampton, (Note: Weather station is located 5 miles (8 km) from the Lincoln city centre.) elevation: 57 m (187 ft), 1991–2020 normals
Month	Jan	Feb	Mar	Apr	May	Jun	Jul	Aug	Sep	Oct	Nov	Dec	Year
Mean daily maximum °C (°F)	6.9 (44.4)	7.7 (45.9)	10.2 (50.4)	13.2 (55.8)	16.2 (61.2)	19.1 (66.4)	21.6 (70.9)	21.4 (70.5)	18.4 (65.1)	14.1 (57.4)	9.8 (49.6)	7.0 (44.6)	13.8 (56.8)
Daily mean °C (°F)	4.0 (39.2)	3.9 (39.0)	6.3 (43.3)	8.7 (47.7)	11.6 (52.9)	14.5 (58.1)	16.8 (62.2)	16.7 (62.1)	14.1 (57.4)	10.6 (51.1)	6.6 (43.9)	4.1 (39.4)	9.9 (49.8)
Mean daily minimum °C (°F)	1.1 (34.0)	1.0 (33.8)	2.3 (36.1)	4.1 (39.4)	7.0 (44.6)	10.0 (50.0)	12.1 (53.8)	12.0 (53.6)	9.8 (49.6)	7.0 (44.6)	3.6 (38.5)	1.1 (34.0)	5.9 (42.6)
Average precipitation mm (inches)	48.9 (1.93)	38.6 (1.52)	35.9 (1.41)	44.5 (1.75)	45.8 (1.80)	65.0 (2.56)	58.8 (2.31)	57.4 (2.26)	53.0 (2.09)	58.2 (2.29)	59.9 (2.36)	53.5 (2.11)	619.4 (24.39)
Average precipitation days (≥ 1.0 mm)	10.6	9.5	8.8	9.0	8.9	9.6	9.6	9.4	9.4	10.4	11.9	11.0	118.1
Source: Met Office

== Transport ==
=== Rail ===
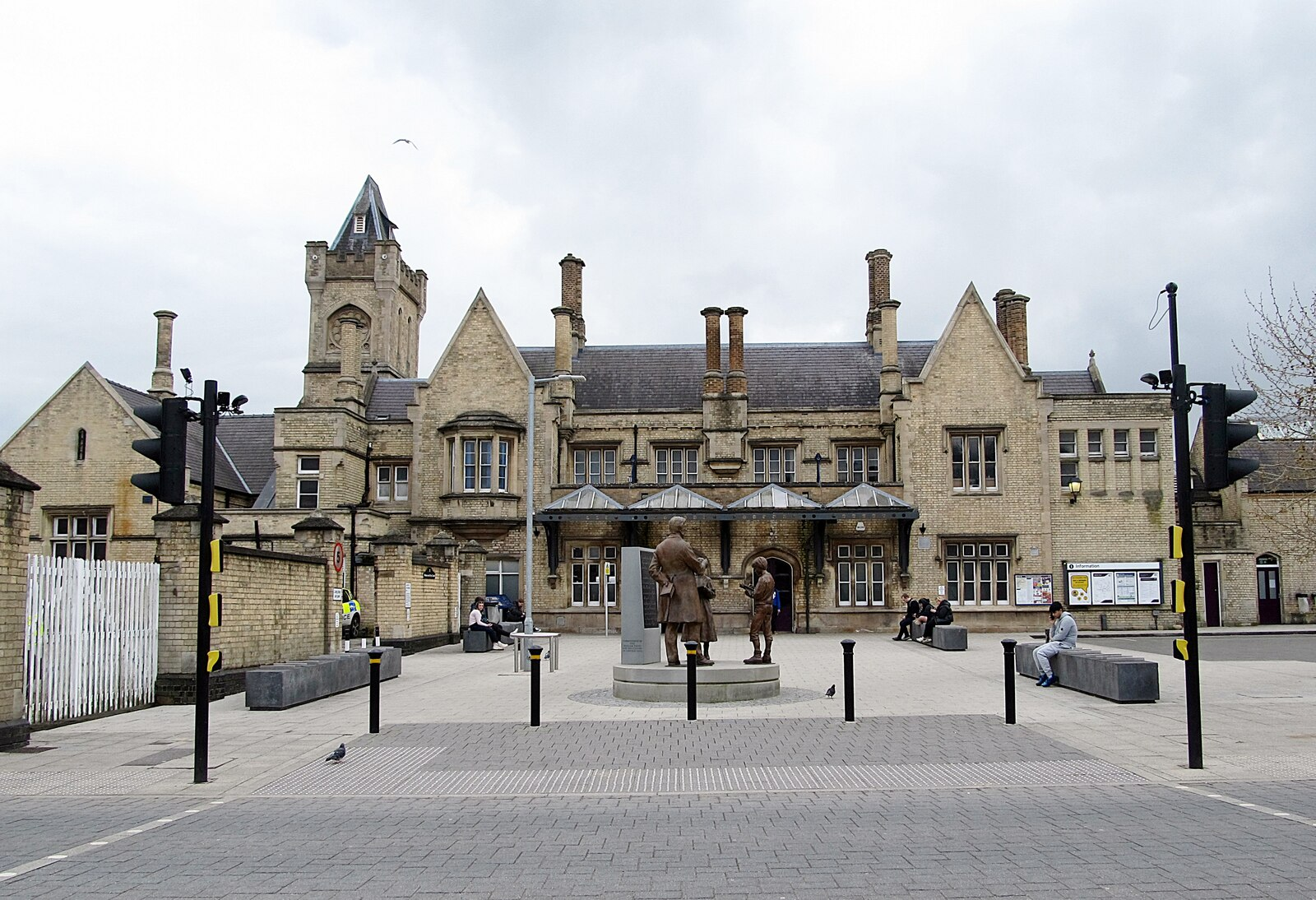
Lincoln railway station

Lincoln railway station is at the meeting point of four railway lines, which run to Newark, Gainsborough, Grimsby and Sleaford. It is served by direct trains to London King's Cross, Leicester, Nottingham, Sheffield, Doncaster, Grimsby Town and Peterborough. Hykeham railway station is located in the southwestern suburbs and is served by local trains on the line to Newark.

The city was previously served by three other railway lines: the Lincolnshire loop line, the Lancashire, Derbyshire and East Coast Railway and the Grantham and Lincoln railway line Trains on the Newark line formerly stopped at Lincoln St Marks, a separate station to the south, until they were diverted to the current station in 1985. Its site is now part of a shopping park.

=== Road ===
The city lies on the A57, A46, A15 and A158 roads. These bring high levels of through traffic and bypasses have been built. To the north west is the £19-million A46 bypass opened in December 1985. On 19 December 2020 the £122-million A15 Eastern bypass was completed. A southern bypass, the North Hykeham relief road, is due to start construction in 2025 and will be the final section of a complete ring road around the city.

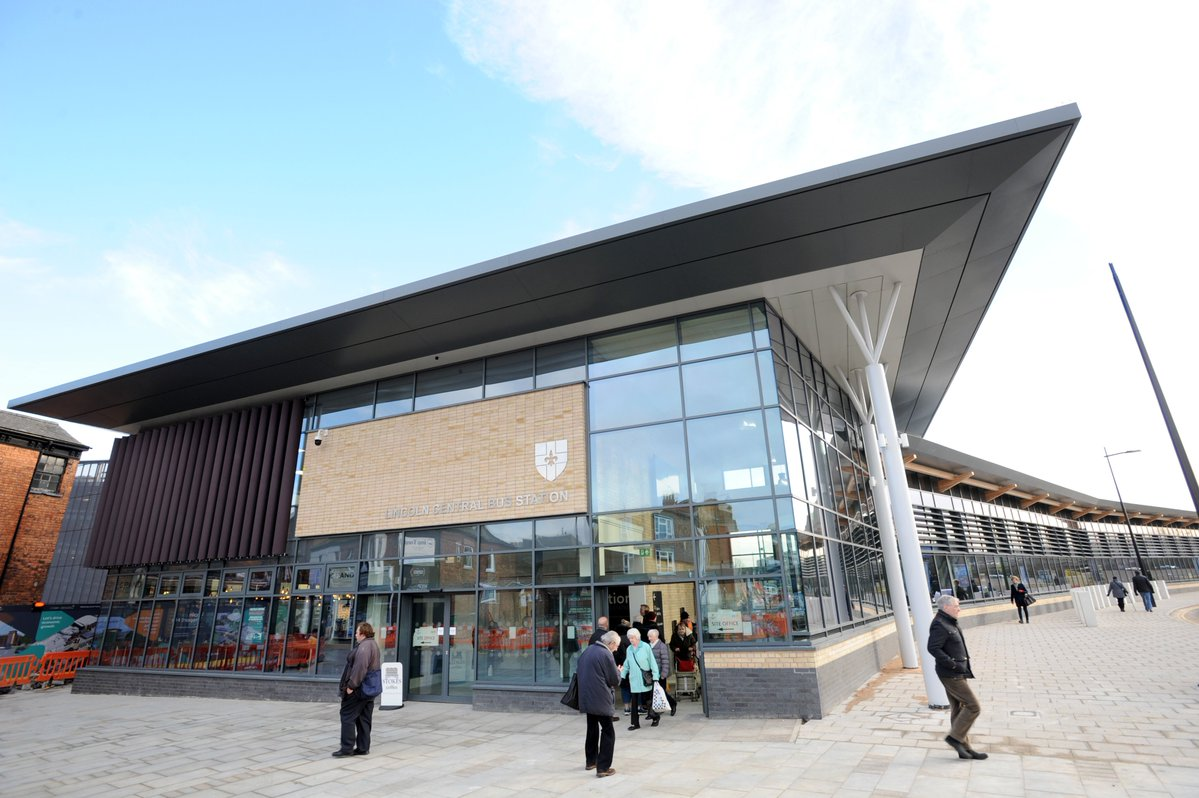
Lincoln Transport Hub

Until the 1980s, two trunk roads passed through Lincoln: the A46 and A15, both feeding traffic along the High Street. At the intersection of Guildhall Street and the High Street, the roads met at the termination of the A57. North of the city centre, the former A15 (Riseholme Road) is now the B1226, and the old A46 (Nettleham Road) is now the B1182. The early northern inner ring-road, formed of Yarborough Road and Yarborough Crescent, is numbered B1273.

=== Air ===
East Midlands Airport, 43 miles from Lincoln, is the main international airport serving the county. It mainly handles European flights with low-cost airlines. Humberside Airport, 29 miles north of Lincoln, is the only civilian airport located in the county. It has a small number of flights mainly to hub airports such as Amsterdam Schiphol Airport. From 2005 until 2022, Doncaster Sheffield Airport also served Lincoln.

== Education ==
=== Higher education ===
The older of Lincoln's two higher education institutions, Lincoln Bishop University, was started as a teacher training college linked to the Anglican Church in 1862. During the 1990s it branched out into other subject areas with a focus on the arts and drama. It became a university college in 2006 with degree powers taken over from the University of Leicester. It gained university status in 2012. An annual graduation celebration takes place in Lincoln Cathedral.

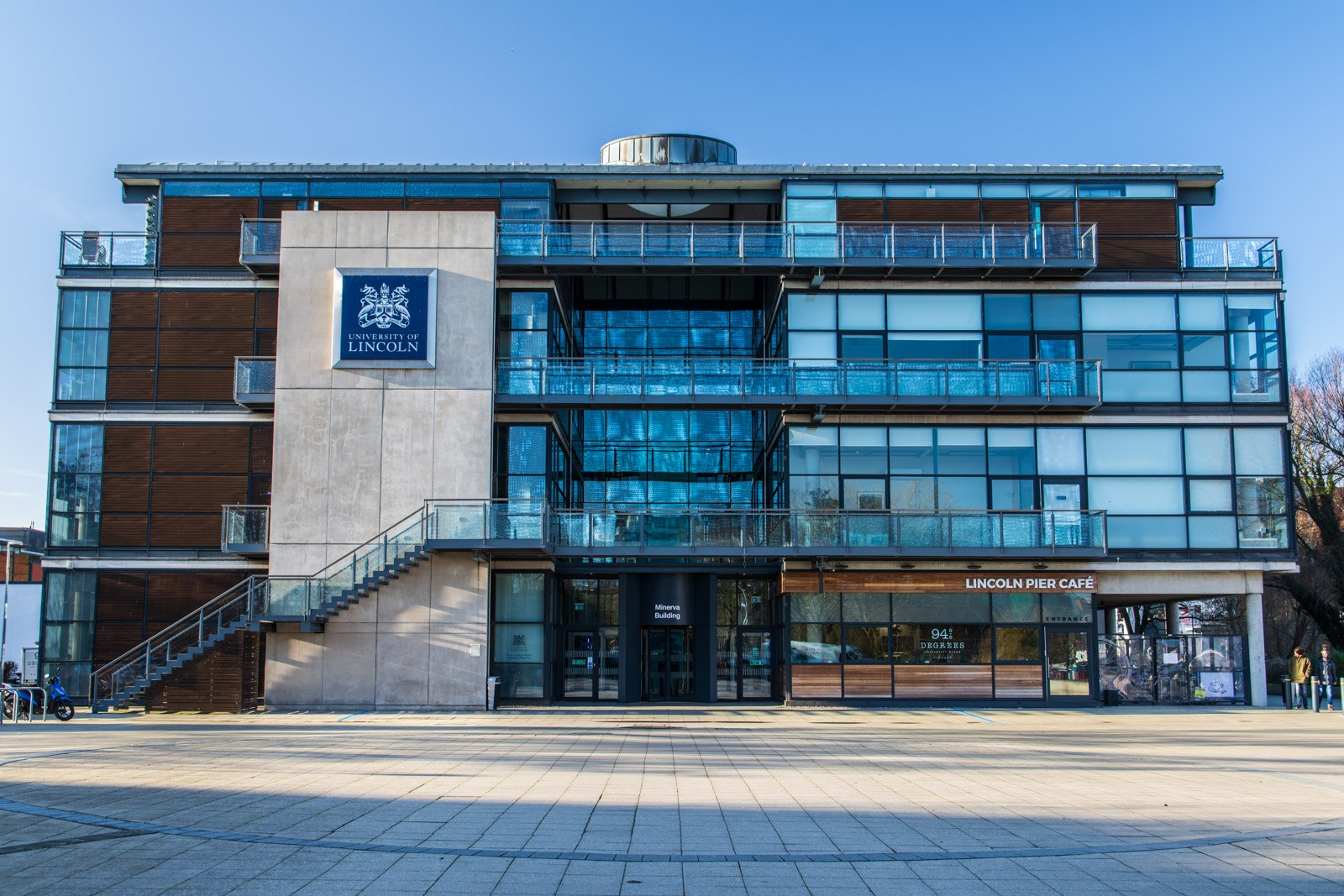
University of Lincoln

The larger University of Lincoln started as the University of Lincolnshire and Humberside in 1996, when the University of Humberside opened a Lincoln campus next to Brayford Pool. Lincoln School of Art and Design (which was Lincolnshire's main outlet for higher education) and Riseholme Agricultural College, previously part of De Montfort University in Leicester, were absorbed into the University of Lincoln in 2001, and subsequently the Lincoln campus took priority over the Hull campus.

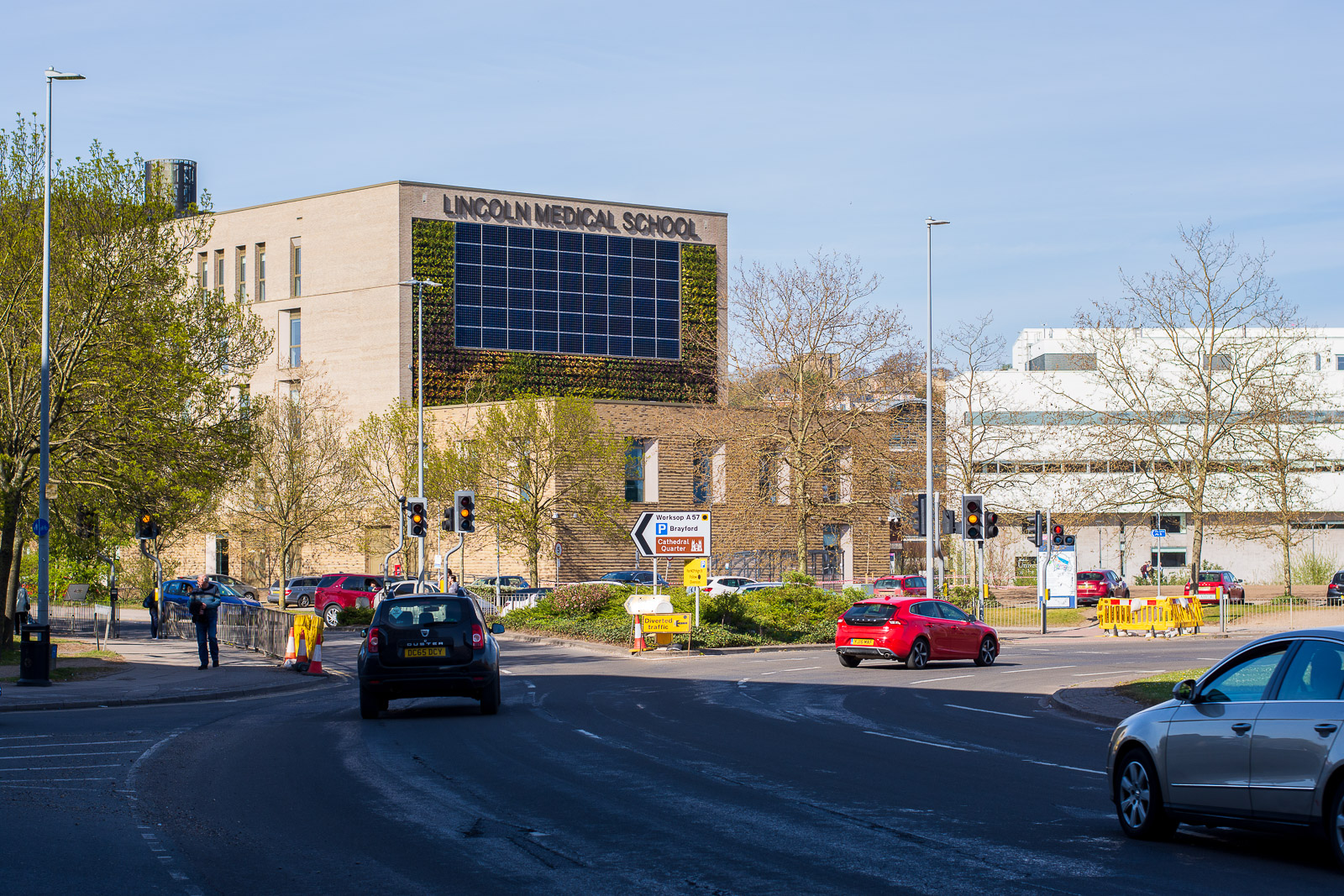
Lincoln Medical School, University of Lincoln

The name changed to the University of Lincoln in September 2002. In the 2021–2022 academic year, a total of 18,705 university students studied in the city.

=== Further education ===
Further education in Lincoln is provided by Lincoln College, Lincolnshire's largest education institution with 18,500 students, 2,300 of them full-time. There is a specialist creative college, Access Creative, offering courses in music, media and games design to some 180 students, all full-time.

=== Schools ===
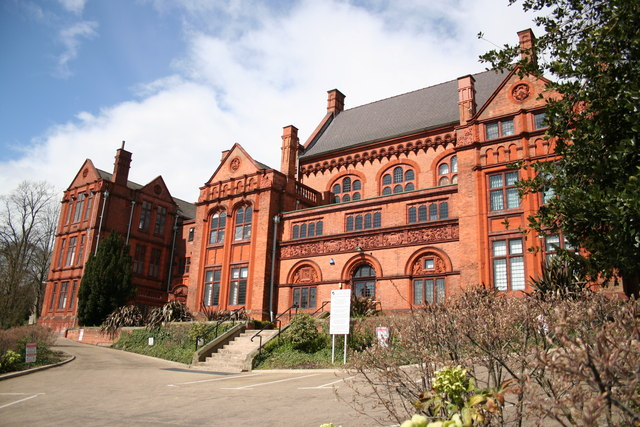
Former Lincoln Christ's Hospital Girls' High School, now occupied by Lincoln University Technical College

The school system in Lincoln is anomalous within Lincolnshire despite being part of the same local education authority (LEA), as most of the county retained the grammar-school system.

In 1952, William Farr School was founded in Welton, a nearby village. Lincoln itself had four single-sex grammar schools until September 1974.

The Priory Academy LSST converted to academy status in 2008, in turn establishing The Priory Federation of Academies. The Priory Witham Academy was formed when the federation absorbed Moorlands Infant School, Usher Junior School and Ancaster High School. The Priory City of Lincoln Academy was formed when the City of Lincoln Community College merged into the federation. Both schools were rebuilt after substantial investment by the federation. Cherry Willingham School joined the federation in 2017, becoming The Priory Pembroke Academy.

The Lincolnshire LEA was ranked 32nd in the country based on its proportion of pupils attaining at least 5 A–C grades at GCSE including maths and English (62.2% compared with a national average of 58.2%).

There are four special-needs schools in Lincoln: Fortuna Primary School (5–11 year olds), Sincil Sports College (11–16), St Christopher's School (3–16) and St Francis Community Special School (2–18).

== Media ==
The local newspaper, the Lincolnshire Echo, was founded in 1894. Local radio stations are BBC Radio Lincolnshire on 94.9 FM, its commercial rival Greatest Hits Radio Lincolnshire on 102.2FM, Hits Radio Lincolnshire on DAB and Lincoln City Radio on 103.6 FM a community radio station catering mainly for listeners over 50. The Lincolnite was an online mobile publication covering the greater-Lincoln area since 2010 but ceased trading in August 2024. There used to be another station named Siren FM, operated by the University of Lincoln, but it ceased broadcasting at the end of June 2024 and the licences have been handed back to Ofcom.

The student publication The Linc is available online and in print and targets the University of Lincoln's student population.

Local TV coverage is provided by BBC Yorkshire and Lincolnshire and ITV Yorkshire which is received from the Belmont TV transmitter. The Waltham TV transmitter can also be received in the city that broadcast BBC East Midlands and ITV Central.

== Sport ==
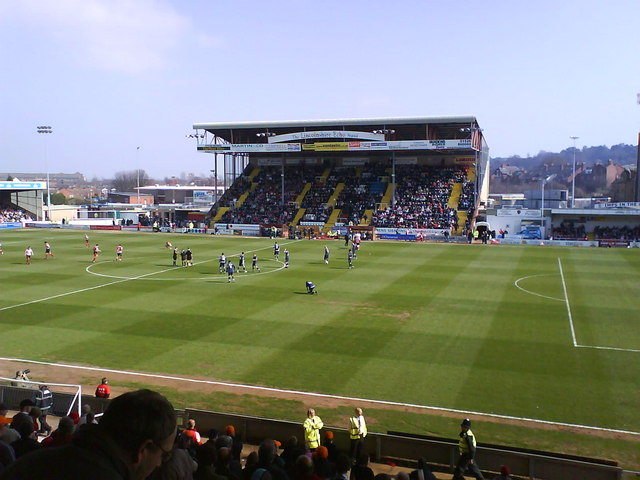
Sincil Bank, home of Lincoln City F.C.

Lincoln's professional football team is Lincoln City FC, nicknamed "The Imps", which plays at the Sincil Bank stadium on the southern edge of the city. The collapse of ITV Digital, which owed Lincoln City FC more than £100,000, in 2002 saw the team faced with bankruptcy, but it was saved by a fund-raising venture among fans, which returned ownership of the club to them, where it has remained since. The club was the first to be relegated from the English Football League, when automatic relegation to the Football Conference was introduced from the 1986–87 season. Lincoln City regained its league place at the first attempt and held onto it until the 2010–11 season, when it was again relegated to the Football Conference.

Lincoln City was the first club managed by Graham Taylor, who went on to manage the England national football team from 1990 to 1993. He was at Lincoln City from 1972 to 1977, during which time the club won promotion from the Fourth Division as champions in 1976. The club also won the Football League Division Three North title on three separate occasions, a joint record. It enjoyed success in the early 1980s, winning promotion from the Fourth Division in 1981 and narrowly missing promotion to the Second Division in the two years that followed.

The club is currently enjoying what many perceive to be a golden era, having won four trophies since 2017. Under Danny Cowley the club achieved promotion from the National League in the 2016-17 season, whilst also becoming the first non-league side to reach the quarter-finals of the FA Cup in 103 years, beating several teams in the top two tiers of English football before being defeated by Arsenal. The club then won the EFL Trophy in 2017–18, Football League Two in the 2018–2019 season, and League One in 2025–26 with 103 points - the second-highest total in division history. The club is currently managed by Tom Shaw and Chris Cohen, and is the only side in the English professional game to have joint head coaches.

Lincoln is also home to Lincoln United FC, Lincoln Moorlands Railway FC and Lincoln Griffins Ladies FC.

Lincoln hosts other sports facilities such American football's Lincolnshire Bombers, which plays in the BAFA National Leagues, the Lincolnshire Bombers Roller Girls, the Imposters Rollergirls, and hosts Lincoln Rowing centre on the River Witham. Lindum Hockey Club plays in the north of the city. Since 1956 the city has played host to the Lincoln Grand Prix one-day cycle race, which for some 30 years has used a city-centre finishing circuit incorporating the challenging 1-in-6 cobbled ascent of Michaelgate. Since 2013 the city has had a professional wrestling promotion and training academy, Lincoln Fight Factory Wrestling. The Lincoln Lions rugby union team has been playing since 1902.

Two short-lived greyhound racing tracks were opened by Lincolnshire Greyhound Racing Association. One was the Highfield track in Hykeham Road, which opened on 13 September 1931, and the second the Lincoln Speedway on the Rope Walk, which opened on 4 June 1932. Racing at both was independent, as they were "flapping" tracks unaffiliated to the sport's governing body, the National Greyhound Racing Club.

== Notable people ==
- Aaron of Lincoln (c. 1125–1186), medieval Jewish financier
- Marlon Beresford (born 1969), professional footballer.
- Gary Blades (born 1980), professional darts player competing in the Professional Darts Corporation
- George Boole (1815–1864), mathematician, developer of Boolean logic, born in Lincoln in 1815
- Peter Buravytskiy (born 2001), trampoline gymnast
- William Byrd (c. 1539–40 or 1543–1623), composer, organist attached to Lincoln Cathedral from 1563 to 1572
- George Francis Carline (1855–1920), artist, born in Lincoln
- Jamie Clapham (born 1975), former professional footballer. He currently a first-team coach at Barnsley F.C.
- Sam Clucas (born 1990), footballer, who currently plays with Oldham Athletic A.F.C. He was born and attended school in Lincoln.
- Peter Day (born 1947), broadcaster. He attended Lincoln Grammar School.
- Penelope Fitzgerald (1916–2000), novelist, biographer, born Penelope Mary Knox in 1916
- Keith Fordyce (1928–2011), broadcaster, born in Lincoln
- Lee Frecklington (born 1985), footballer. He last played for the League One side Lincoln City.
- Sheila Gish (1942-2005), Olivier Award winning actress
- James Hall (historian) (1846–1914), born and raised in Lincoln before leaving for teacher training in 1864, he subsequently settled in Cheshire
- Francis Hill (1899–1980), local historian, mayor of Lincoln and Chancellor of the University of Nottingham, born in Lincoln in 1899
- William Hilton (1786–1839), portrait and history painter, born in Lincoln
- John Hurt (1940–2017), actor. He attended Lincoln School.
- Colonel John Hutchinson (1615–1664), Roundhead politician and signatory to the death warrant of King Charles I. He attended Lincoln Free School.
- Benjamin Lany (1591–1675), academic, royal chaplain and religious writer. He was Bishop of Lincoln in 1663–1667.
- Colin Louis Avern Leakey (1933–2018), plant scientist, died in Lincoln
- Trevor Lock (born 1973), English comedian, actor and playwright was born in Lincoln.
- William Logsdail (1859–1944), painter, born in Lincoln
- Mary Mackie (née Kathleen Mary Whitlam, living), novelist and non-fiction writer, born in Lincoln in the Second World War, she attended Lincoln Christ's Hospital High School
- Karen Maitland (born 1956), English author of medieval thriller fiction
- Neville Marriner (1924–2016), violinist, conductor, founder of the Academy of St Martin in the Fields, born in Lincoln and educated at Lincoln Grammar School
- Ross McLaren (born 1991), actor, born in Lincoln
- Rose Mead (1867–1946), portrait painter. She attended Lincoln School of Art.
- Henry Whitehead Moss (1841–1917), born at Lincoln, he went to Lincoln School before attending Shrewsbury School where he became headmaster
- Paul Palmer (born 1974), swimmer who won an Olympic silver medal at the Atlanta Olympic Games in 1996, he was twice a short-course world champion
- William Pool (c. 1783–1856), maritime inventor. He worked in Lincoln in the 1820s and 1830s.
- Thomas Pownall (1722–1805), politician, Governor of the Province of Massachusetts Bay
- Steve Race (1921–2009), musician, broadcaster, host of Radio 4's My Music 1967–1993. He was born in Lincoln and attended Lincoln School in 1932–1939.
- Emma Amy Rea (1865–1927), mycologist and fellow of the Linnean Society of London
- Fanny Robertson (1765–1855), actress and theatre owner, manager of The Lincoln Circuit of theatres
- David Robinson (born 1930), film critic and author, official biographer of Charlie Chaplin.
- Charlotte Scott (1858–1931), mathematician, born in Lincoln
- Anna Soubry Barrister and former politician was born in the city.
- Lee Swaby (born 1976), former professional boxer at both cruiserweight and heavyweight divisions
- John Taylor (1781–1864), publisher of John Keats and John Clare. He attended Lincoln Grammar School.
- William Tritton (1875–1946), Chairman of William Foster & Co. Ltd from 1911 to 1939, directly involved in developing the military vehicle, the tank
- James Ward Usher (1845–1921), jeweller and philanthropist. He spent his life in the city.
- William T. Warrener (1861–1934), English painter, born in Lincoln in 1861. He attended Lincoln School of Art.
- Juan Watterson (born 1980), Manx politician, Speaker of the House of Keys. He studied at the University of Lincoln.
- Victor Wells-Cole (1897–1987), first-class cricketer, British Army officer

== International relations ==
=== Twin towns ===
Lincoln is twinned with:

- Neustadt an der Weinstraße, Rhineland-Palatinate, Germany (since 1969)
- Port Lincoln, SA, Australia (since 1991)
- Radomsko, Łódź Voivodeship, Poland (since 2007)
- Tangshan, Hebei, China (since 1988)
- Nanchang, Jiangxi, China (since 2014)

== Freedom of the city ==
The following people and military units have received the Freedom of the City of Lincoln.

=== Individuals ===
- Edward Fiennes-Clinton, 18th Earl of Lincoln: 1989
- Lord Cormack: 18 March 2022.

=== Military units ===
- RAF Waddington: 25 April 1959.
- RAF Scampton: 14 May 1993.
- 2nd Battalion The Royal Anglian Regiment: 1997.
- The Grenadier Guards: 8 May 2008.

== Arms ==
Coat of arms of Lincoln, England

Escutcheon
Argent on a cross Gules a fleur-de-lis Or
Motto
Civitas Lincolnia, or Floreat Lindum

== See also ==
=== Attractions ===
- Empowerment
- Jew's House
- Jew's Court
- Lincoln Arboretum
- Lincoln Castle
- Lincoln Cathedral
- Lincoln City F.C.
- Lincoln Imp
- Museum of Lincolnshire Life
- Newport Arch
- Norman House
- Steep Hill
- The Collection (Lincolnshire)
- The Lawn, Lincoln
- Usher Gallery
- Viking Way

=== Places and buildings ===
- Boultham
- The Engine Shed
- Hartsholme Country Park
- High Street, Lincoln
- Lincoln Bishop University
- Lincoln Drill Hall
- Lincoln Medieval Bishop's Palace
- Lincoln Performing Arts Centre
- Lincoln Racecourse
- Listed buildings in Lincoln, England
- New Theatre Royal Lincoln
- Ritz Theatre (Lincoln, England)
- Sincil Bank
- St Catherine's, Lincoln
- Steep Hill
- St Hugh's Church, Lincoln
- St Swithin's Church, Lincoln
- University of Lincoln

=== People ===
- Aaron of Lincoln
- Hugh of Lincoln
- Little Saint Hugh of Lincoln
- Jason Maxwell

=== Societies and groups ===
- The Lincoln Philosophy Café
- Lincoln Record Society
- Society for Lincolnshire History and Archaeology at Jew's Court
