= Jason Maxwell (footballer) =

English footballer (born 1972)

Personal information
- Full name: Jason Maxwell
- Date of birth: 23 January 1974 (age 52)
- Place of birth: Lincoln, England
- Position: Forward

Youth career
- Scunthorpe United

Senior career*
Years	Team	Apps	(Gls)
1990–1993	Appleby Frodingham		
1993	Scunthorpe United	3	(0)
1993–1998	Gainsborough Trinity		
1998–2004	Bradford Park Avenue		
2004–2005	Gainsborough Trinity		
2005–2006	Buxton		
2006–2010	Brigg Town		
- * Club domestic league appearances and goals

Jason Maxwell (born 1 September 1972) is an English former professional footballer who played as a forward. He played in the Football League for Scunthorpe United.

== Playing career ==
Maxwell played as a junior for Scunthorpe United, but joined non-league side Appleby Frodingham before returning to the Iron where he played in the Football League during the 1992–93 season. He went on to have two spells with Gainsborough Trinity, as well as playing for Bradford Park Avenue, Buxton and Brigg Town.

As a Non-league player, Maxwell reached the FA Cup first round twice. During the 1997–98 season he was part of the Gainsborough team who were defeated 3-2 by Lincoln City in a replay, having drawn the first game 1–1 at Sincil Bank. During the 2003–04 season he was part of the Avenue side that lost 5–2 at home to Bristol City.

== Personal life ==
Maxwell plays amateur football in the Hull veterans League, representing the veteran wing of his former team Appleby Frodingham.
