= West End, Lincoln =

Area of Lincoln in Lincolnshire England

Coordinates: 53.234622°N 0.552827°W

West End
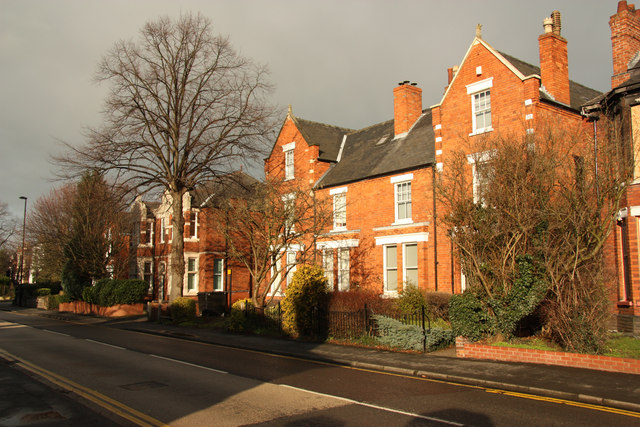
- West Parade in the West End

- Location within Lincolnshire
  - London: 157 mi (253 km) S
- Civil parish: Unparished
- District: Lincoln
- Shire county: Lincolnshire
- Region: East Midlands
- Country: England
- Sovereign state: United Kingdom
- Post town: Lincoln
- Postcode district: LN1
- Dialling code: 01522
- Police: Lincolnshire
- Fire: Lincolnshire
- Ambulance: East Midlands
- UK Parliament: Lincoln

West End is a historic district of Lincoln in the county of Lincolnshire, England. It is located to the west of the city centre and is home to the former Lincoln Racecourse, which is now a community hub. West Common formed part of the historic Roman city. Long Leys Road forms part of the boundary of the historic West End.
