= Empowerment (sculpture) =

Coordinates: 53°13′42″N 0°32′20″W

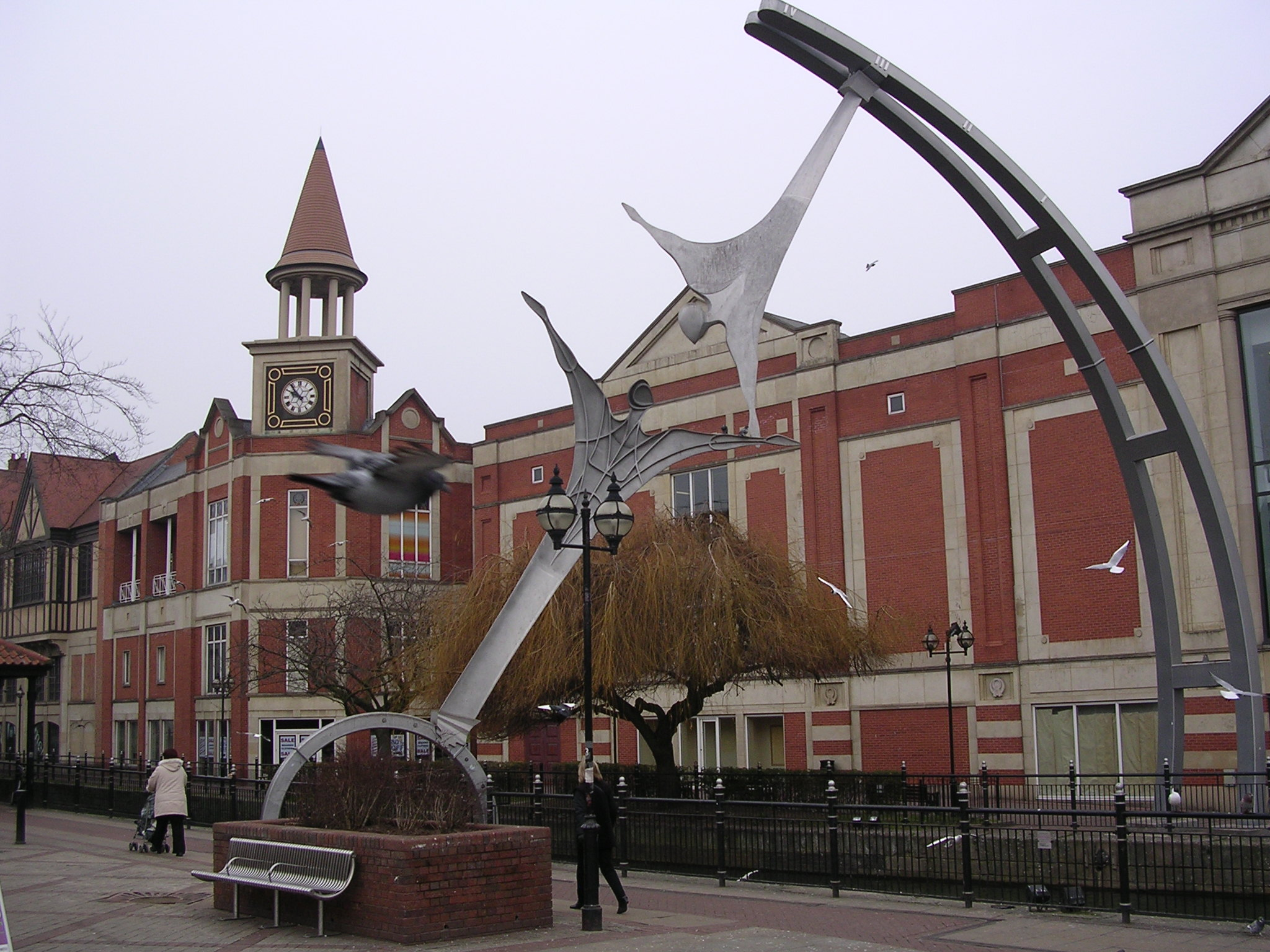
- Empowerment in front of Waterside Shopping Centre
- Artist: Stephen Broadbent
- Completion date: 2002
- Medium: Aluminium-and-steel
- Dimensions: 1600 cm (630 in)
- Owner: Lincoln City Council

Empowerment is a public sculpture in the centre of the city of Lincoln in England.

Designed by the artist Stephen Broadbent, sponsored by Alstom UK Ltd, Lincoln Co-operative Society, and other Lincoln businesses and organisations, donated to Lincoln City Council.

The sculpture was completed in 2002, unveiled on 2 February, and spans the River Witham in Lincoln's City Square. It takes the form of two aluminium-and-steel human figures reaching to each other across the water. The design is intended to echo the shape of turbine blades, in recognition of Lincoln's industrial heritage, which transform into dynamic figures that reach out to empower one another, just as the blades empower one another within the turbine.

The statue was commissioned with the intent to create a bold and striking sculpture to celebrate the millennium, that spans the River Witham in Lincoln’s city centre and act as a focal point in the space.

At 16 m (17 yd) tall, Empowerment is the largest sculpture in Lincolnshire. Increasingly, it is now used alongside more traditional images of Lincoln — the cathedral and castle — as a recognisable 'tourist emblem' of the city, similar to the adoption of the Angel of the North as a symbol of North East England.
