= Charterholme =

Ongoing development in Lincoln, England

Coordinates: 53.222436°N 0.591535°W

- District
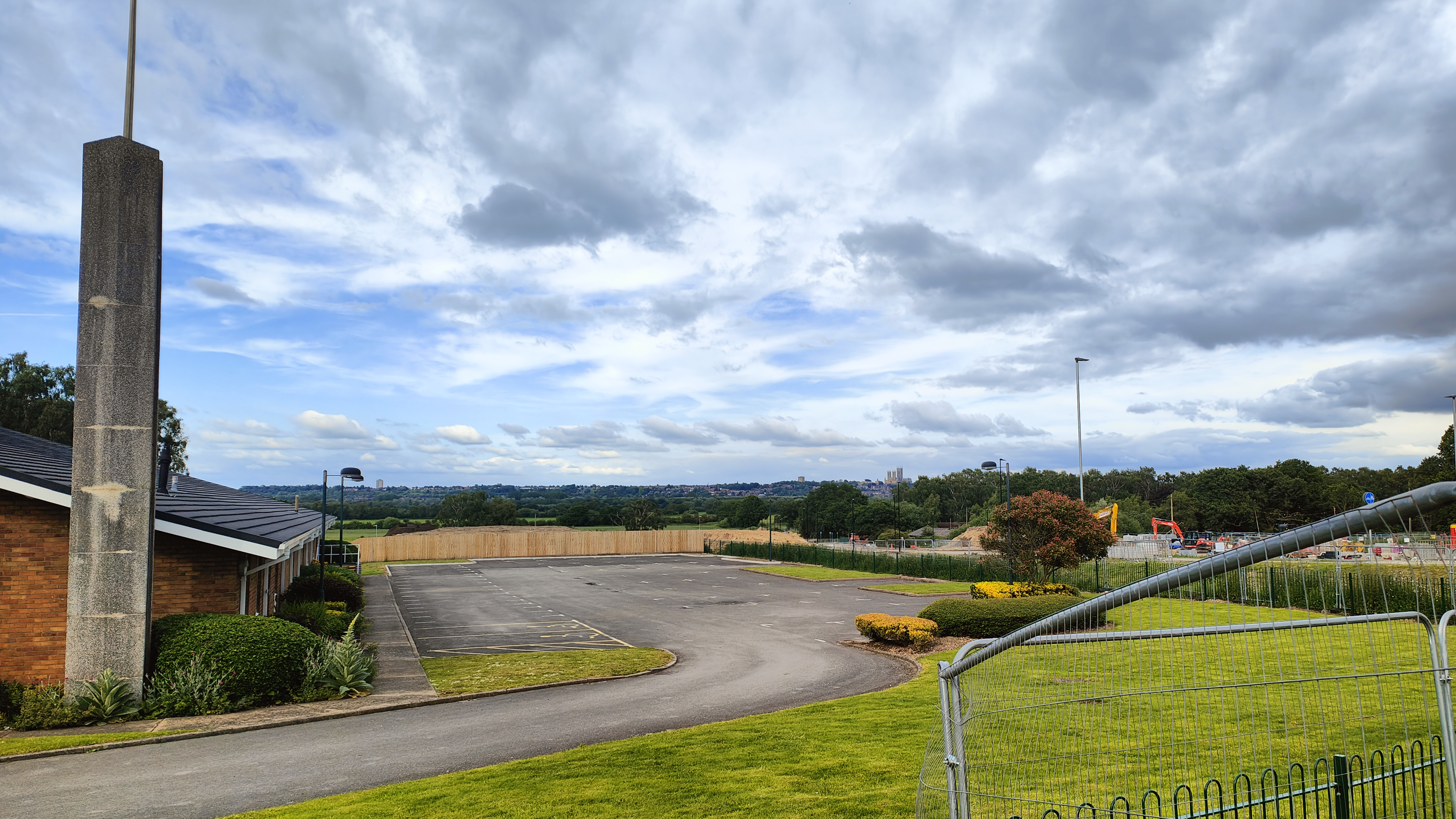
- Charterholme prior to construction, looking from the church of Latter-Day Saints.

- Location within Lincolnshire
- District: Lincoln
- Shire county: Lincolnshire
- Region: East Midlands
- Country: England
- Sovereign state: United Kingdom
- Post town: Lincoln
- Postcode district: LN6
- Police: Lincolnshire
- Fire: Lincolnshire
- Ambulance: East Midlands
- UK Parliament: Lincoln

Charterholme, previously known as Western Growth Corridor is a major urban expansion in the city of Lincoln, in Lincolnshire, England. As of January 2025 it is being built at the junction of Birchwood Avenue and Skellingthorpe Road, close to the A46 road, Birchwood and Skellingthorpe, and work is ongoing to build Charterholme in phases.

== History ==
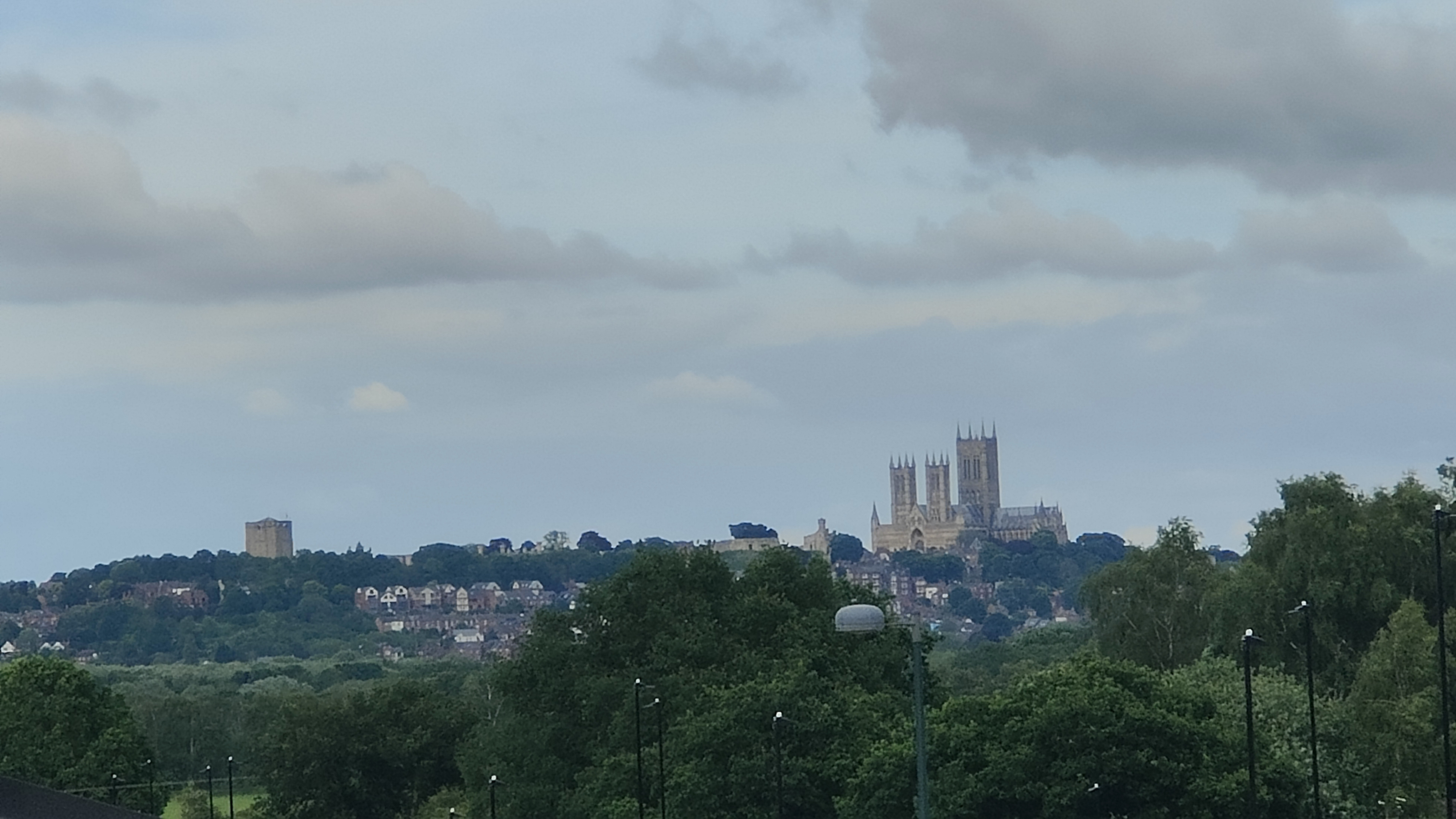
Skyline of Lincoln from where the development is being built

The development was approved in January 2022 upon consent given by the City of Lincoln Council. Work on the project began in August 2023 with temporary traffic lights being installed around Birchwood Avenue and Skellingthorpe Road while equipment and groundworks as well as road alignments and traffic light installations were taking place. This caused issues for locals living nearby due to the bottlenecked traffic during rush hour and the amount of disruption by the works going on. The temporary traffic lights were removed in March 2024. The development was given the name "Charterholme" in December 2024 by Lincoln City Council.

== Proposals for the development ==
The new development is planned to include up to 3,200 new houses on greenbelt land within the City of Lincoln Boundary. It will also include a new primary school, shopping centre and a new stadium for Lincoln City F.C. There are also new road links planned to the city centre between Skellingthorpe Road/Birchwood Avenue and Tritton Road.
