= Ritz Theatre (Lincoln, England) =

Ritz Cinema & Theatre
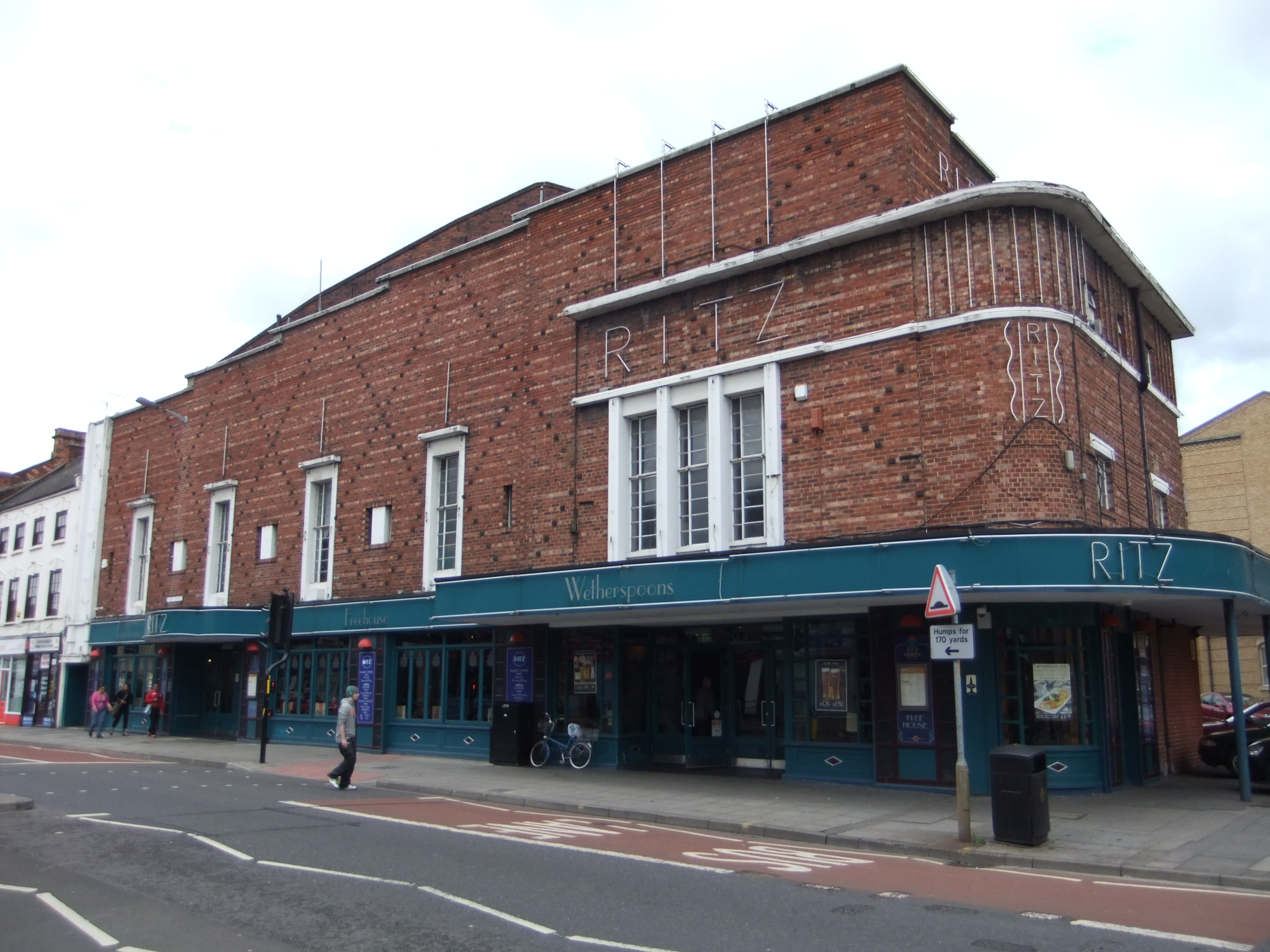
- Interactive map of Ritz Cinema & Theatre
- Address: 143-147 High Street; Lincoln, England; United Kingdom
- Coordinates: 53.224180°N 0.543419°W

Construction
- Opened: 1937

The Ritz is a former cinema and theatre in Lincoln, England, currently in use as a pub.

== History ==
The Ritz was opened in 1932 under the ownership of Gerald Segelman and designed by Scottish architect Leslie C Norton. Seating was over two levels with 1,240 seats in the stalls and 510 in the circle, giving a total capacity of 1,750.

The building was designed primarily as a cinema and its first offering on 22 February 1937 was San Francisco, starring Clark Gable and Jeanette MacDonald. In 1941 the building suffered minor damage due to German bombing.

In 1954 The Ritz became the first cinema in Lincoln to have CinemaScope installed. Two years later, in January 1956, the building was bought by The Rank Organisation and, as result was renamed The Lincoln Odeon. In 1981, The Rank Organisation decided to close the cinema and it stood empty for the next 3 years.

The building regained its original name when it was acquired in 1984 by Lincoln resident Barry Stead. Stead was keen to introduce live performances to the venue as an additional income at a time when cinema audiences were dwindling. However, at the time the building was not suitable for live performance; the stage was only 12 feet deep, there was no fly system, minimal backstage area and no get-in access, meaning that all set and equipment would need to be able to fit through normal-sized doors. Stead set about making improvements which included the construction of a fore-stage which increased the total depth of the stage to 28 feet. As part of these renovations, 5 dressing rooms were also added to the improved backstage area. For the next ten years the venue hosted artists such as Sister Sledge, Howard Keel, and Danny La Rue.

By 1994, however, it was becoming apparent that the large auditorium was no longer cost-effective. Multiplex cinemas provided choice and flexibility that traditional single-screen cinemas could not compete with. As a result, the cinema closed temporarily to allow the conversion of the existing auditorium into a multi-screen venue. In March 1995 the building reopened as the Ritz Film Centre, featuring three screens. The stalls were cut in half with each screen accommodating 300 patrons whilst the former circle was closed off and used to create a single screen with a larger capacity of 485. Although the Ritz was now able to offer audiences a more modern cinema experience, the opening of the purpose-built Warner Cinema with its nine screens made the Ritz all but obsolete.

The Ritz closed once again in January 1998. The building reopened in May 1998 as a JD Wetherspoon public house. The foyer and stalls area had undergone conversion but the former circle and projector room were surplus to requirements.

It wasn't until 2013 that the Ritz regained its cinema status. JD Wetherspoon agreed to lease the now disused circle for it to be re-fitted for cinema use again. Pete Genders was to be the Chief Executive and oversaw the renovation. The new 480 seat venue was to become an art-house cinema and community hub but closed unexpectedly in 2017 after the lease had expired.

The Ritz is included on the Local List of Buildings of Architectural Significance and is defined as a landmark corner building within Conservation Area Number 6.
