= Cornhill Quarter, Lincoln =

Area of Lincoln in Lincolnshire England

Coordinates: 53.228069°N 0.540919°W

Lincoln Cornhill
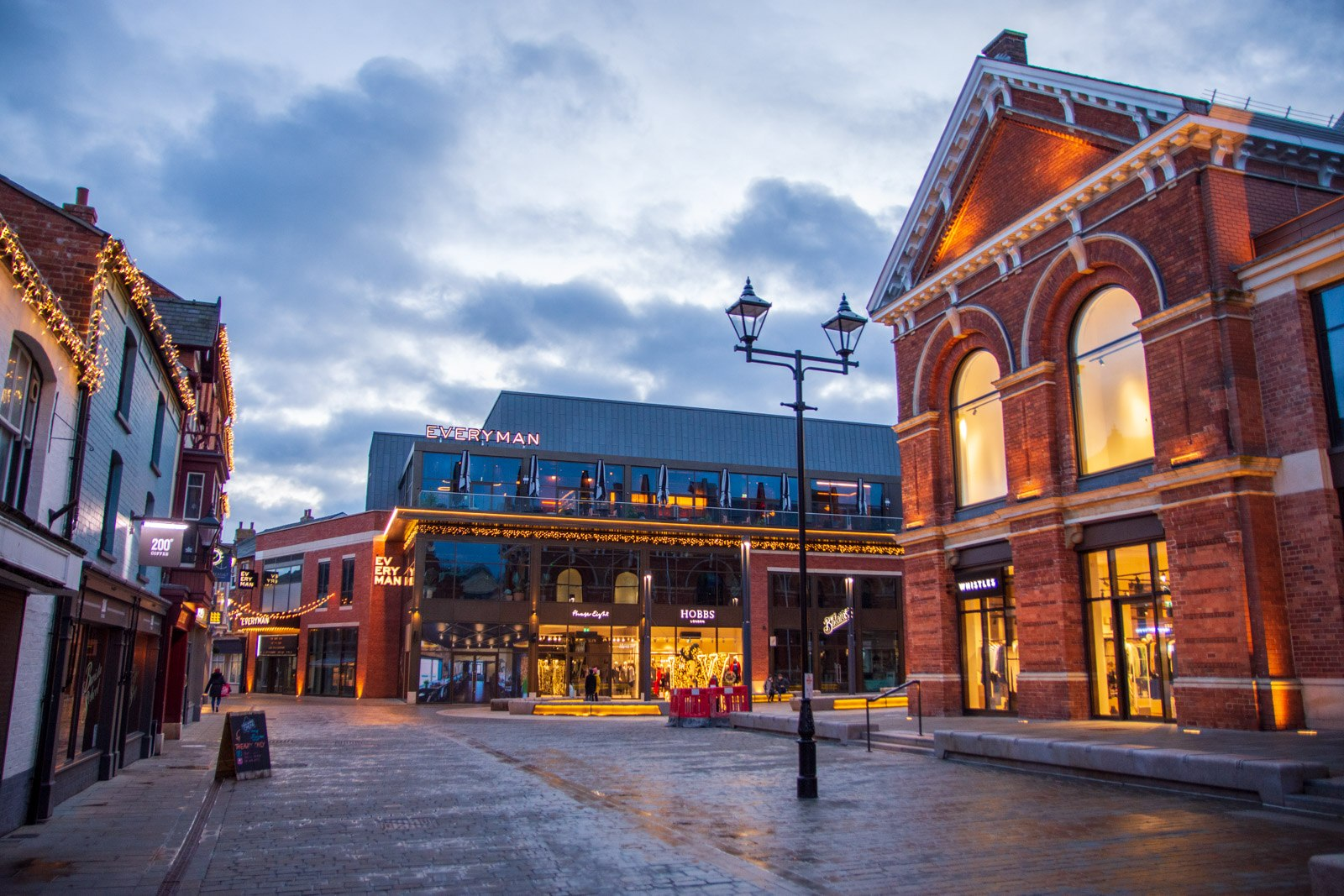
- Sincil Street

- Location within Lincolnshire
- Population: 277
  - London: 157 mi (253 km) S
- Civil parish: Unparished
- District: Lincoln
- Shire county: Lincolnshire
- Region: East Midlands
- Country: England
- Sovereign state: United Kingdom
- Post town: Lincoln
- Postcode district: LN5
- Dialling code: 01522
- Police: Lincolnshire
- Fire: Lincolnshire
- Ambulance: East Midlands
- UK Parliament: Lincoln

Cornhill Quarter, also known as Lincoln Cornhill, is a historic and cultural area of the city of Lincoln in Lincolnshire, England. It takes its name from the nearby former Cornhill building and square on Cornhill and High Street. A £70 million fund regenerated it to enhance and modernize the area while maintaining the original buildings that exist. This included the moving of the bus station and work to demolish the former City Square shopping centre which would be replaced by a hotel and residential flats.
