= Lincoln City Centre =

City and Historical Area of Lincoln in England

Coordinates: 53.226942°N 0.541369°W

- Central Business District
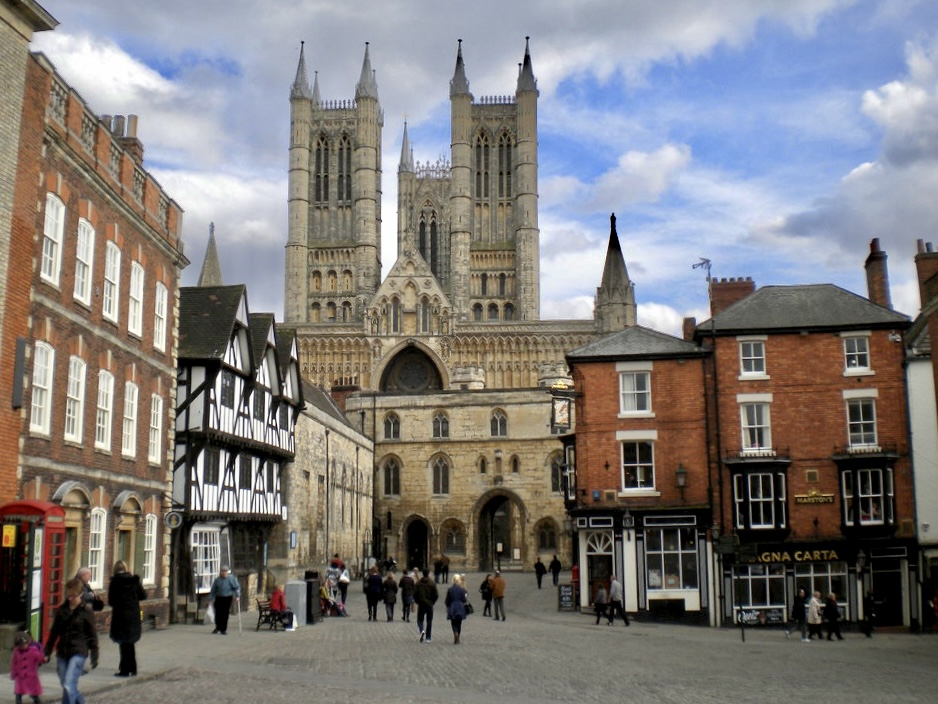
- Lincoln Cathedral

- Location within Lincolnshire
- Area: 35.69 sq mi (92.4 km^{2})
  - London: 158 mi (254 km) SW
- District: City of Lincoln
- Shire county: Lincolnshire
- Region: East Midlands
- Country: England
- Sovereign state: United Kingdom
- Post town: LINCOLN
- Postcode district: LN1-LN5
- Dialling code: 01522
- Police: Lincolnshire
- Fire: Lincolnshire
- Ambulance: East Midlands

Lincoln City Centre is the historical and cultural area of Lincoln in Lincolnshire, England. It is defined as the areas along the city's High Street. Each part of the centre brings a differing main sector or sectors to the city with a small overlap between each area.

== Areas ==
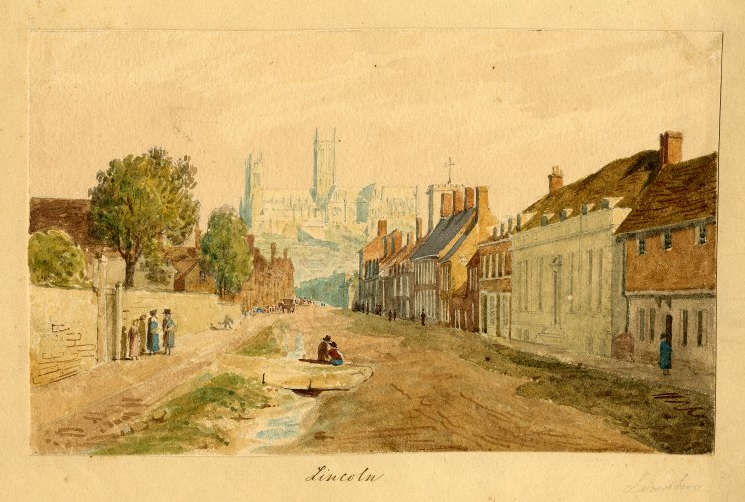
Lincoln High Street around 1820

The city centre is divided into Uphill, Downhill, Steep Hill, Cornhill, Brayford and past the railway station. These areas are connected by the ancient Ermine Street which is known as the High Street, in Downhill the High Street becomes The Strait then Steep Hill connects to Uphill where it becomes Bailgate.

=== Uphill ===
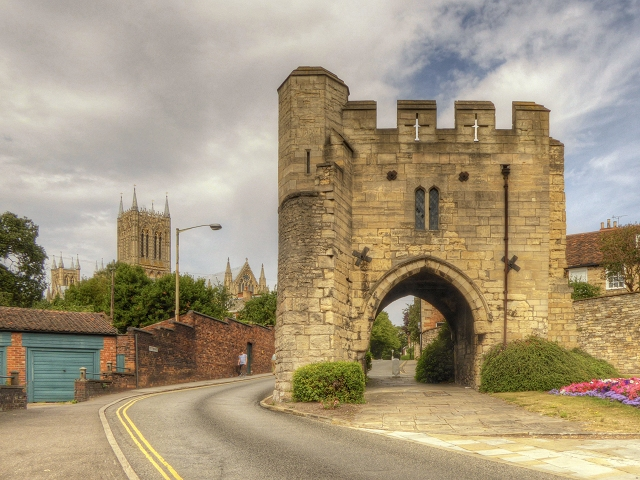
The Pottergate Arch and Lincoln Cathedral

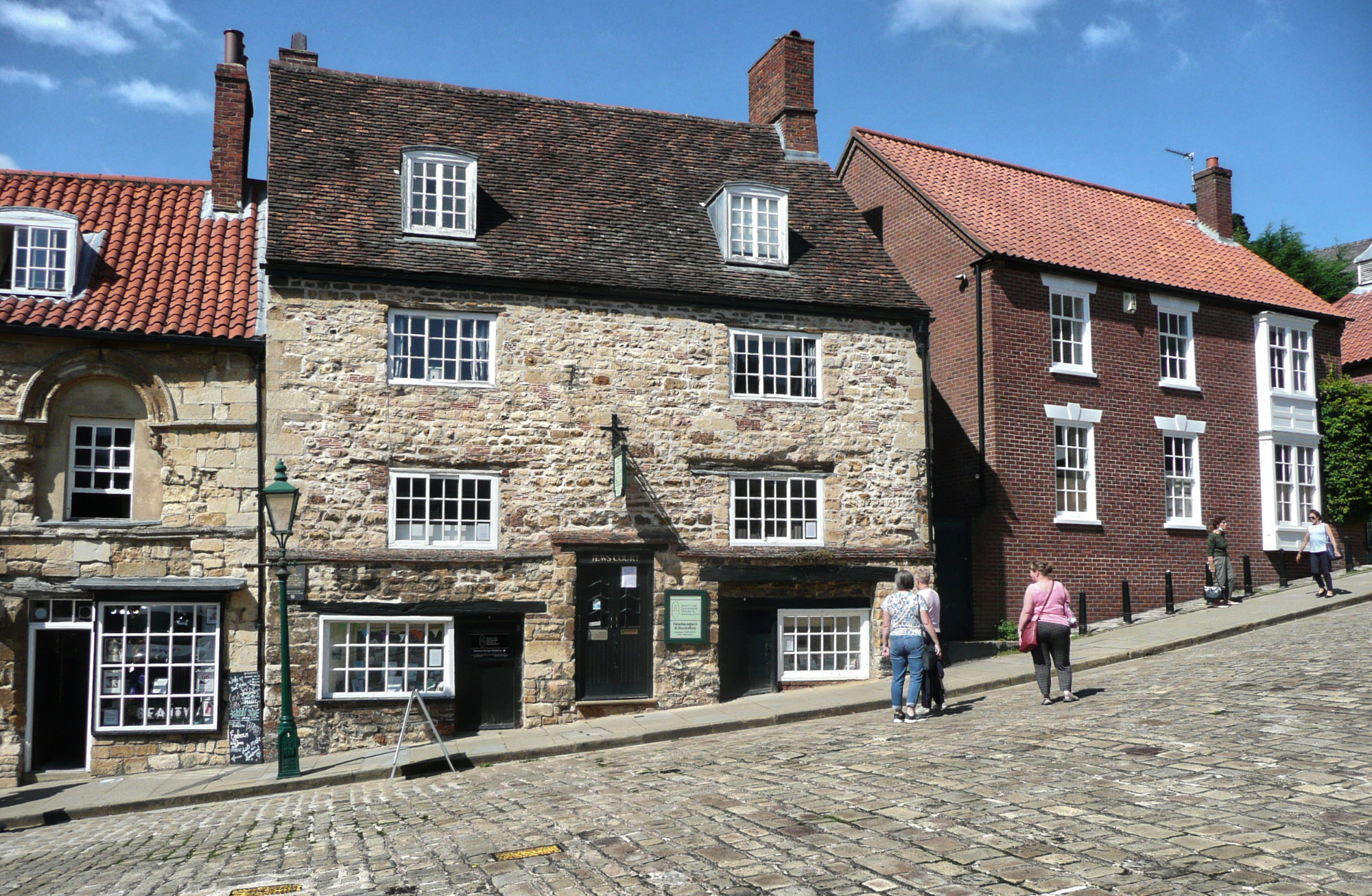
Jew's Court, Lincoln

Uphill is Lincoln's old town with many grade listed buildings dating back to the medieval and roman periods these include Lincoln Cathedral, Lincoln Castle, Pottergate Arch, St Mary Magdalene and Newport Arch on the hill with Jew's House and Norman House on Steep Hill, among other listed buildings.

It has a number of independent small businesses. Castle Square and Bailgate are the centre to Uphill. The square hosts the farmers' market and is the meeting point for Steep Hill, the castle and cathedral.

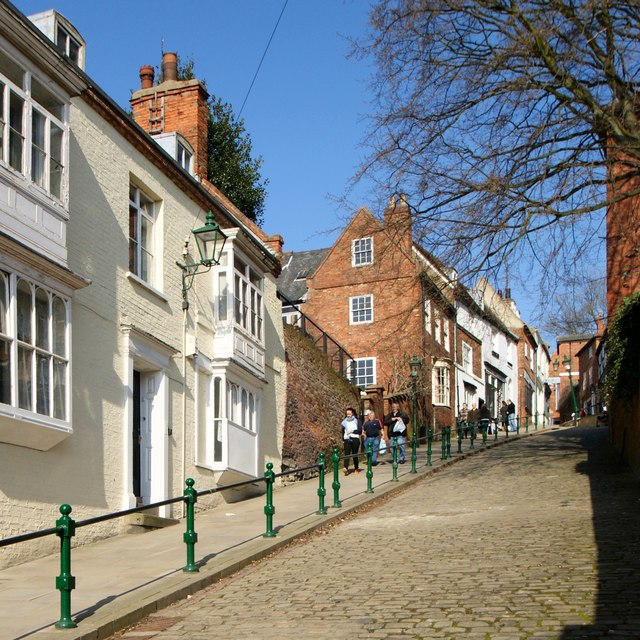
Steep Hill looking north

The hillside area is partly residential. In 2020 a mansion near Lincoln Cathedral was offered for sale at £2 million. Bailgate, Minster Yard, Eastgate and Drury Lane have housing prices ranging from £200,000 to £800,000. Lincoln UTC, an educational institution with a campus called the Greestone Centre, is also on the hill.

=== Downhill ===
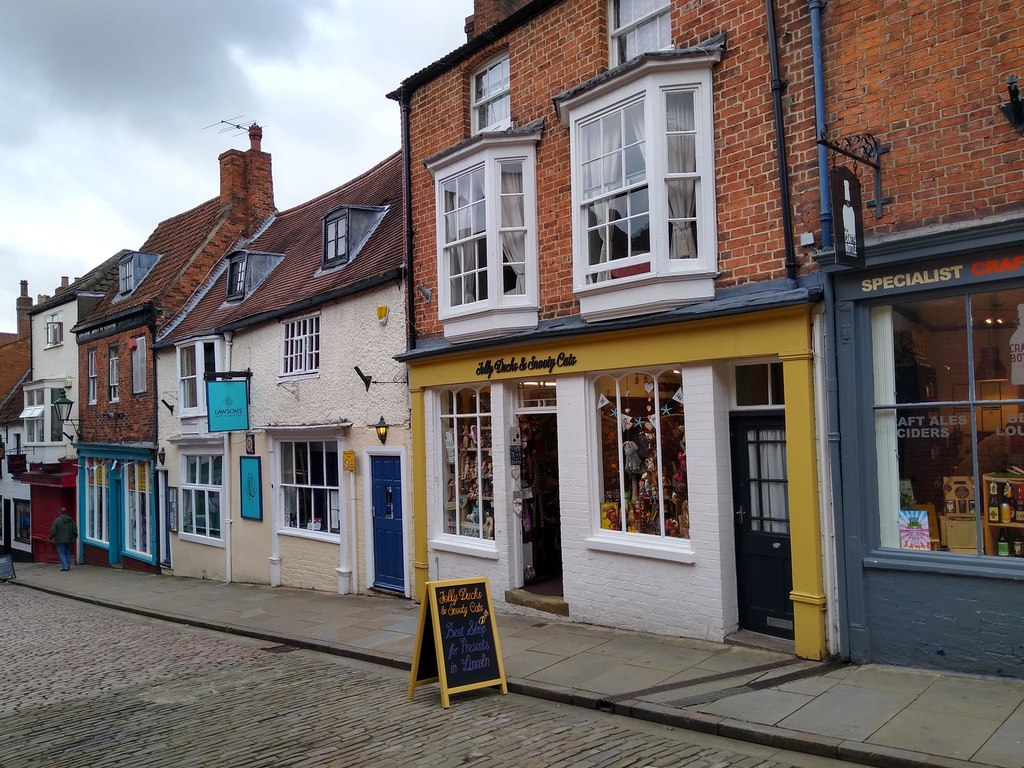
The Strait looking south

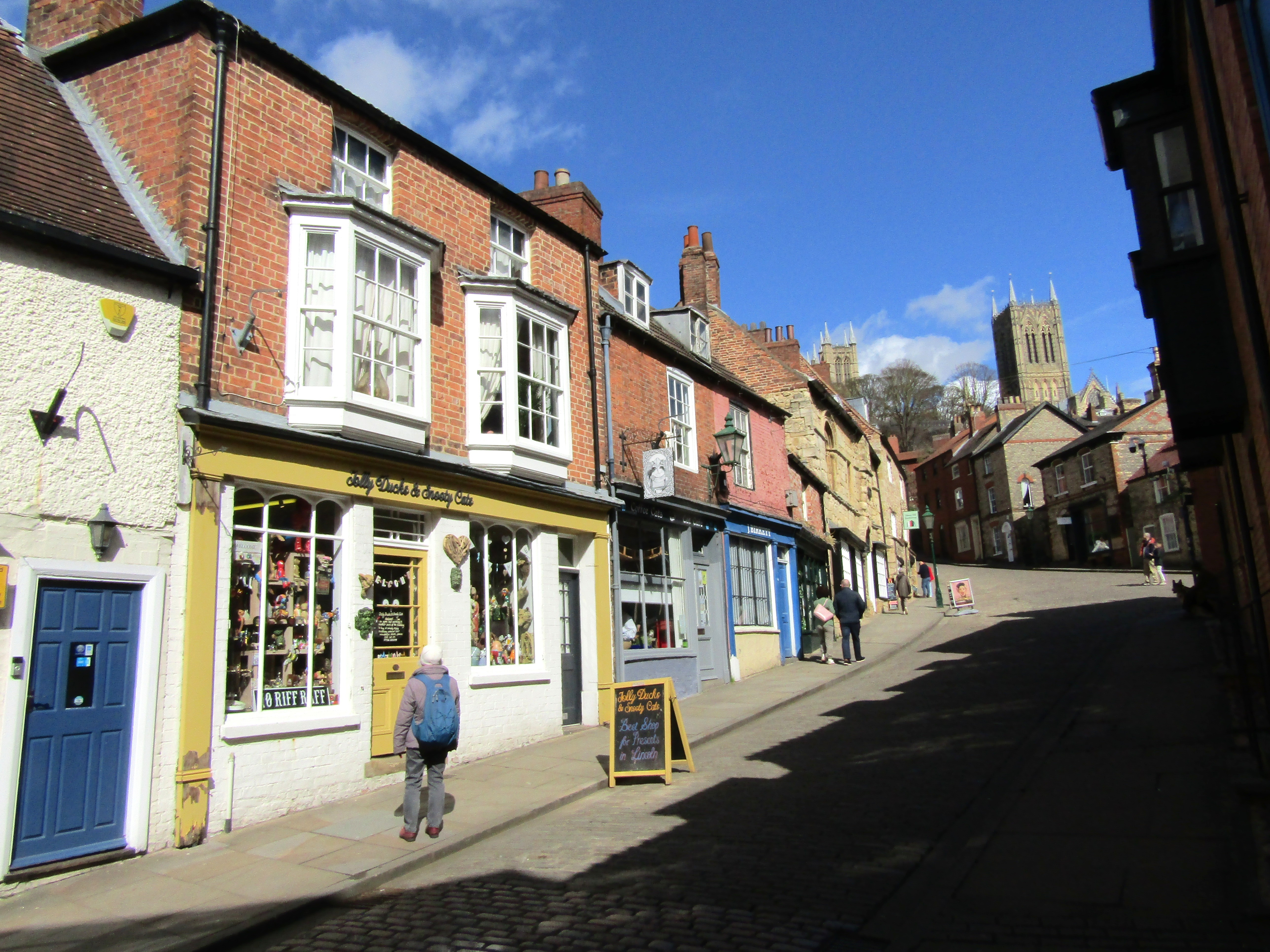
The Strait looking north towards Steep Hill

The High Street is mainly commercial and pedestrian in both Downhill and Cornhill. Downhill is the centre's cultural and nightlife area. It is centred upon the Guildhall and Stonebow. North of the Guildhall there are a number of cultural buildings: the grade II listed New Theatre Royal was built in the area in 1892, it is 'new' because the previous building from 1806 was damaged in a fire; Lincoln Museum and the Usher Gallery. St Hugh's Church (Grade II listed) and Lincoln College are also in the area. North of the Guildhall also formerly included the church of St Peter at Arches and the Georgian Buttermarket which existed from 1737 until 1932: in their place is the former Norwich Union House, which has since been converted into multiple retail outlets. South-east of the Guildhall is Saltergate, Guildhall Street and St Swithins Square. The notable buildings on these streets are The Angel Coffee House, St Swithin's Church which is a Grade II* listed currently closed parish church. The church congregation currently meet opposite the church in a former Co-operative building. Further down the high street is Waterside Shopping Centre and the River Witham which passes under High Bridge which the High Street is on.

=== Cornhill ===
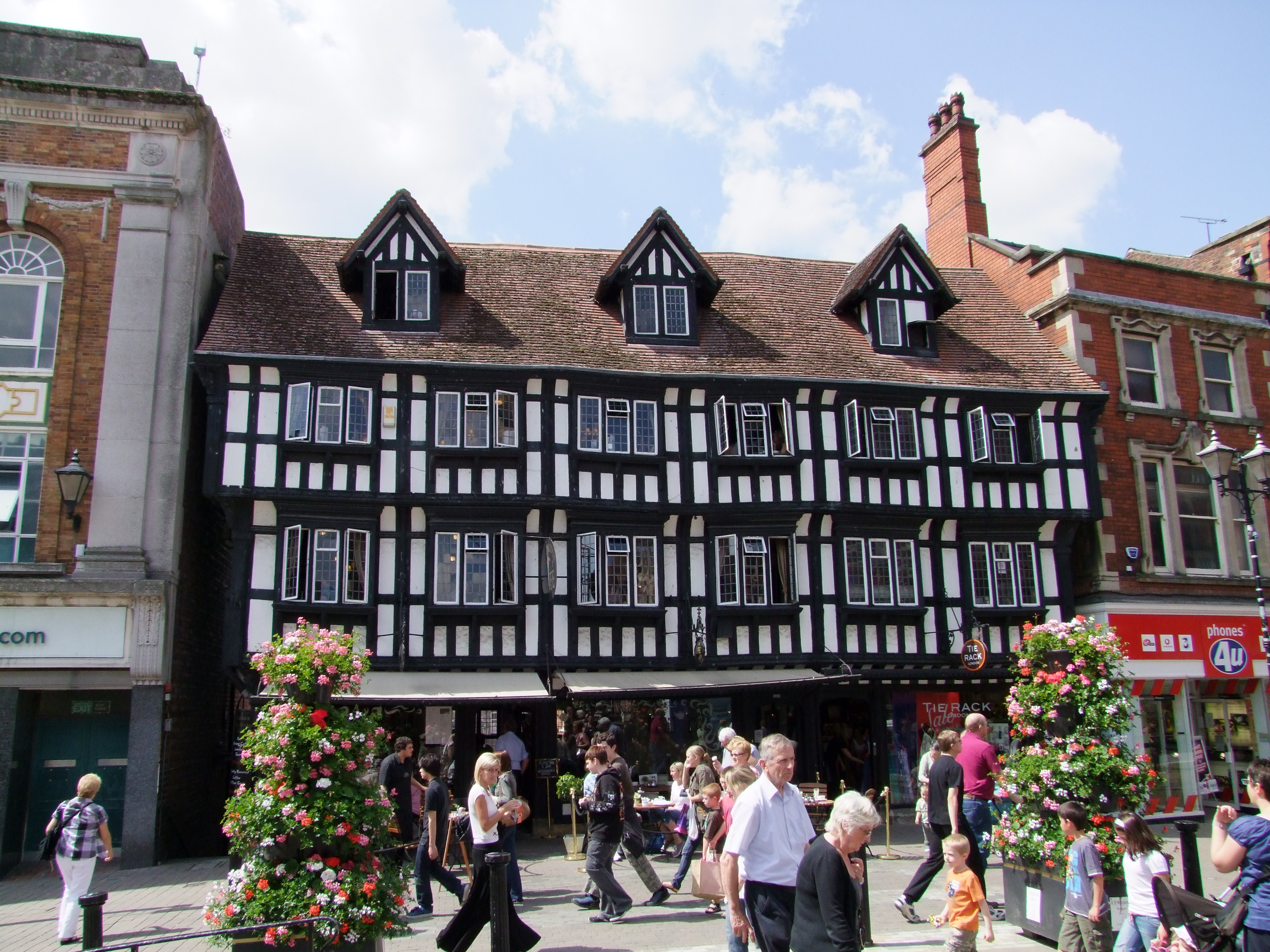
High Bridge on the High Street

Cornhill is the city's main market and transportation area. It has two squares, St Benedict's and Cornhill. Cornhill Square is anchored by the early-Victorian Corn Exchange Arcade and the late-Victorian Corn Exchange. St Benedict's is a Grade I listed former church (currently a book shop). The High Street then passes over St Mary's Street/Wigford Way where it passes through a level crossing with the railway station and directly next to the level crossing is St Mary le Wigford church which is a Grade I listed church and the oldest active parish church in the city centre.

=== South of the station ===
South of the railway station, at Tenercroft Street, the High Street opens up to cars with mixed use buildings on either side, The street runs southwards to St Catherines Roundabout and includes the former Lincoln St Marks Station, St Peter at Gowts Church, Central Methodist Church, Greek Orthodox Church of St. Basil and St. Paisios (Formerly St Botolph's Church until 2021) and St Mary's Guildhall among other historic buildings.

=== Brayford Pool ===
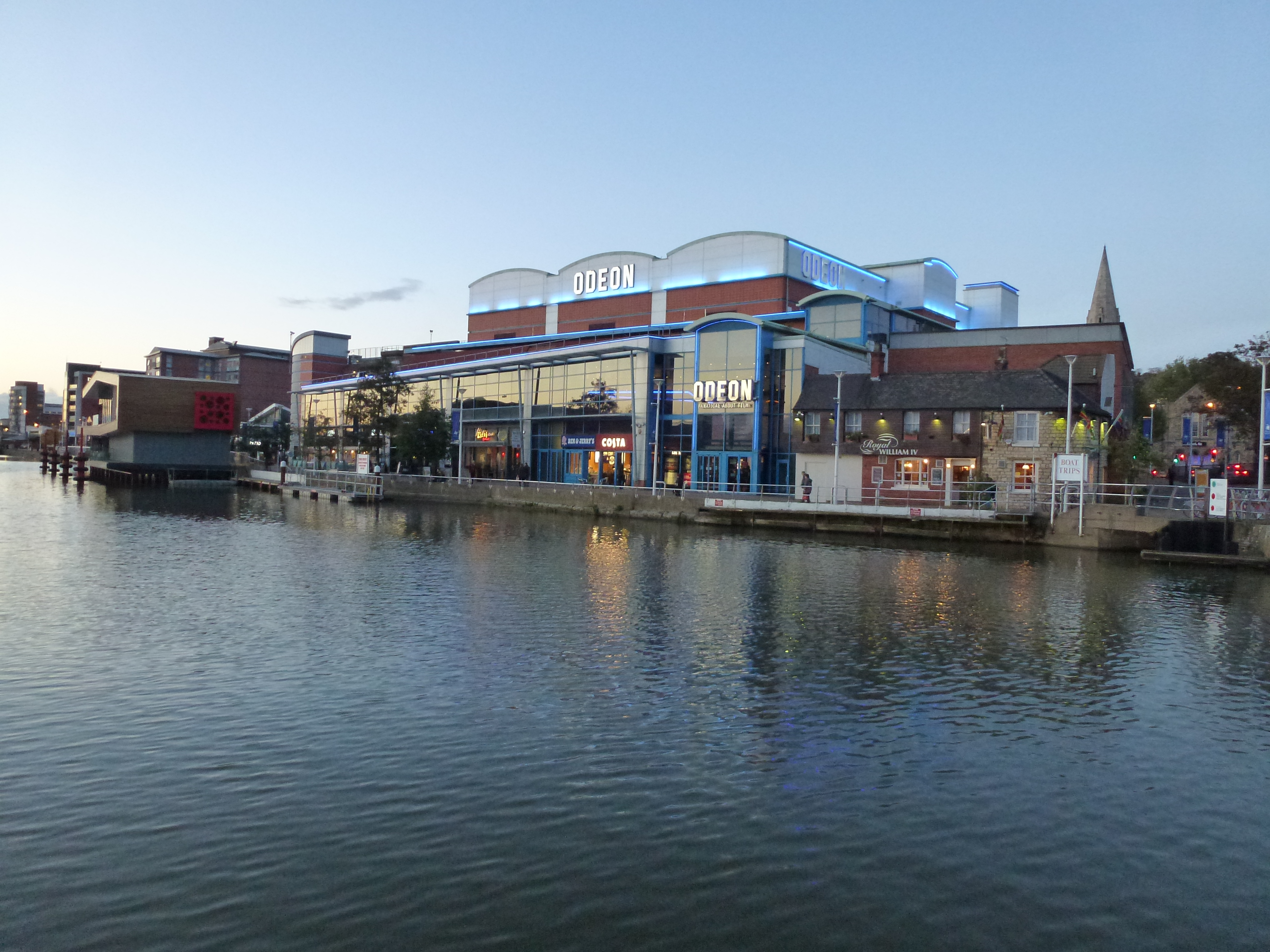
Looking north of Brayford Pool

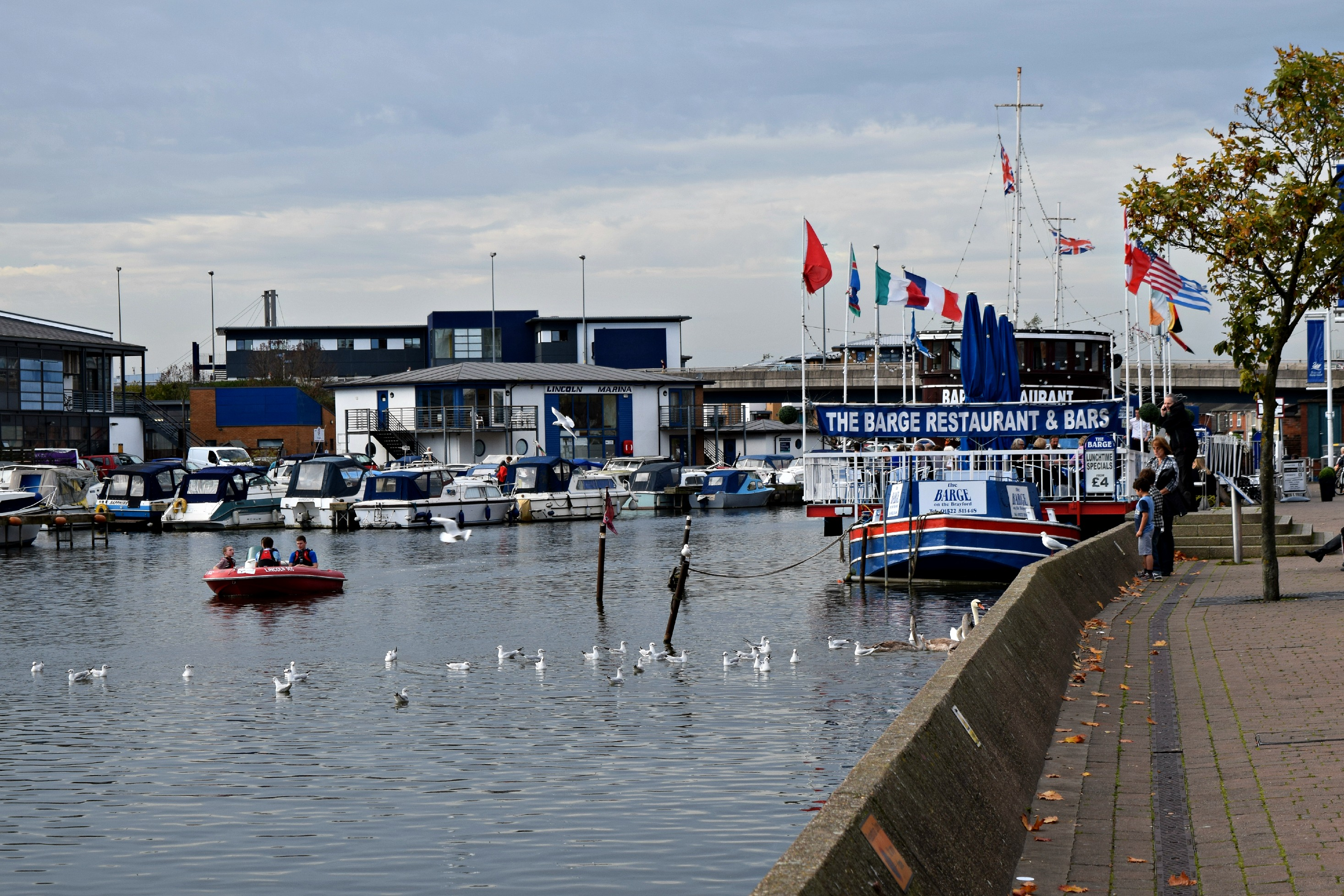
Looking east of Brayford Pool

North of Brayford Pool is Newland, it is the centre's area of governance. Lindsey County Council moved to the area in 1932 from the County Hall in Uphill to the Council Offices (Lindsey County Council became Lincolnshire County Council in 1974) with Lincoln City Council following by moving from the Guildhall in Downhill to the City Hall on Beaumont Fee in 1973. South and east of the pool is New Boultham, it includes the University of Lincoln's main campus and multiple retail parks.

== Places for culture ==
Lincoln city centre is home to many cultural buildings and venues such as Lincoln Central Library, New Theatre Royal Lincoln, Usher Art Gallery and the Engine Shed.

=== Gallery ===
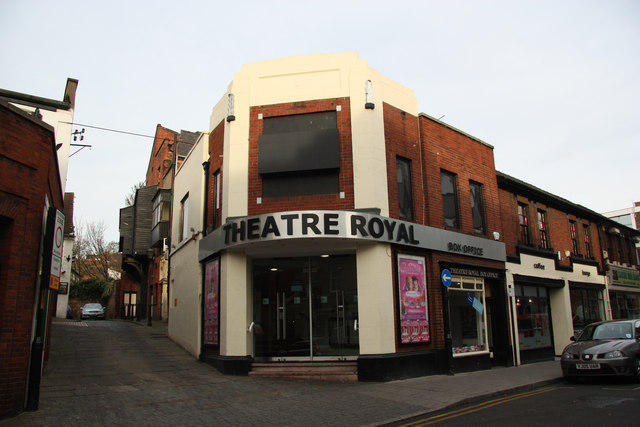
New Theatre Royal Lincoln

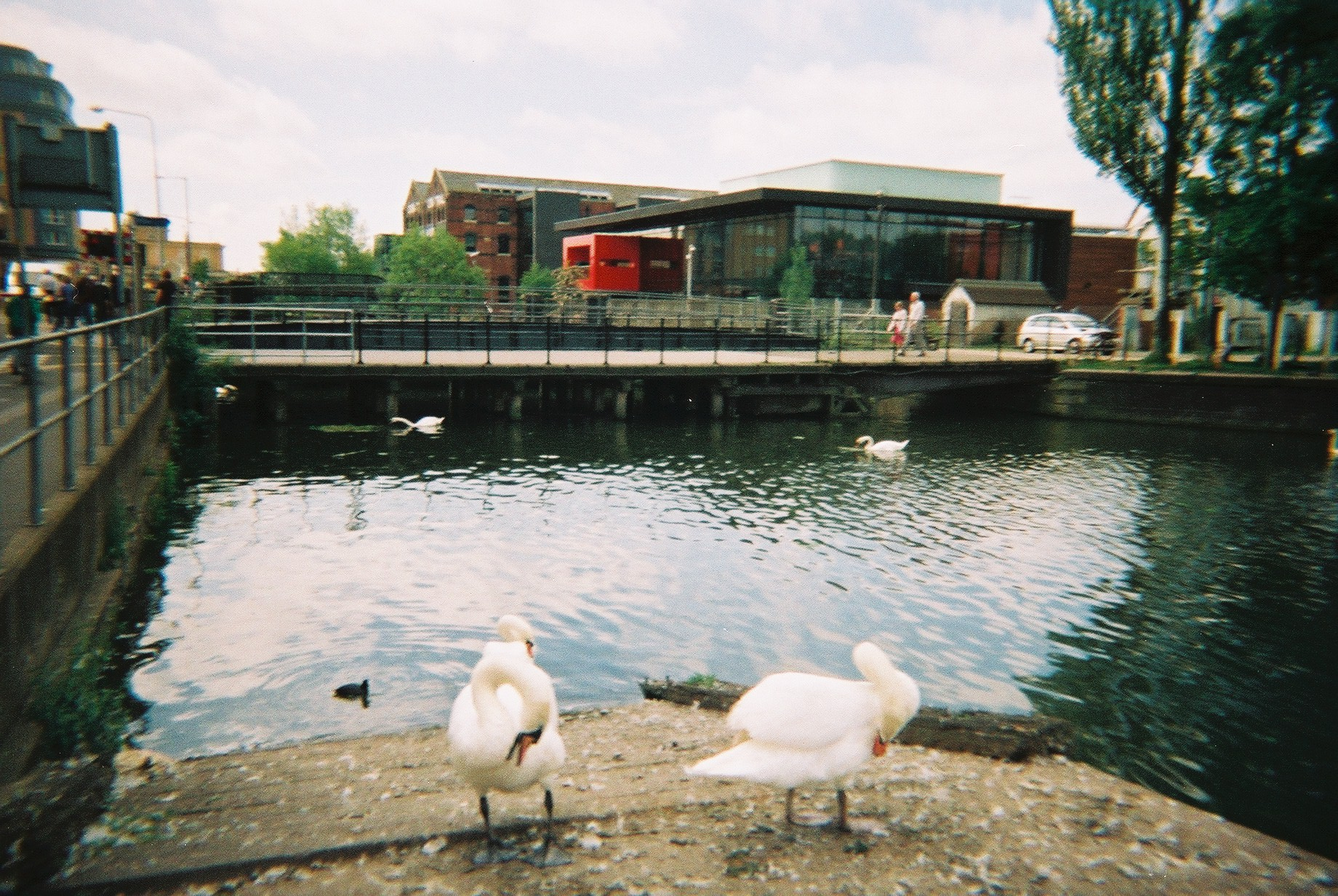
Engine Shed, Lincoln

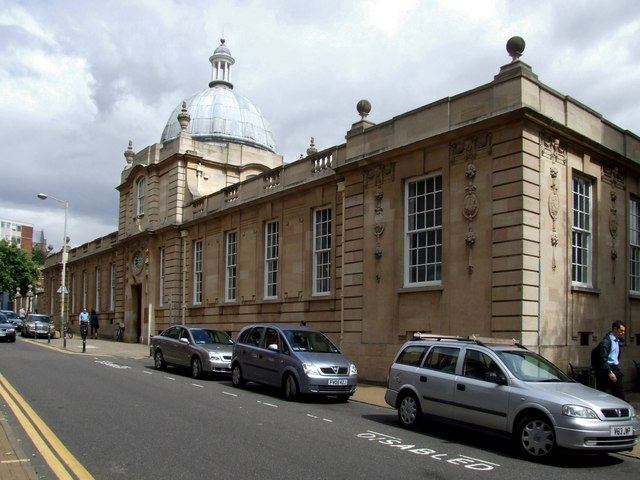
Lincoln Central Library

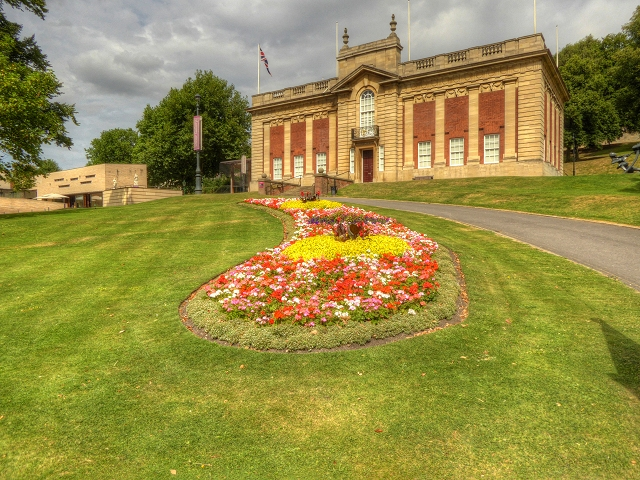
The Usher Art Gallery, Lincoln

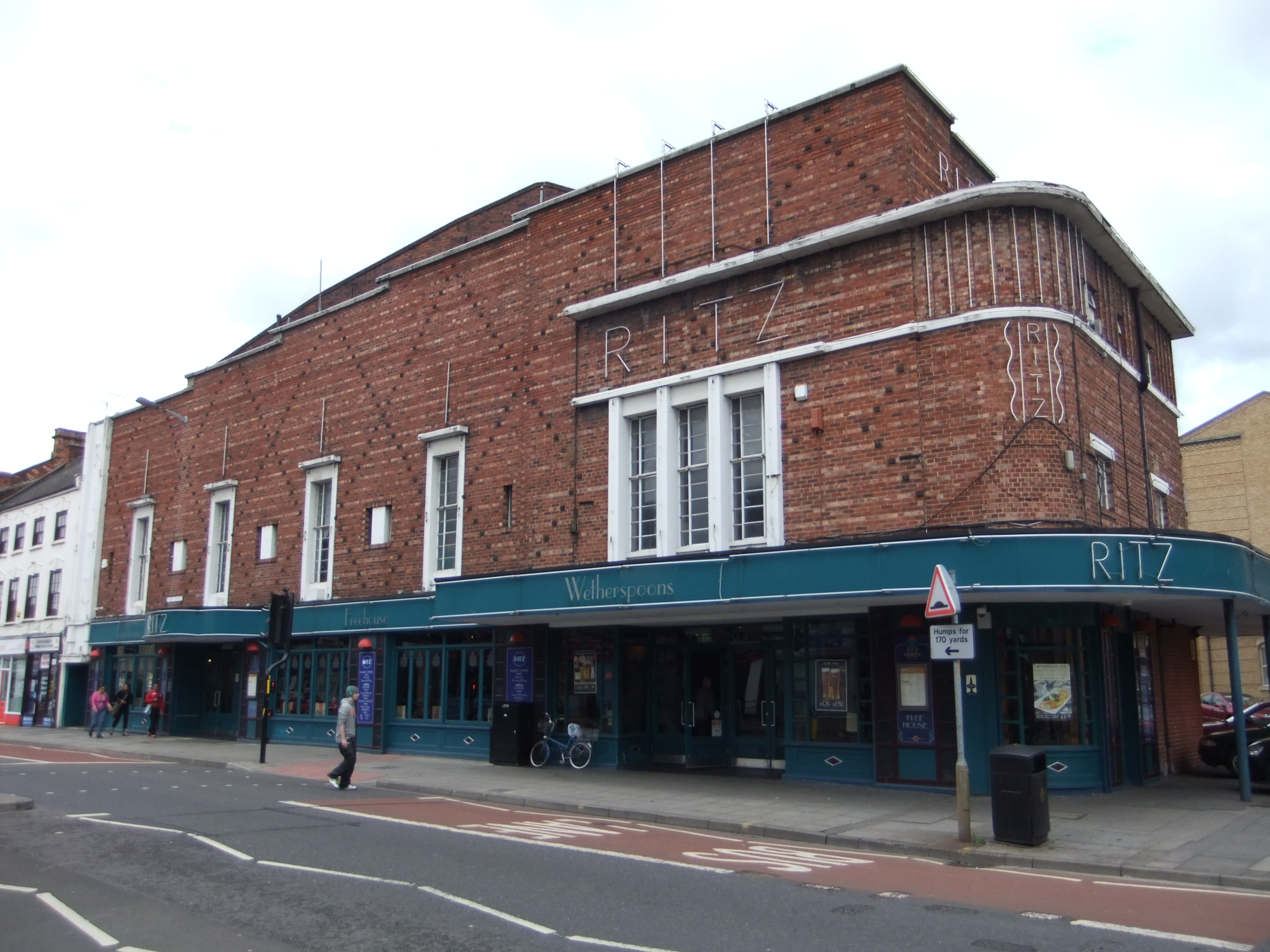
The Ritz, Lincoln

== Places of worship ==
The city centre is home to many active and former churches. Notable churches in the city centre include:

- St Swithin's Church, Lincoln
- Alive Church, Lincoln
- St Mary le Wigford
- St Peter at Gowts
- Central Methodist Church, Lincoln
- St Hugh's Church, Lincoln
- St Benedict's Church, Lincoln
- St Katherine's Church, Lincoln

It is also the site of a number of demolished medieval churches including: St Cuthbert's off Steep Hill; St George's, now the site of the Lincoln Museum; St Lawrence's; Holy Trinity in Clasketgate; St Edmund's; St Stephen-in-Newland; and All Saints in Hungate.

=== Gallery ===
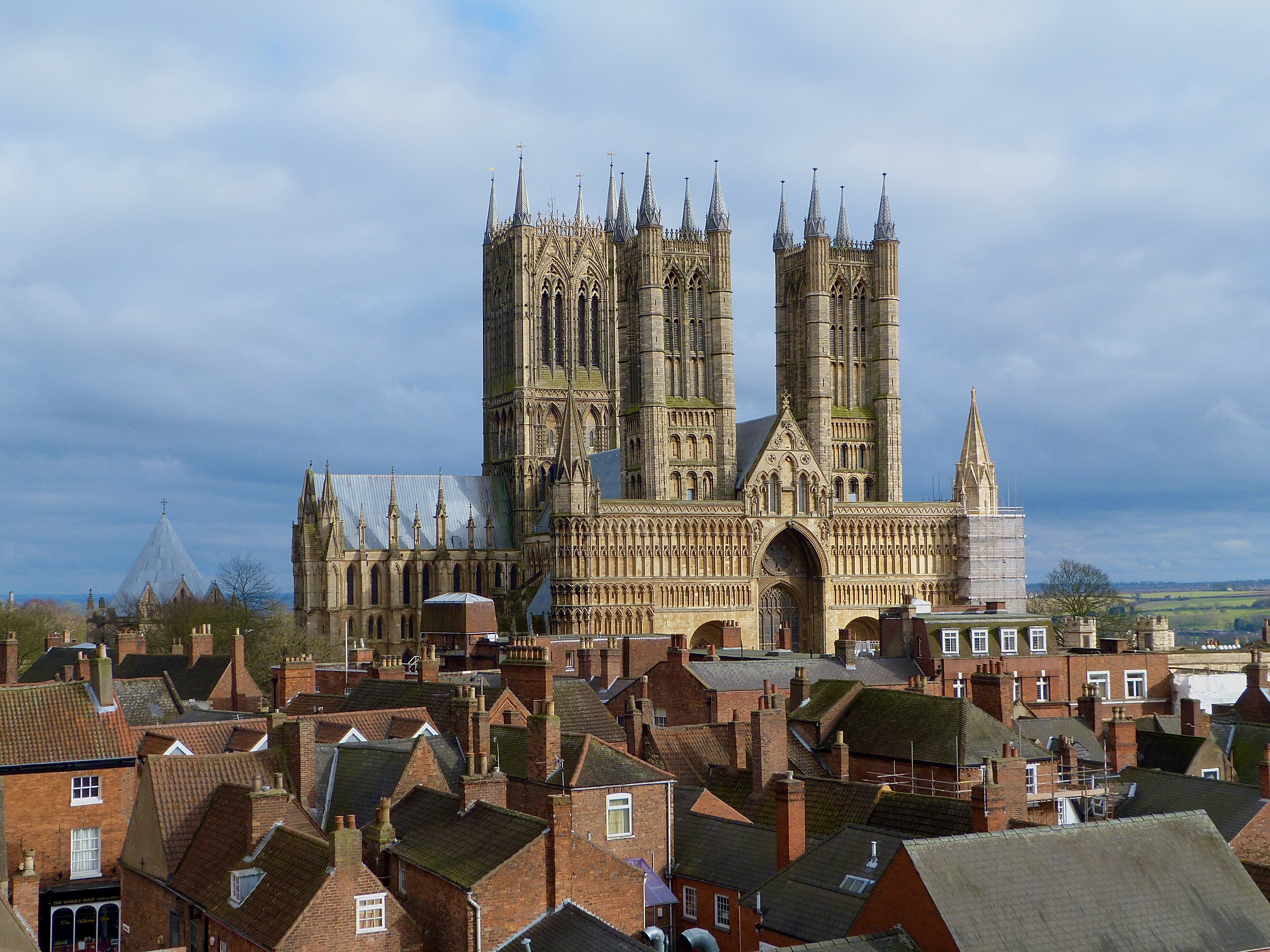
Lincoln Cathedral, the city's main landmark

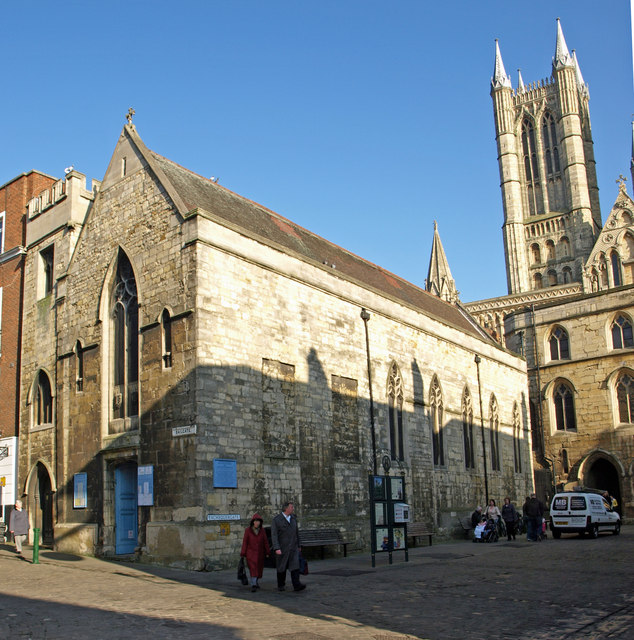
Church of St. Mary Magdalene

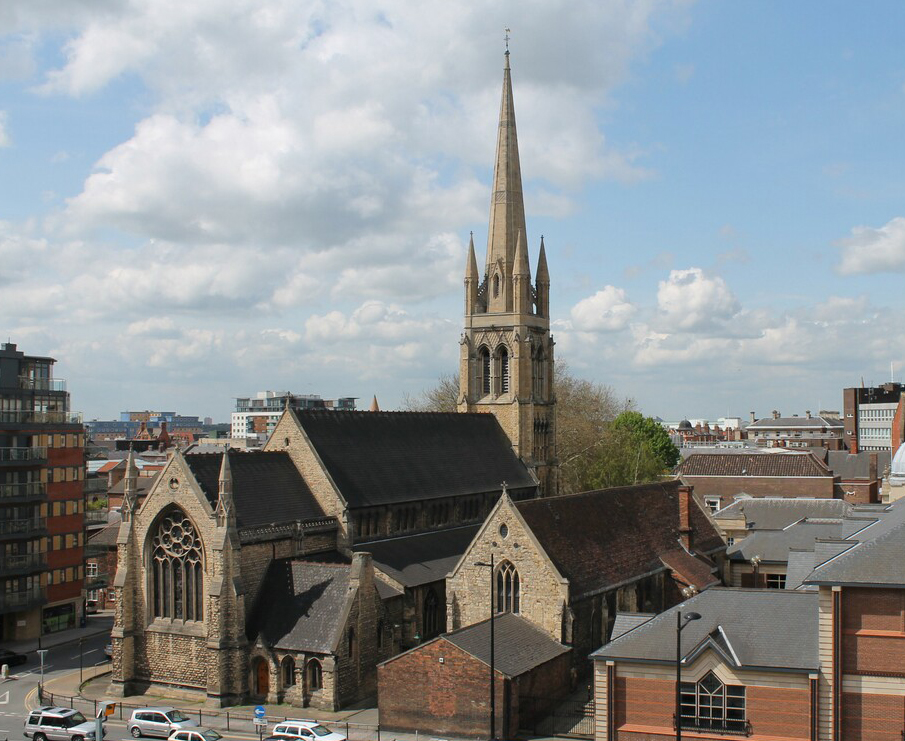
St Swithin's Church, still in use but the church remains closed while the congregation meet in an old nightclub

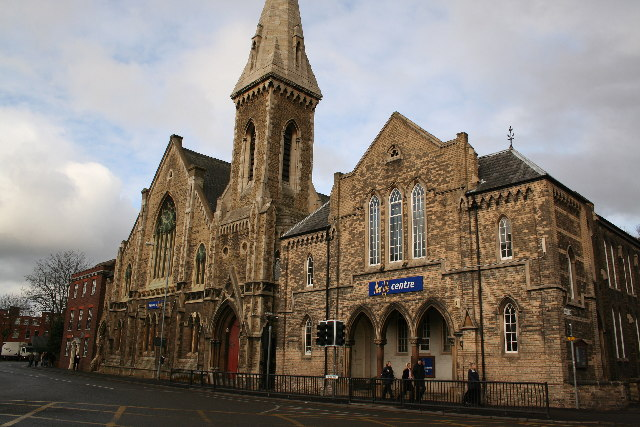
Alive Church, Lincoln near Brayford Pool

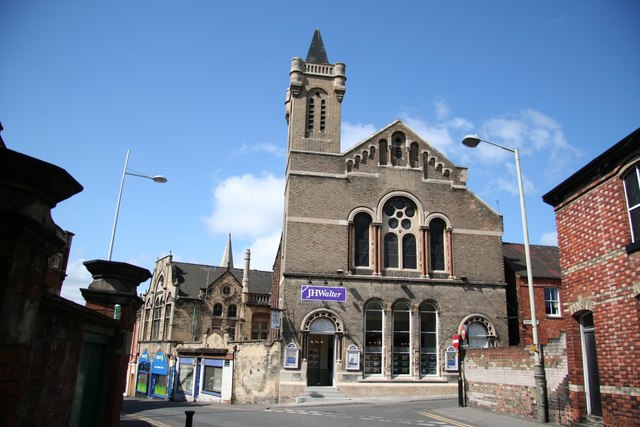
Former Baptist Chapel, Lincoln on Mint Lane, now an estate agents

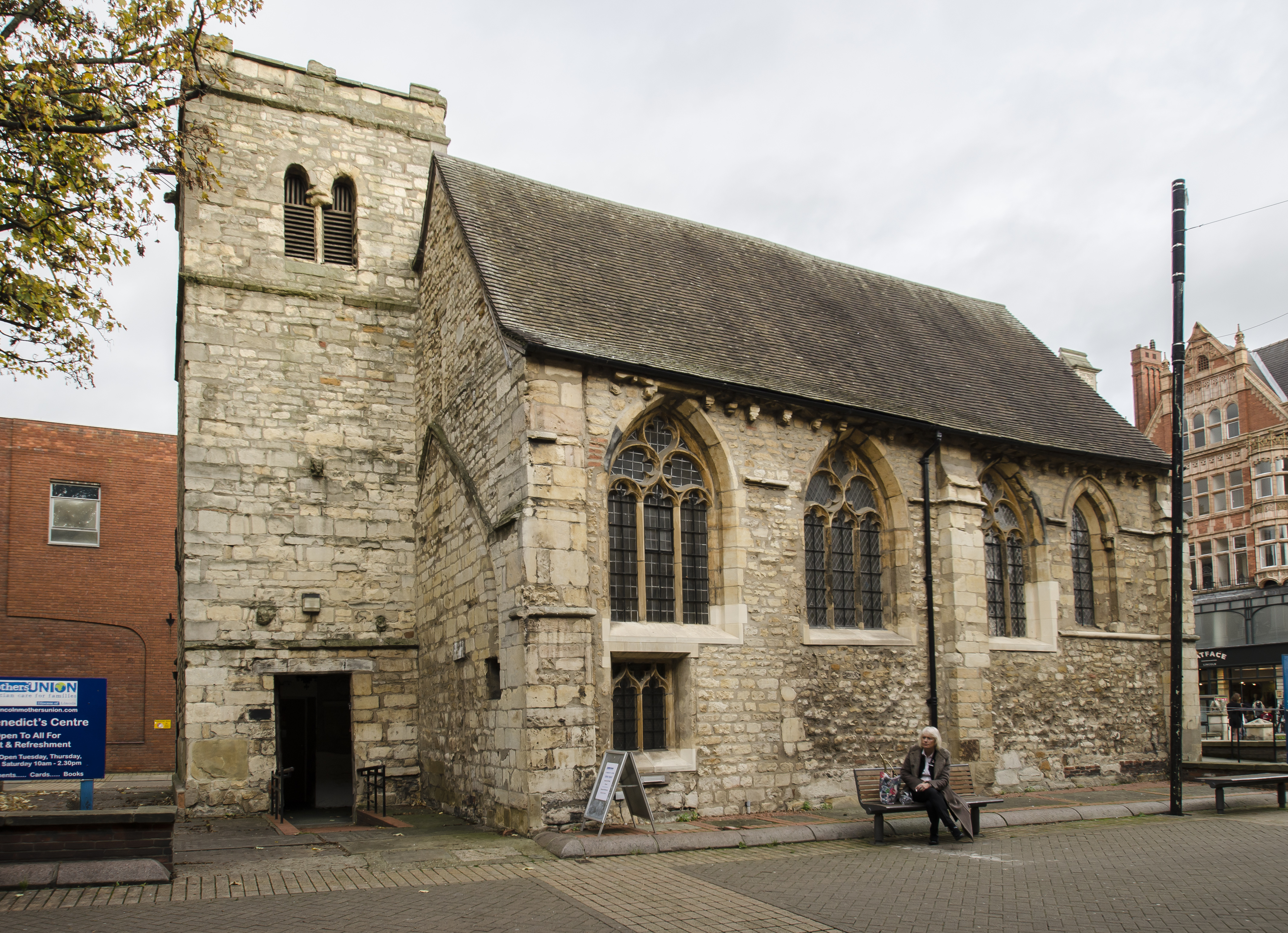
St Benedicts Church, now a bookshop in the city centre

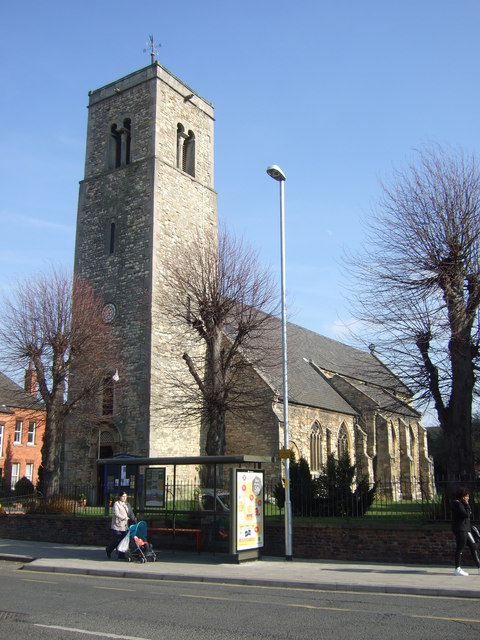
St Peter at Gowt Church, still an active church in the southern area of the city centre

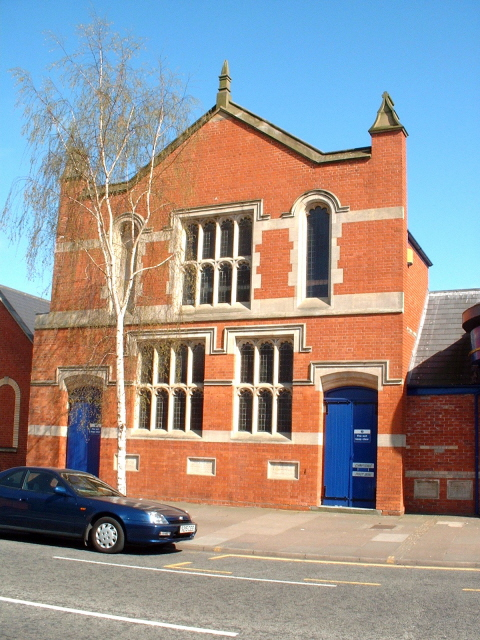
The former Congregationalist church on South Bar

== Places of recreation ==
Lincoln City Centre is on the northern and southern banks of the River Witham and it runs directly from the east of the city into Brayford Pool in the west of the city. Most of the river forms a small waterside plaza which runs along Waterside North and South to the City Square before it passes under High Bridge and under Wigford Way before merging into Brayford Pool and continuing west as Foss Dyke. The Foss Dyke then becomes a canal walk between Lincoln and Saxilby via Burton Waters and Skellingthorpe. Parks and gardens in and around the city centre include Temple Gardens, South Commons, West Common and Lincoln Arboretum. Brayford Pool near the university offers a wide range of boating activities, coffee houses and bars as well as a cinema. The city is also home to many nightclubs and bars. Most notable is the Engine Shed which hosts many events and is the largest events venue in the city centre.

== Transport ==
Lincoln city centre is pedestrianised and surrounded by through routes, Wigford Way, Tritton Road, Melville Street and Monks Road. Most traffic around the city centre uses the A46 and Lincoln Eastern Bypass.

Lincoln railway station is operated by East Midlands Railway but is served by other train operators including London North Eastern Railway and Northern Trains. The station is adjacent to Lincoln Transport Hub.

Lincoln offers park and ride for residents and tourists to go up and down Steep Hill, the castle and cathedral and different parts of the city centre. This service is a sight-seeing bus service. A walk and ride shuttle bus service allows walkers to board and alight whenever they wish to around the city centre.

Lincoln currently has a cycling scheme with bikes available for hire through the HireBike scheme by Lincolnshire County Council. However in 2022, this was in the process of being scrapped in favour of a new scheme and could include e-bikes.

== Education ==
The University of Lincoln campus is alongside Brayford Pool and the River Witham. A branch of Access Creative College is on Claskengate near the High Street, and Lincoln College is on Monks Road. The city centre also has two schools, Lincoln Minster School (east of the cathedral) and St Faith and St Martin Church of England Junior School on Hampton Street.

=== Gallery ===
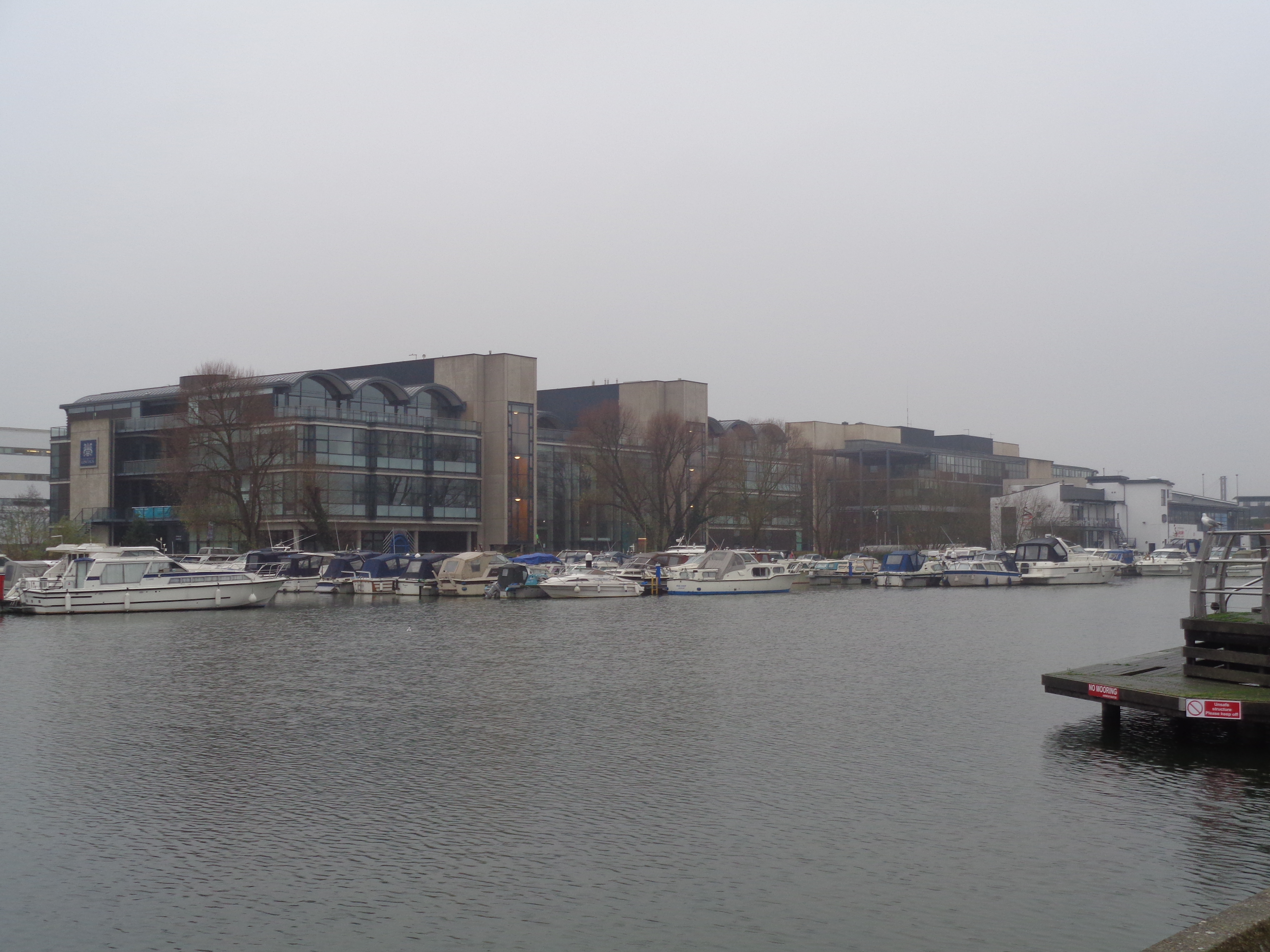
University of Lincoln from Brayford Pool

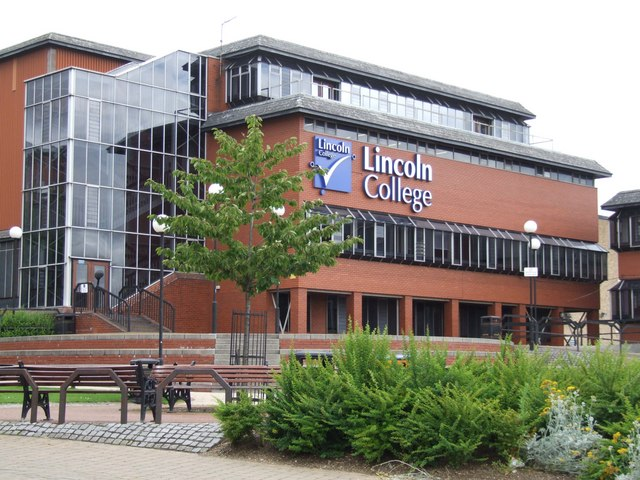
Lincoln College

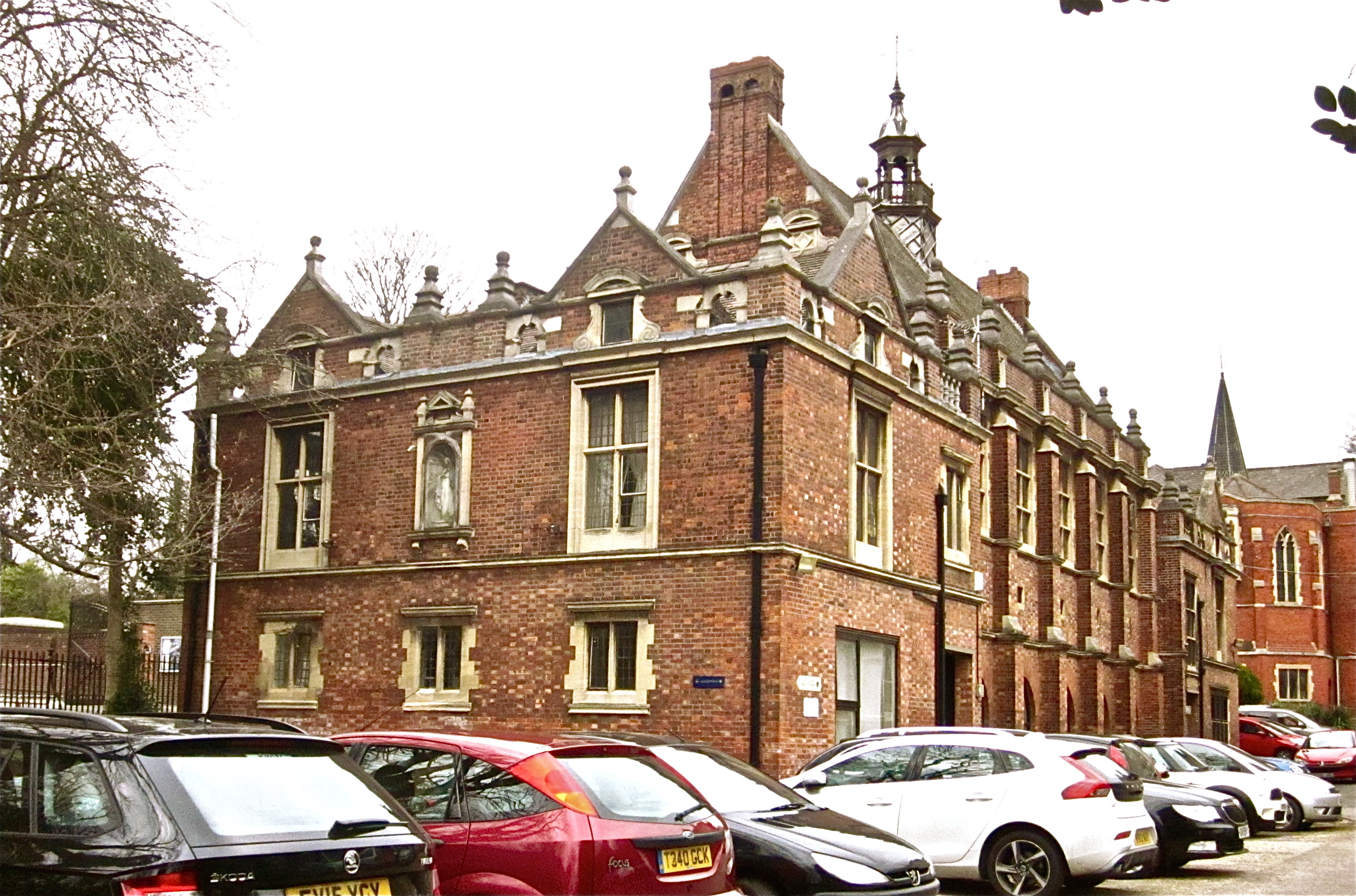
Lincoln Minster School
