= High Street, Lincoln =

Street in Lincoln, Lincolnshire, England

High Street
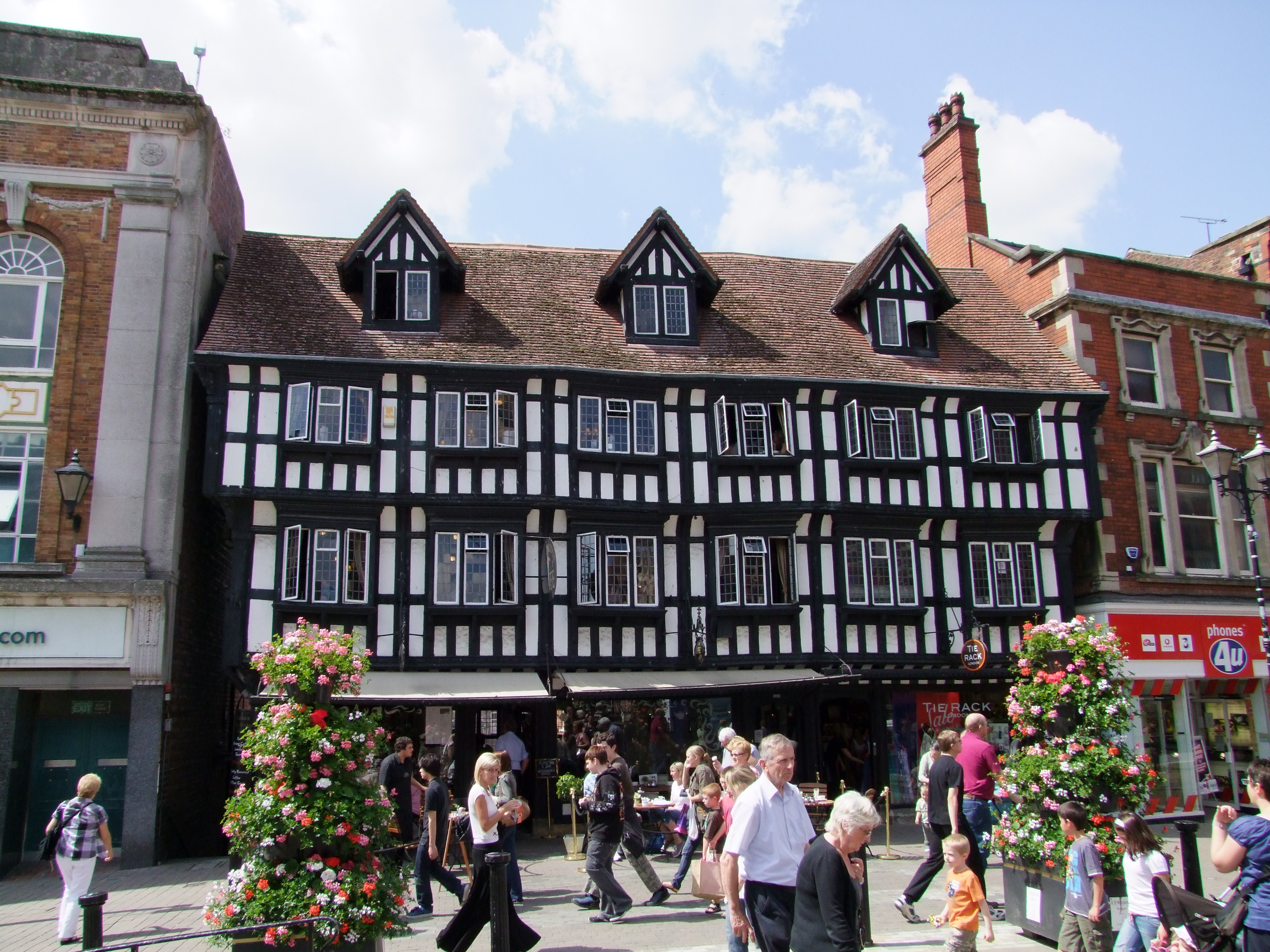
- High Bridge on the High Street
- Interactive map of High Street
- Former name(s): Ermine Street, Iter VI of the Antonine Itinerary
- Maintained by: Lincolnshire County Council
- Length: 1.9 km (1.2 mi)
- Addresses: 1–480
- Location: Lincoln, England
- Postal code: LN5 7DW
- Coordinates: 53°13′36″N 0°32′29″W
- Northern end: The Strait, Motherby Lane; 53°13′53″N 0°32′22″W
- Major junctions: Clasketgate, Mint Street, Saltergate, St Mary's Street, Railway Line
- Southern end: St Catherine Roundabout (A1434); 53°12′53″N 0°32′46″W

Construction
- Commissioned: Roman

High Street in Lincoln, Lincolnshire, England extends from the St Catherine's roundabout and ends approximately 1.2 miles further north at The Strait. The historic High Street has evolved through many changes over its 2000 year history, encompassing Roman roads and settlement, medieval buildings, markets, places of worship, civic buildings, bridges, the arrival of the railways and heavy industry.

The greatest concentration of listed buildings is north of the railway station in the pedestrianised area where most of the city's commercial, retail and cultural areas are located. South of the railway station there are fewer listed buildings the street is a busy urban road numbered the B1262.

== History ==
High Street in Lincoln follows the route of Ermine Street, a major Roman road that linked London (Londinium) to Lincoln (Lindum Colonia) and onwards to the Humber. Ermine Street was built between 60 and 90 AD. It was joined south of Lincoln by the Fosse Way. The Roman road passed through low-lying wetland by the River Witham on a causeway. The river flowed north to Brayford Pool, parallel to the west of the street, before turning east to be crossed at an important crossing, now the medieval High Bridge. In Roman times the river was much wider and was important for trade.

The city declined after the Romans left but the High Street kept roughly to the Roman line and developed between 1000 and 1300 AD when it was built on both sides as far as Wigford. Streets including Garmston Street, Silver Street, Swan Street and Flaxengate were developed at this time and land behind the houses on both sides of High Street was divided into long narrow burgage plots. From the 11th century Wigford developed as a suburb for "substantial elite residences" with six parish churches, of which two survive, and stretched from High Bridge to the Sincil Dyke.

In the 16th and 17th centuries new houses and commercial properties were built with timber frames including those on High Bridge. The markets moved south from the slope onto High Street. During the Industrial Revolution, heavy industry attracted a growth in population. Inns and hotels were built for visitors and locals and places of worship were built for non-conformists. The railway arrived in 1846 when the Midland Railway opened Lincoln station. It was renamed Lincoln St Marks in 1950, closed in 1985, and redeveloped as a shopping centre. It was followed by the Great Northern in 1848.

The character of High Street, the main retail spine of the city, changes from small independent shops to national retailers further down the hill. A clear change occurs after it passes the railway level crossing at St Mary’s Street and leaves the city centre. Here, on the flat area, large scale development took place during the industrial revolution, streets of terraced housing for workers join at right angles, giving the southern part of High Street a different character. In 2021 the city council and English Heritage funded a Heritage Action Zone to run up to 2024 for parts of the lower High Street with the aim of revitalising an area that had become tired and run down. It involved restoring heritage buildings and renewing shop fronts to future proof them, attract more businesses and showcase its interesting history.

== Landmarks and listed buildings ==
Looking to the north, High Street is dominated by Lincoln Cathedral, which is prominently placed in "Uphill" Lincoln. While today that area is noted for the castle and many fine medieval and later buildings, the High Street in "Downhill" has many important buildings scattered in amongst the more recent shopping developments. During the construction of the former Boots the Chemist on the eastern side of the High Street at its junction with Clasketgate in 1924, the remains of a Roman building, now a scheduled monument, were uncovered including a hypocaust, which is on display in the basement. More than 30 listed buildings are adjacent to or face onto the High Street. The Guildhall and Stonebow, St Mary le Wigford and St Mary's Guildhall are Grade I listed buildings. The St Peter at Gowt's conservation area, towards the southern end of High Street, was designated in 1975.

The Stonebow and Guildhall is Lincoln's town gate with a guildhall above, dating from the 15th century and restored in 1885-87. The figures in the niches are (left) the Archangel Gabriel and (right) the Virgin Mary, patron saint of the city and cathedral. In the centre is the royal coat of arms of James I, dated 1605. It replaced an earlier gate, possibly Norman, but conceivably the south gate of the Roman city.

St Mary le Wigford Church is next to the railway crossing signalbox. Further south is St Peter at Gowts, an 11th-century church built by the Great Gowt Drain. Close to it is St Mary's Guildhall, once known as John o'Gaunt's Stables. Built around 1157, it was possibly the town house of Henry II. It was used as a guildhall for nearly three hundred years until 1547. In the early 17th century it was used as a school and part was let out for maltings. It was restored between 1984 and 1986 and houses the Lincoln Civic Trust and St Peter at Gowt's church hall. At the southern end of the street is St Botolph's Church, the oldest part is its west tower of 1721.

Two contrasting places of worship, almost opposite each other on the lower High Street are the plain Unitarian Chapel of 1725, and the more flamboyant Central Methodist Church of 1905.

== Gallery ==
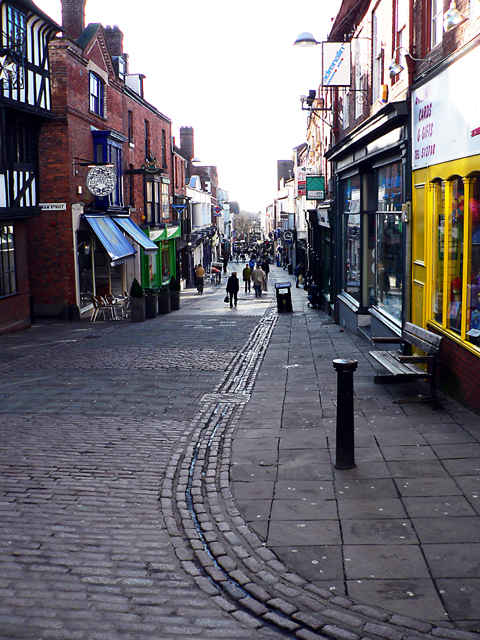
Northern end, pedestrianised

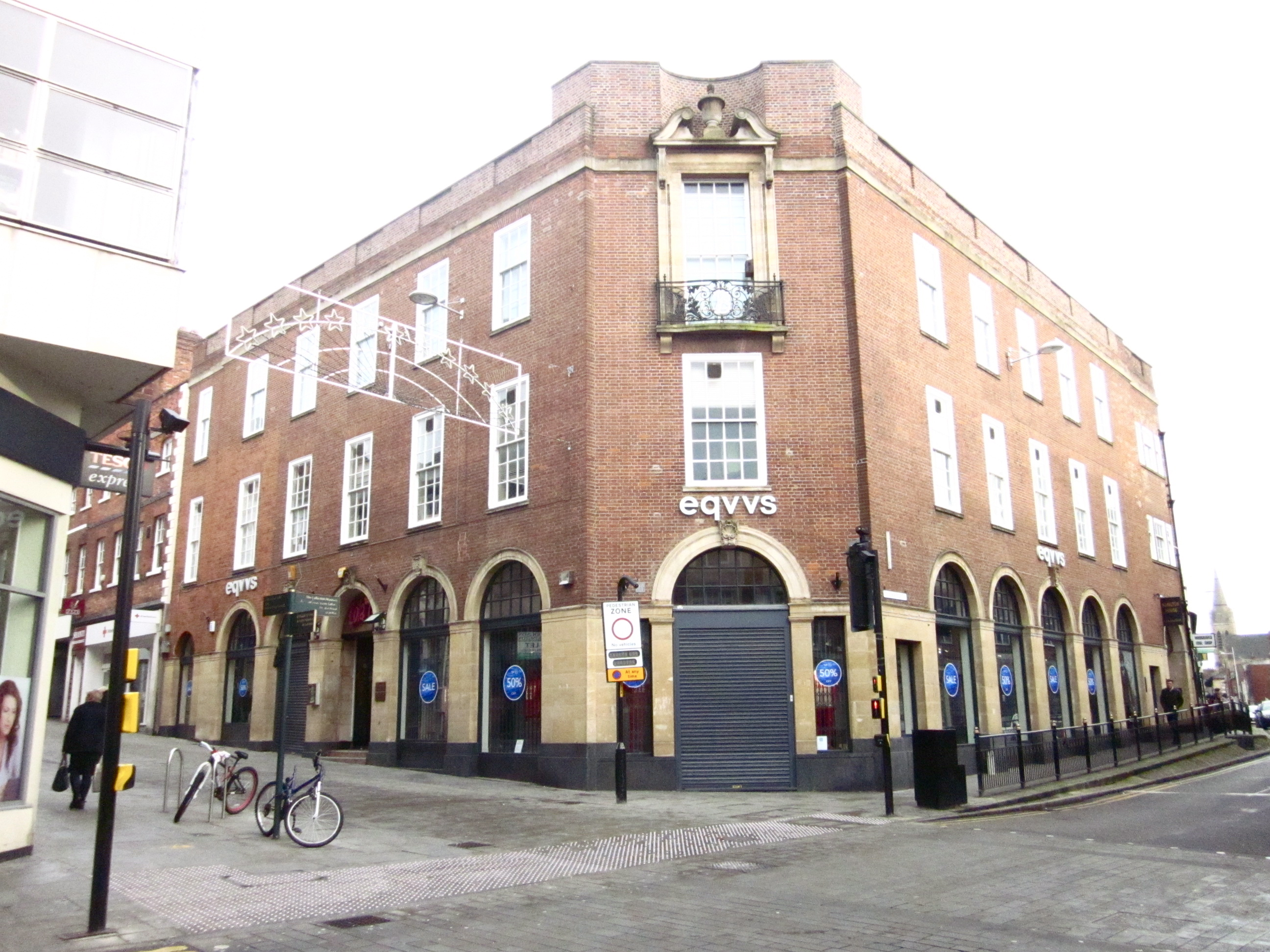
Former Boots the Chemist shop

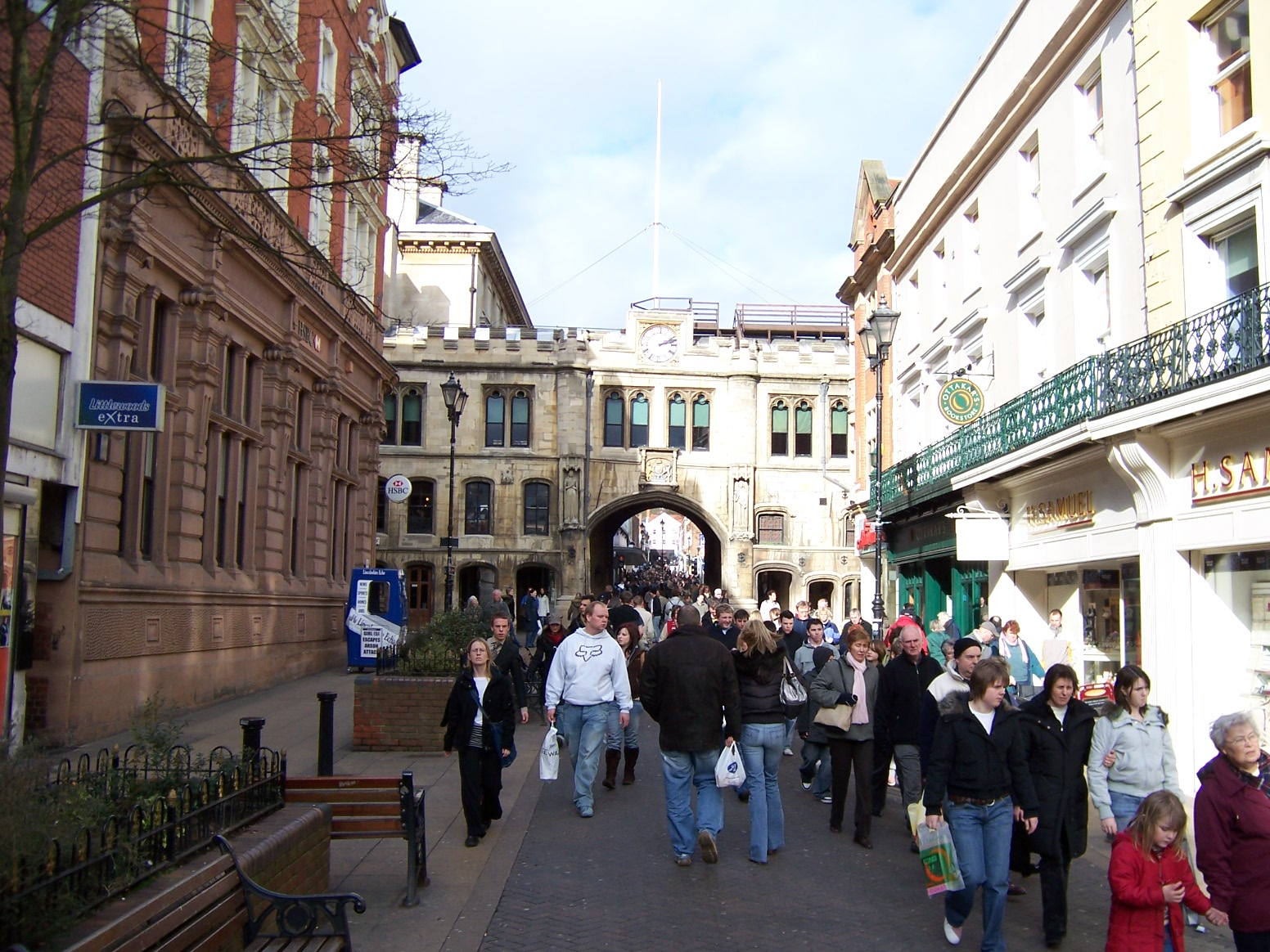
The High Street passes under the Stonebow and Guildhall

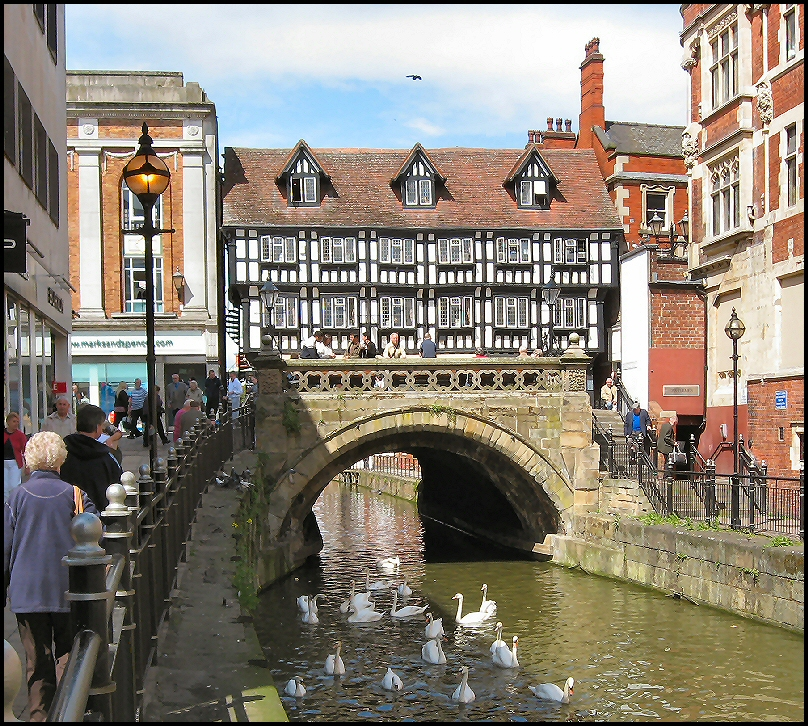
High Bridge over the River Witham

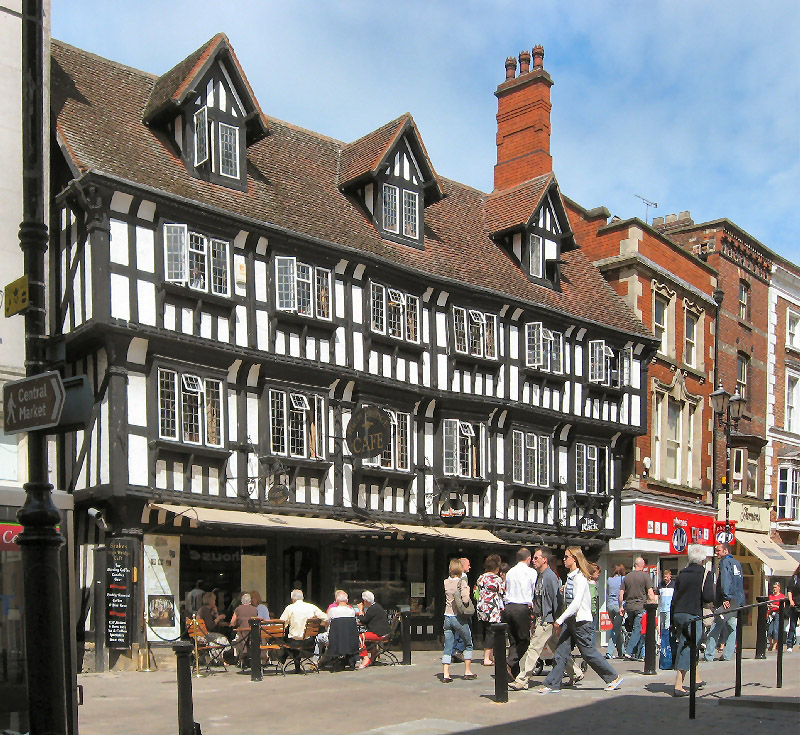
'Stokes' Coffee Shop on High Bridge

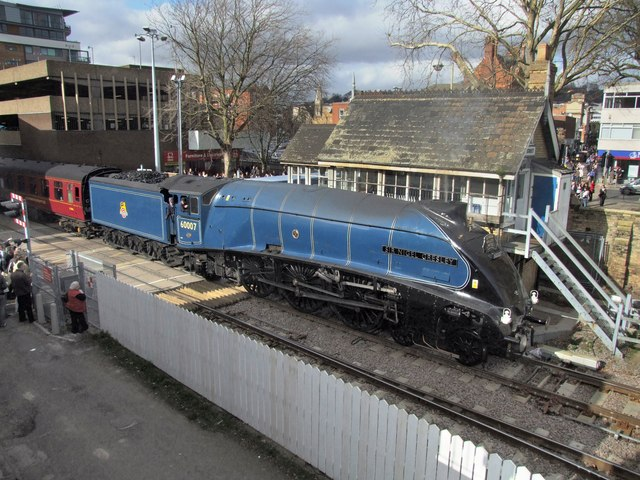
Sir Nigel Gresley takes a railtour across the High Street

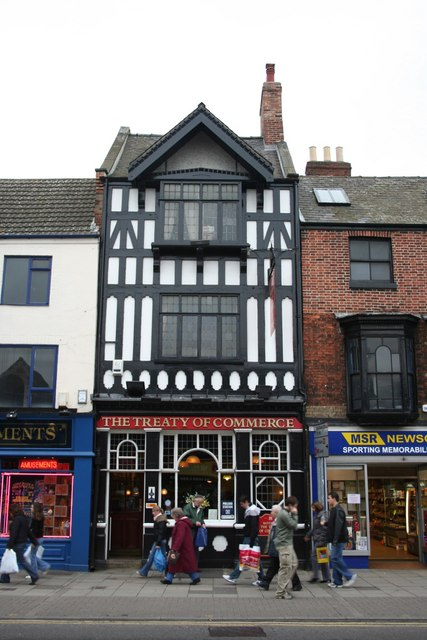
'The Treaty of Commerce' a Victorian black and white pub, by the level crossing

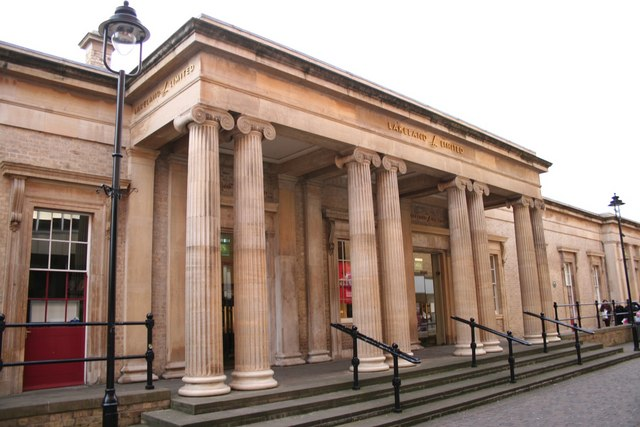
St Marks station is now part of the St Mark's Square shopping centre

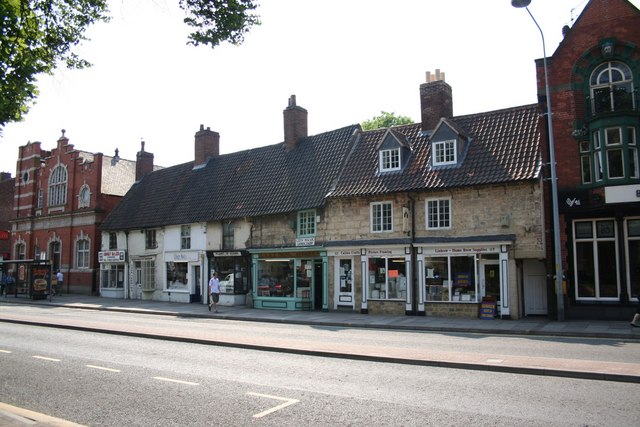
St Andrews Row 15- 17th-century cottages used as shops

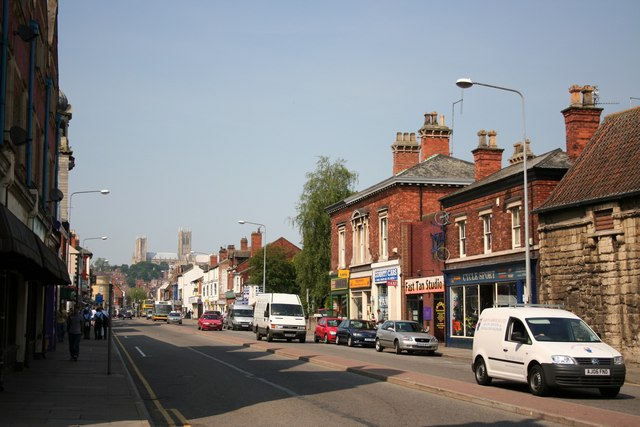
Southern end, open to motor traffic and designated B1262

== Paintings ==
Historic paintings and drawings give a good idea how buildings and the streetscapes have changed over the years. Two paintings in Lincoln's Usher Gallery demonstrate the changes that have taken place. Both paintings were made from approximately the same position, close to the Church of St Mary le Wigford. The earliest, which may date from around 1800 by Henry Hall, shows the cobbled streets lined with buildings of the Georgian period, most of which have now disappeared. In the distance is the obelisk shaped water conduit that was placed on the High Bridge over the River Witham to supply the street with water. Beyond this and below the cathedral is the tower of St Peter at Arches, which was demolished in 1932 to make way for new shops. Some fifty years later the sporting artist John E. Ferneley I shows the change brought about by the coming of the railway, with a level crossing cutting across the street. Many Georgian buildings are still there and the lower water conduit at St Mary le Wigford is shown on the right.

Another watercolour view of the High Street around 1820 is by the artist and architect Ambrose Poynter. This is viewed from the south end of the street, fairly close to the Great Bargate (demolished ic.1759) This watercolour is viewed from the south end of the street, looking north towards Lincoln Cathedral. It appears to show St Peter at Gowt's Church on the right hand side and the Little Gowt Drain that crossed the High Street just below the church. The other buildings shown all appear to have been demolished.

Historic images of High Street

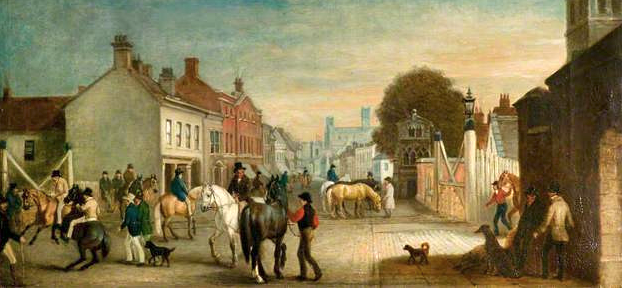
Lincoln High Street, two years after the coming of the railways in 1848 by John E. Ferneley

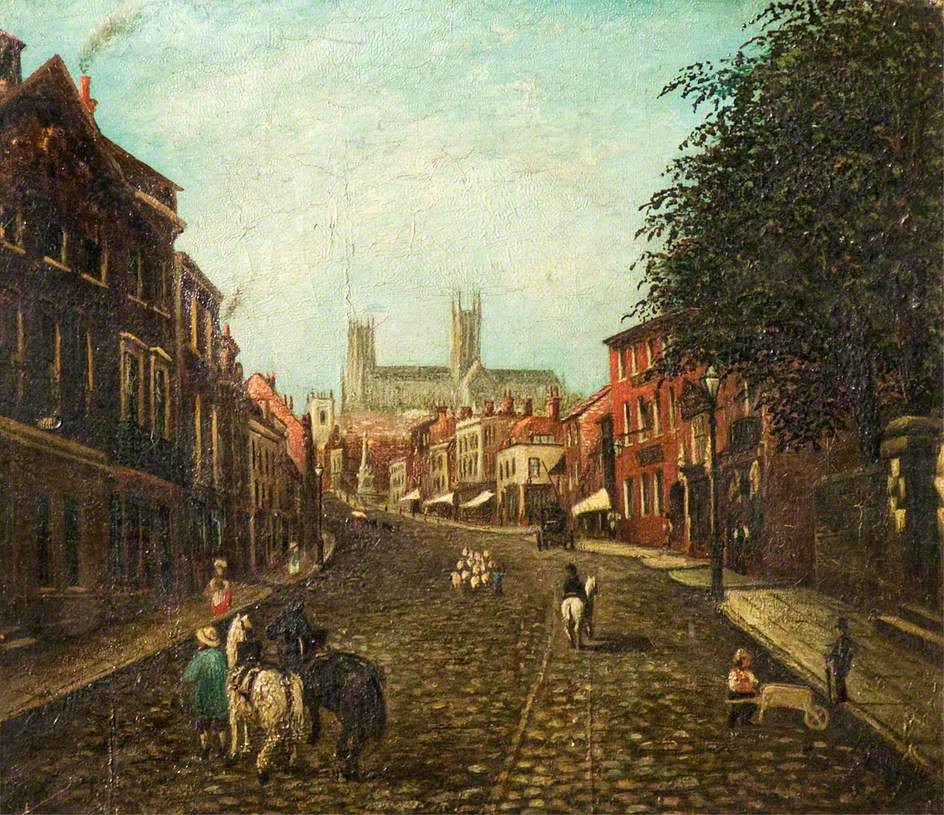
High Street, Lincoln c.1800 by Henry Hall

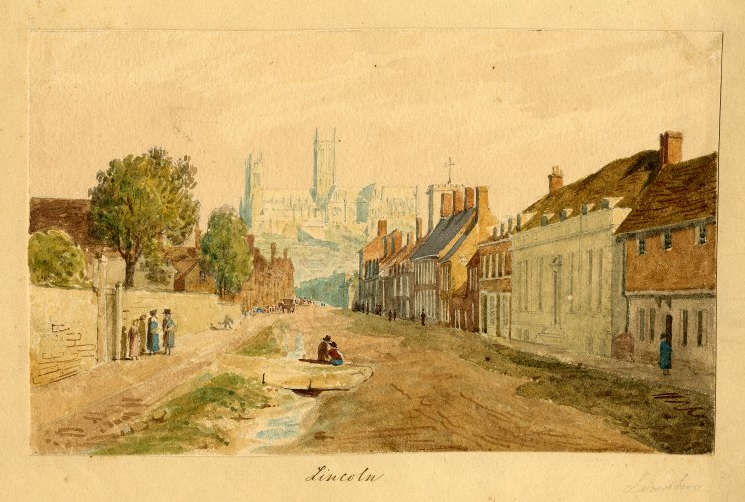
Lincoln High Street c.1820 by Ambrose Poynter

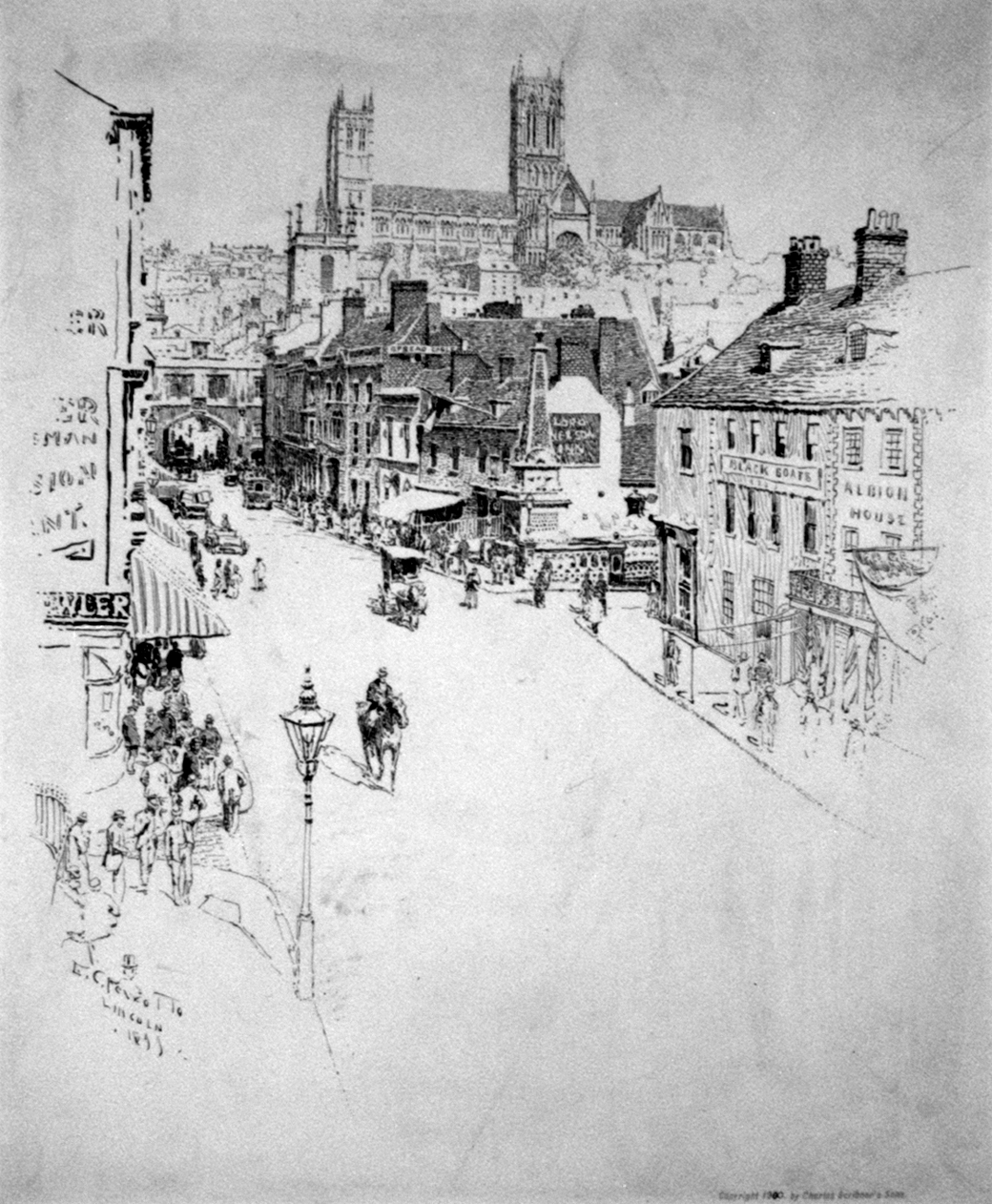
The High Street in 1899

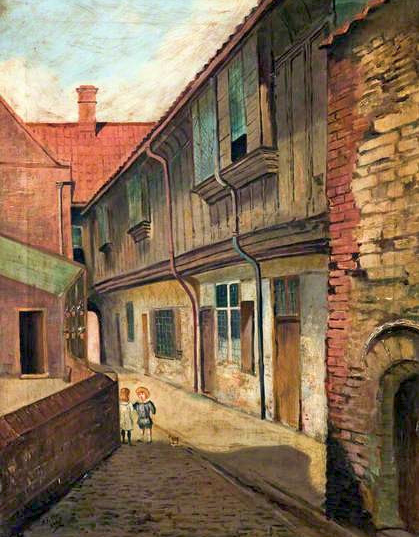
Akrill's Passage, Lincoln by Alfred Ernest White

== Numbering ==
The numbering of premises is consecutive, which is unusual compared with most of the country. Number 1, High Street, starts with the first building on the western side at the southern end of the street, the neighbouring property is Number 2, followed by Number 3 and so on. This pattern continues northwards, uphill until the High Street meets The Strait. The sequential numbering system then continues southward, down the High Street on the eastern side, until reaching Number 471-480, opposite number 1.

== See also ==
- Lincoln City Centre
- Steep Hill
- Lincoln St Marks railway station

== Literature ==
- Antram N. (revised), Pevsner N. & Harris J., (1989), The Buildings of England: Lincolnshire, Yale University Press.
- Stearne K. (ed), (2001), The Archaeology of Wigford and Brayford Pool, Lincoln Archaeological Studies No.2, Oxbow Books, Oxford ISBN 184217021X
