= Lincoln Unitarian Chapel =

Church in Lincoln, England

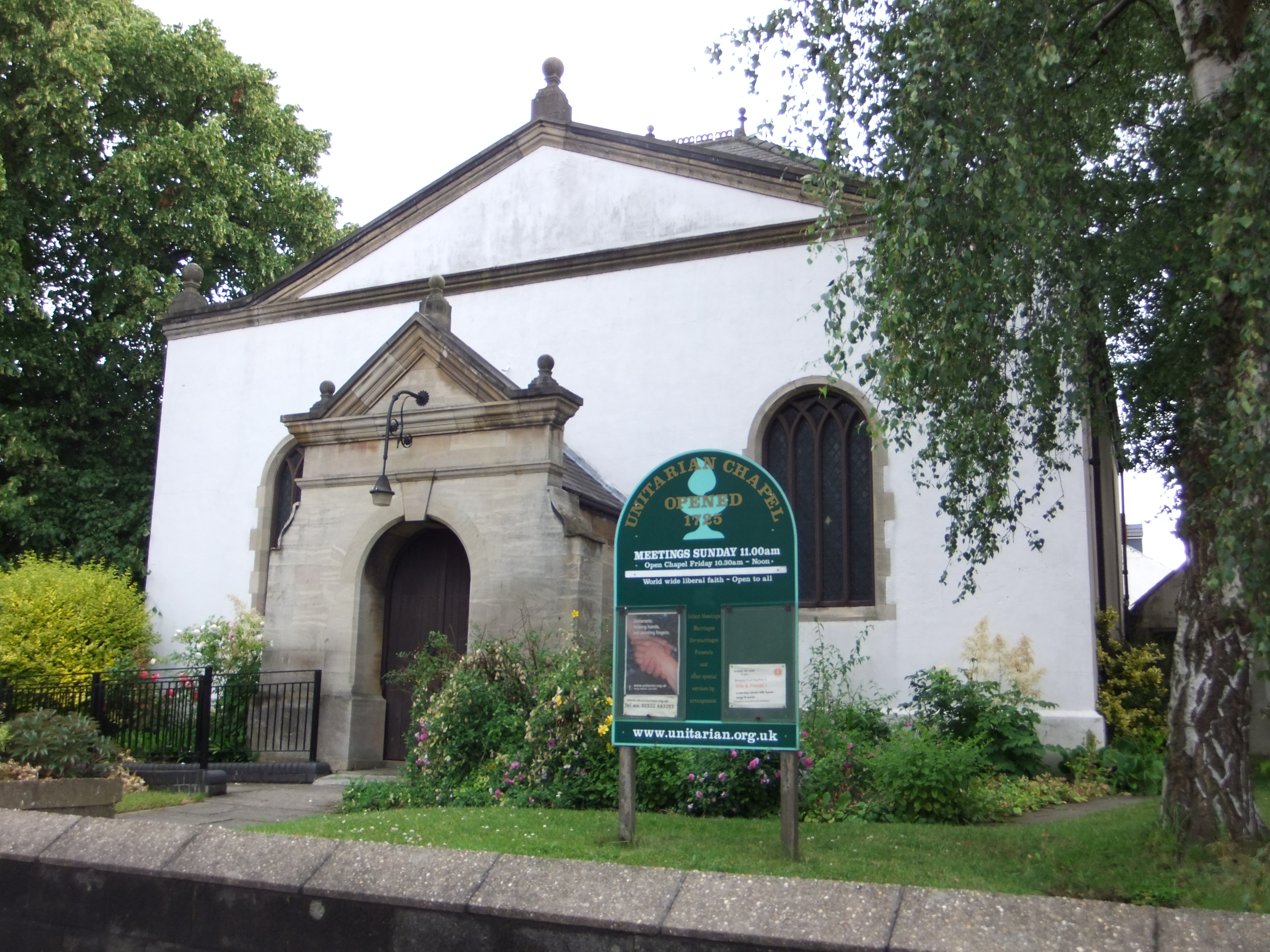
- Lincoln Unitarian Chapel, Lincoln
- Lincoln Unitarian Chapel
- 53.2228°N 0.5435°W
- OS grid reference: SK 97340 70518
- Location: High Street, Lincoln, Lincolnshire
- Country: England
- Denomination: Unitarian
- Website: lincolnunitarians.org.uk

History
- Status: Active
- Founded: 1725

Architecture
- Heritage designation: Grade II
- Designated: 15 August 1973

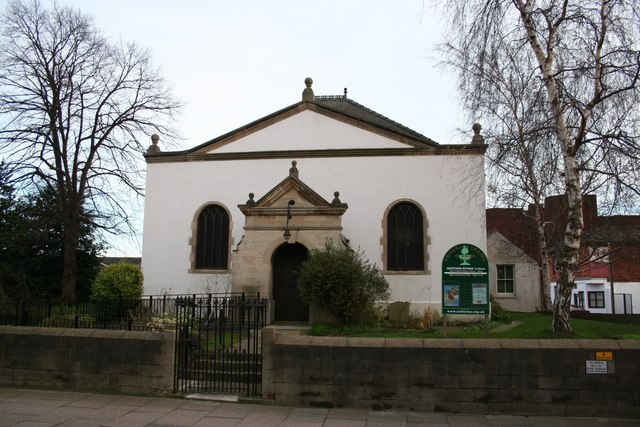
Front of the chapel, showing the porch

The Lincoln Unitarian Chapel is a Grade II listed Unitarian church on the High Street in the city of Lincoln in Lincolnshire, England, dating from 1725. The stone porch was added in 1819, and the chapel was extended at the rear in the 19th and 20th centuries.

== History ==
According to the church's website, the congregation was founded in 1662, and before 1725 met at John Disney's house. The building was recorded as a Presbyterian chapel from 1725 to 1792, a Calvinistic Methodist chapel from 1792 to 1803, a Nonconformist chapel from 1803 to 1837, and has been a Unitarian chapel since 1837, except in 1902–23 when it was not in use.

The existing building dates from 1725. The original single room had a porch added in 1819, and an extension to the east (rear) was present by 1887. A further extension to the south face of the rear was present by 1930. The building was restored in 1987.

== Description ==
The single-storey rectangular building is of red brick, which is mostly rendered, with limestone dressings, under a slate roof. The original Georgian building rests on a stone plinth. The main entrance on the High Street is on the west face and has a central limestone ashlar porch in Jacobean Revival style. The arched entrance has a keystone, with a pediment above. The west face has a pediment with ball finials. The paired windows to this face are of stone, with arched tops; Gothic Revival tracery was subsequently added. The north and south sides have two windows in similar style. The original rear (east) face windows have been partly obscured by the full-width, 19th-century extension, which is in red brick with a chimney. The interior has a pulpit and communion table in oak.
