= Baptist Chapel, Lincoln =

Barker Ross Group
- Baptist Chapel, Mint Street, Lincoln
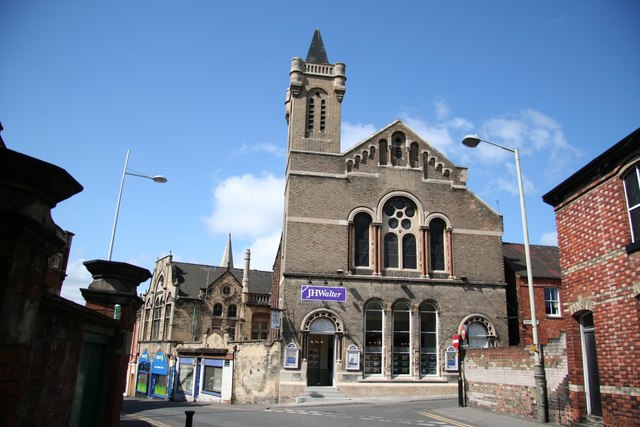
- The former Baptist Chapel on Mint Street/Mint Lane, now a property agency
- Barker Ross Group
- 53.229597°N 0.541579°W
- OS grid reference: SK 97448 71279
- Location: Lincoln, Lincolnshire
- Country: England
- Previous denomination: Baptism
- Website: www.barkerross.co.uk

History
- Former name(s): Baptist Chapel, Mint Street, Lincoln
- Status: Redundant, now in use for non-religious purposes
- Founded: 1870
- Dedicated: 1870
- Consecrated: 1870

Architecture
- Functional status: Now a property agency
- Heritage designation: Grade II listed
- Groundbreaking: 1870
- Completed: 1870
- Closed: 1980

Baptist Chapel is a Baptist Chapel on Mint Lane/Mint Street in Lincoln City Centre in Lincolnshire, England. It is a former Baptist Church and was originally built in 1870 and had a Sunday School attached. It was declared redundant in 1980 and was closed that same year. The chapel and Sunday school are now in use for an estate agents. The chapel is in a conservation area. The 1897 Sunday school building is grade II listed, along with its boundary wall.
