= High Bridge, Lincoln =

High Bridge
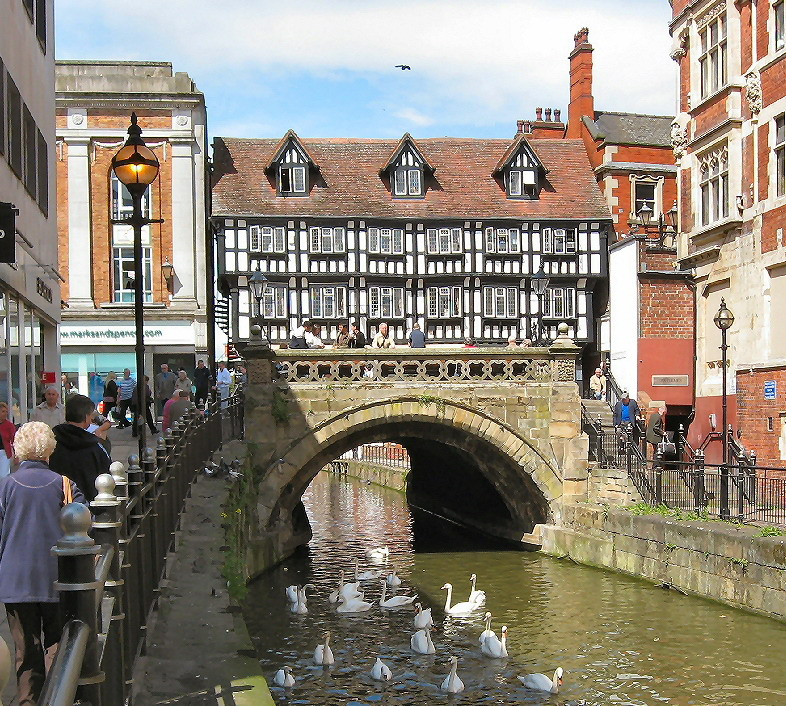
- Coordinates: 53°13′42.7″N 0°32′26.4″W
- Carries: High Street
- Crosses: River Witham
- Locale: Lincoln, Lincolnshire, England
- Heritage status: Grade I listed building

Characteristics
- Material: Stone

History
- Opened: 1160

Location
- Interactive map of High Bridge

High Bridge, also known as the Glory Hole, carries the High Street across the River Witham in the city of Lincoln in Lincolnshire, England. It is the oldest bridge in the United Kingdom on which buildings still stand.

== History ==
The bridge was built around 1160. The ribs of the original bridge survive, making it possibly the second-oldest masonry arch bridge in Britain and certainly the oldest with intact buildings on it. Churches and other ecclesiastical buildings were not uncommon on or near medieval bridges but High Bridge is unusual in carrying a secular building.

The current row of timber framed shops on the west side of the bridge date from about 1550. Stokes Tea & Coffee have been custodians of the building since 1937. The two upper storeys of the shops are jettied forward and at the corners there are carved figures of angels. The shops were partly dismantled and re-erected in 1901–02 under the supervision of the Lincoln architect William Watkins.

Bridges like this were common in the Middle Ages, the best known being London Bridge, but most have long since been demolished because of their obstruction to the river flow and to shipping.

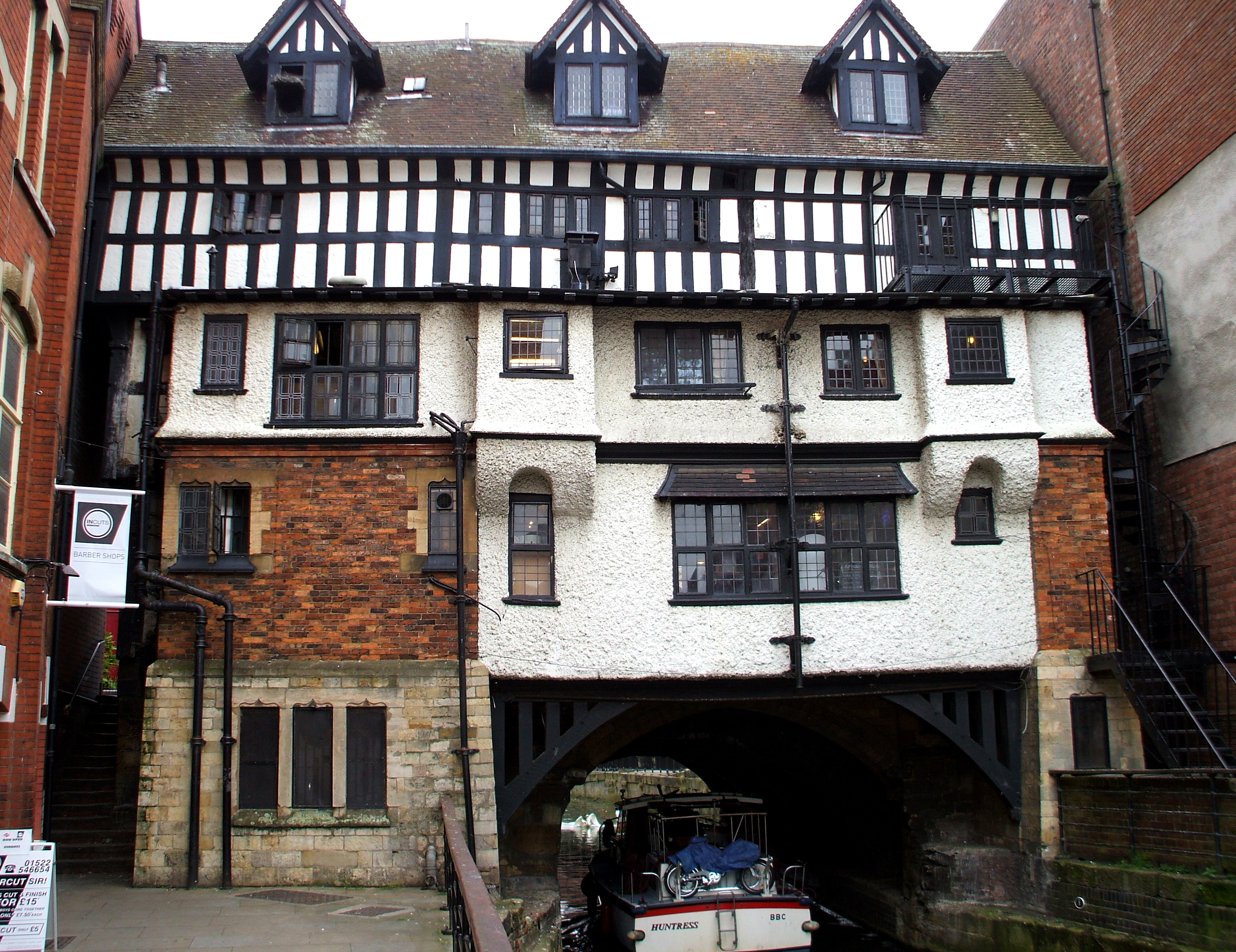
The 'Glory Hole'

The Glory Hole is the name given by generations of boaters to the High Bridge in Lincoln. Locally, the term extends to the pedestrian walkways leading up to the bridge, some of which sit on original wooden structures. The structure has a narrow and crooked arch which sets a limit on the size of boats using the Witham and going from Brayford Pool, at the start of Foss Dyke, to Boston and the sea.

Since the 14th century, the bridge has contributed to floods in Lincoln and after any heavy rain the bridge is virtually unnavigable to boats. A design by William Jessop in the 19th century to reroute the waters of the Witham through the south of the town was never implemented.

The bridge is both a grade I listed building and a scheduled monument.

For centuries the main thoroughfare through Lincoln was the High Street and all traffic had to cross High Bridge. A bypass was built in 1971, taking traffic away from the city centre, and the High Street, including the bridge, was pedestrianised.

== Design ==
The bridge has a single ashlar arch with a span of about 22 feet (6.7 metres). The oldest part is the centre, which was originally about 33 feet (10 m) long. It was made from five barrel vaulted ribs, of which the three inner ribs were 3 ft (0.91 m) wide and the two on the outside were 4 ft (1.2 m) wide. The bridge was extended by 28 ft (8.5 m) in the downstream direction in about 1235 to accommodate a bridge chapel. The extension was supported by quadripartite vaulting. At some point after this, two of the middle ribs under the original bridge and some of the vaulting connecting the original part to the extension was removed and replaced with brickwork, apparently to make the arch shallower at road level. A further extension of 20 ft (6.1 m) was added to the upstream upstream in the 1540s. This was a flatter arch with no vaulting, and was designed to support timber-framed buildings. In 1762, a further small extension was added to the downstream side, giving the bridge a total length of 87 ft (27 m).

The bridge chapel, built on the bridge in 1235, fell into disuse in 1549 as a result of the English Reformation. It was demolished in 1762 and a stone obelisk was built on its site as a conduit. The obelisk was removed in 1939 as it impeded traffic across the bridge.

== See also ==
- Alte Nahebrücke
- Krämerbrücke
- Ponte Vecchio
- Pont des Marchands
- Pulteney Bridge
