= Corn Exchange, Lincoln =

Commercial building in Lincoln, Lincolnshire, England

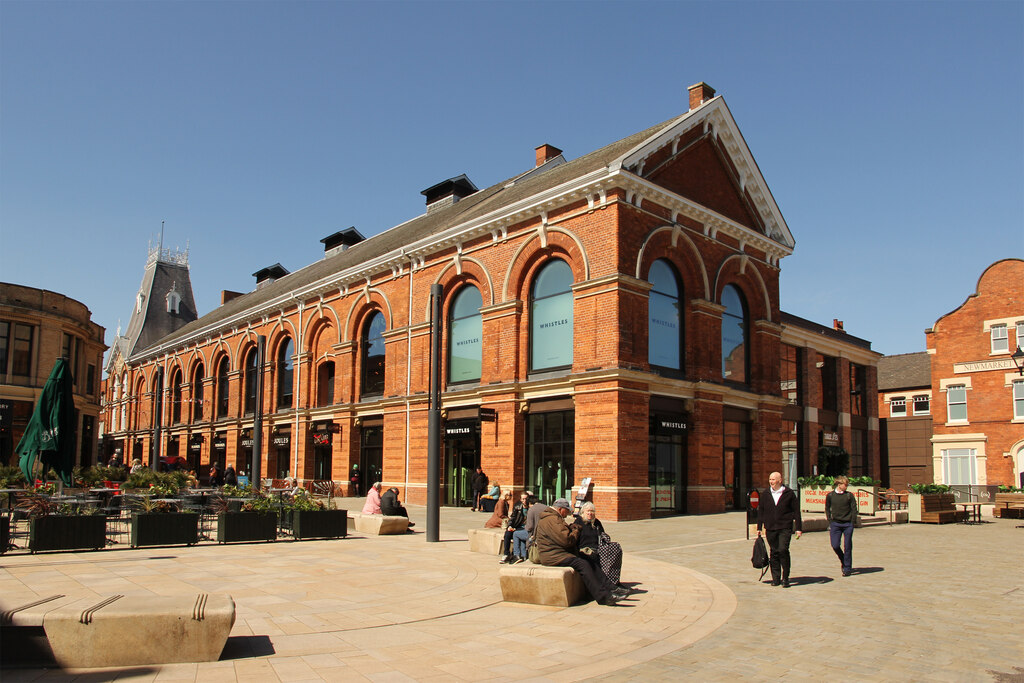
- Corn Exchange, Lincoln

- Shown in Lincolnshire
- 53.2276°N 0.5395°W
- Location: Sincil Street, Lincoln

History
- Built: 1879

Site notes
- Architect: Bellamy and Hardy
- Architectural style: Italianate style

Listed Building – Grade II
- Official name: Market Building
- Designated: 2 October 1969
- Reference no.: 1388502

The Corn Exchange is a commercial building in Sincil Street, Lincoln, Lincolnshire, England. The structure, which is now used as a restaurant and shops, is a Grade II listed building.

== History ==
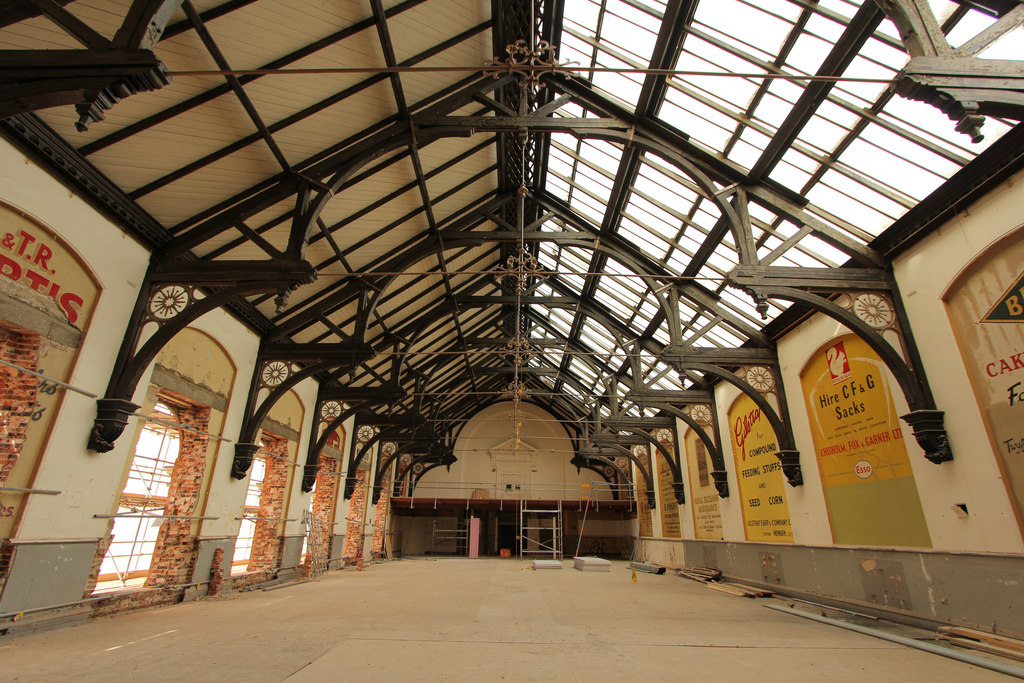
The interior of the building

Since the mid-19th century corn traders had been trading in the old corn exchange in the centre of Cornhill. However, in the mid-1870s directors of the "Lincoln Corn Exchange and Market Company", which operated the earlier building, decided to finance and commission a much more substantial corn exchange for the city.

The new building was designed by Bellamy and Hardy in the Italianate style, built by Walter and Hensmen of Horncastle in red brick with stone dressings at a cost of £9,000, and was officially opened with a grand concert in December 1879. The design involved an asymmetrical main frontage of twelve bays facing south onto Cornhill. The left-hand bay featured a wide opening on the ground floor, two tripartite square headed windows on the first floor and two tripartite round headed windows on the second floor. There was a gable above containing a diamond-shaped date stone and, behind that, a prominent mansard roof with brattishing. To the right, there were eleven bays with square headed openings on the ground floor and round headed windows with voussoirs, keystones and hood moulds on the first floor. Internally, the principal rooms were the covered hall on the ground floor and the corn hall, which featured a hammerbeam roof, on the first floor. Both rooms were 140 feet (43 m) long and 52 feet (16 m) wide.

The use of the building as a corn exchange declined significantly in the wake of the Great Depression of British Agriculture in the late 19th century. Instead the building was converted for use as a cinema known as the Cinematograph Hall in May 1910; it was re-branded as the Exchange Kinema in the 1930s and as the Astoria Cinema in 1954. It was then converted into a roller skating rink in 1957 and into a bingo hall in 1972. The building was acquired by the Lincolnshire Co-operative in the early 1990s and subsequently converted for retail use.

An extensive programme of refurbishment works, costing £12 million, was undertaken by Lindum Group on behalf of the Lincolnshire Co-operative to a design by Framework Architects and completed in January 2018. The project won the Heritage Category prize in the Greater Lincolnshire Construction & Property Awards in February 2018. Prince Richard, Duke of Gloucester visited the building to review the restoration work in July 2023.

== See also ==
- Corn exchanges in England
