= Central Methodist Church, Lincoln =

- Central Methodist Church
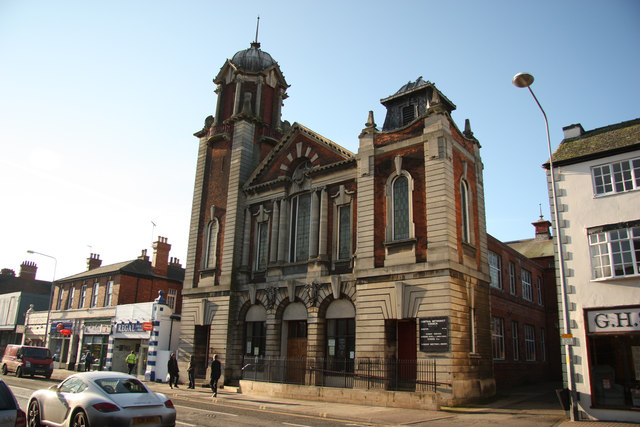
- Central Methodist Church, Lincoln
- Central Methodist Church, Lincoln
- 53.223008°N 0.543837°W
- OS grid reference: SK 97290 70545
- Location: High Street, Lincoln, Lincolnshire
- Country: England
- Denomination: Methodist
- Previous denomination: Primitive Methodist
- Website: lincolnmethodist.org.uk

History
- Former name(s): Portland Place Methodist Church, Portland Place Memorial Chapel
- Status: Active

Architecture
- Heritage designation: Grade II listed
- Designated: 20 December 1999
- Architect(s): Howdill & Sons
- Architectural type: Edwardian Baroque
- Completed: 1905

Central Methodist Church, Lincoln (formerly known as Portland Place Methodist Church) is a Grade II listed Methodist church in the city of Lincoln in Lincolnshire, England. It is an active place of worship in the Boultham area of the city near St Peter at Gowts church. The High Street face is in the Edwardian Baroque style, in red brick and limestone ashlar, with two unequal towers topped with domes.

== History ==
The church was built in 1905. The architects were the Leeds-based firm, Howdill & Sons (Thomas Howdill and his son, Charles Barker Howdill), who designed many Primitive Methodist chapels. It originally opened as Portland Place Methodist Church or Portland Place Memorial Chapel. The original congregation was Primitive Methodist. There was originally a Sunday School, meeting rooms and theatre to the rear. The name changed to the present one in 1932. Some of the interior furnishings, including the pulpit, were changed in 1968. The church was given Grade II listed building status in 1999.

== Description ==
The building's architectural style is given as "eclectic Edwardian Baroque" in its listing. Nicholas Antram, in his revised volume Lincolnshire, in the Pevsner Buildings of England series, notes the building materials and also comments on the style, "brick and much stone...with a great deal of rustication". He also records the Arts and Crafts influences on the building's tower.

The rectangular building is in red brick and ashlar limestone, which the listing considers could be Lincolnshire limestone; the main roofs are of slate, with the towers have lead roofs. The chapel forms the east part facing the High Street, with the Sunday School and associated rooms at the rear (west). The High Street front has two main storeys, with square towers rising to each side. The ground floor is in stone, while the upper storeys (including the towers) are in brick with stone dressings; in both cases the stone is grooved. The left (south) tower is substantially the taller of the two; it has an octagonal top section capped by a dome, which is surmounted by a finial. The right (north) tower has a lead-covered top section with a square dome. Both towers have a ground-floor entrance and grooved stone quoins.

The central section (between the towers) is set back from the street, with three arched entrances with keystones on the ground floor, which have elliptical cartouches between them, one of which bears the inscription "PORTLAND PLACE MEMORIAL 1906". The first floor has a large central window with "1905" inscribed above it, with doubled columns on either side, and two smaller windows with keystones, with single columns flanking. The central recessed section is surmounted by a pediment containing a semi-circular window.

The north and south faces are much less decorated, and have five windows to each storey. There is a further gabled wing at the rear housing the Sunday School and other rooms.

== Functions ==
The church holds religious services, and community events, and has a shop, the "Lincoln Community Grocery".

== Sources ==
- Pevsner, Nikolaus; Harris, John; Antram, Nicholas (2002). Lincolnshire. The Buildings of England. New Haven, US and London: Yale University Press. ISBN 0-300-09620-8.
