= Exchange Arcade, Lincoln =

Commercial building in Lincoln, Lincolnshire, England

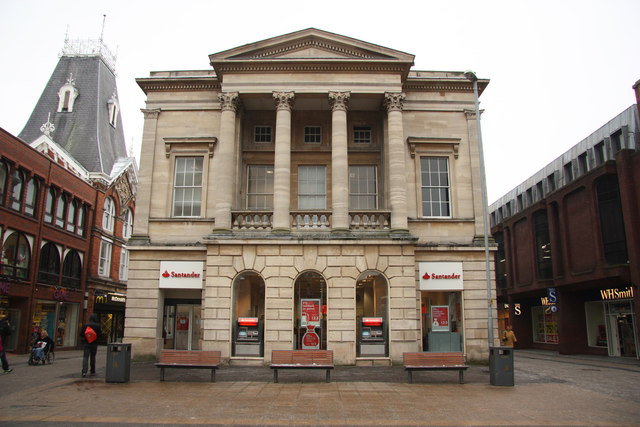
- Exchange Arcade, Lincoln

- Shown in Lincolnshire
- 53.2275°N 0.5399°W
- Location: Cornhill, Lincoln

History
- Built: 1848

Site notes
- Architect: William Adams Nicholson
- Architectural style: Neoclassical style

Listed Building – Grade II
- Official name: Former Corn Exchange
- Designated: 2 October 1969
- Reference no.: 1388501

The Exchange Arcade is a shopping mall on Cornhill in Lincoln, Lincolnshire, England. The structure, which was commissioned as a corn exchange, is a Grade II listed building.

== History ==
Originally, the local corn merchants conducted their business in the open air on Cornhill. In the mid-1840s, after finding this arrangement inadequate, a group of local businessmen decided to form a private company, known as the "Lincoln Corn Exchange and Market Company", to finance and commission a corn exchange for the town. The site they selected was undeveloped land to the east of the High Street.

The foundation stone for the new building was laid on 1 September 1847. It was designed by William Adams Nicholson in the neoclassical style, built in ashlar stone by Kirk and Parry of Sleaford at a cost of £15,000 and was officially opened on 31 March 1848. Prince Albert was an early visitor to the new building in April 1849.

The design involved a symmetrical main frontage of five bays facing onto Cornhill. The ground floor was rusticated and the central section of three bays, which was projected forward, formed a podium containing three round headed openings supporting a tetrastyle portico with Corinthian order columns, with a large entablature and pediment above. The outer bays were fenestrated on the first floor by sash windows with cornices supported by consoles and flanked by Corinthian order pilasters.

In the 1870s, civic officials decided to commission a new corn exchange, later known as the Market Hall, which was erected on the corner of Cornhill and Sincil Street and opened in December 1879. Meanwhile, the old corn exchange was significantly extended to the east with a bullnose shaped extension designed by Bellamy and Hardy and converted into a shopping arcade known as the Exchange Arcade which opened in 1880.

The building has been occupied by a large number of tenants since it became a shopping arcade. In the 1976, the basement area, which had originally been used as a grain store, was converted into a public house operated by Ruddles Brewery known as the Cornhill Vaults. At the east end the anchor store was occupied by the bookshop, Waterstones, from 2005 to 2021, when the unit was taken over by Superdry. Meanwhile, at the west end the main tenant has been Santander Bank since 2010.

== See also ==
- Corn exchanges in England
