= Brayford Pool =

Body of water in Lincoln, England

Coordinates: 53.22870°N 0.54502°W

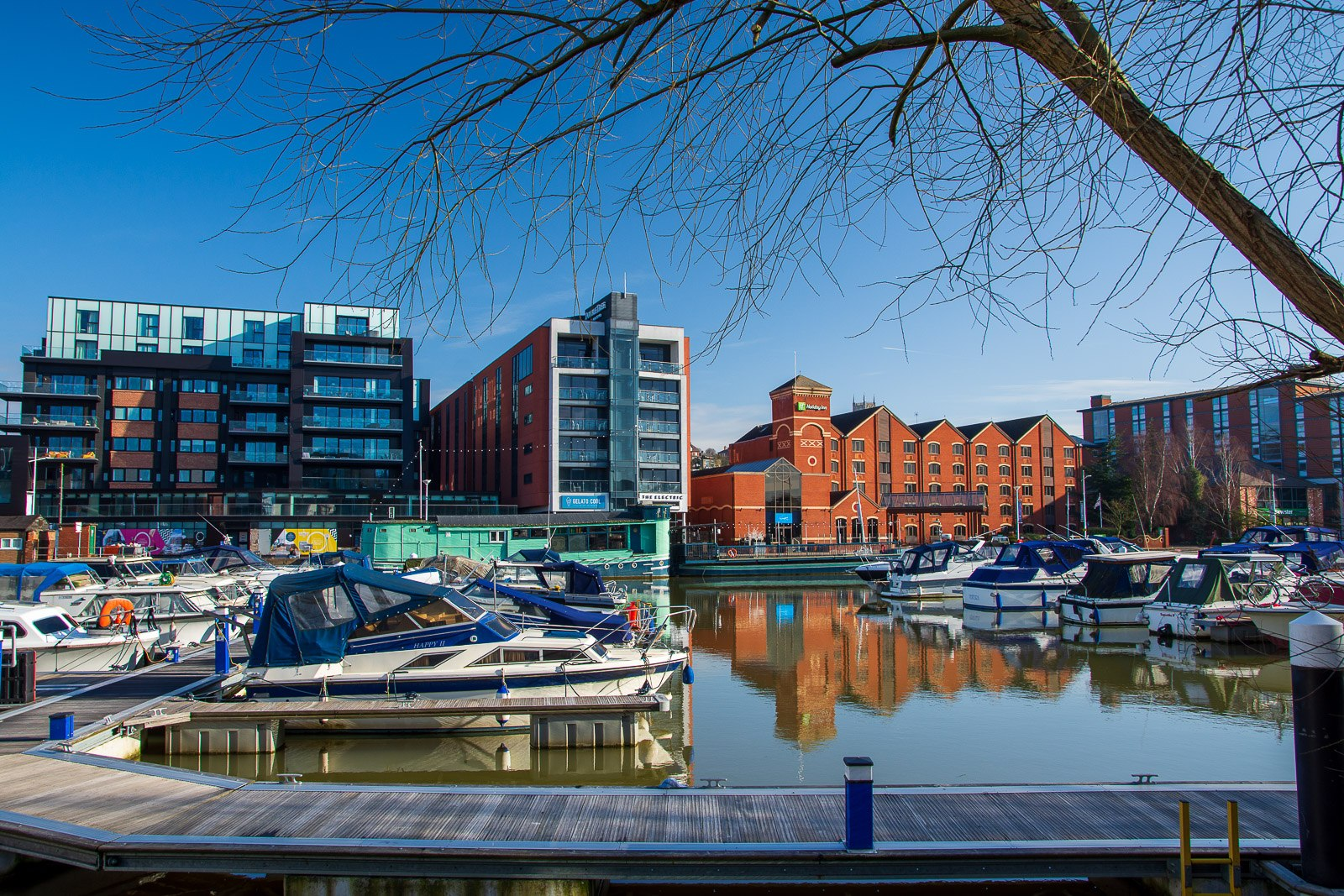
Brayford Pool

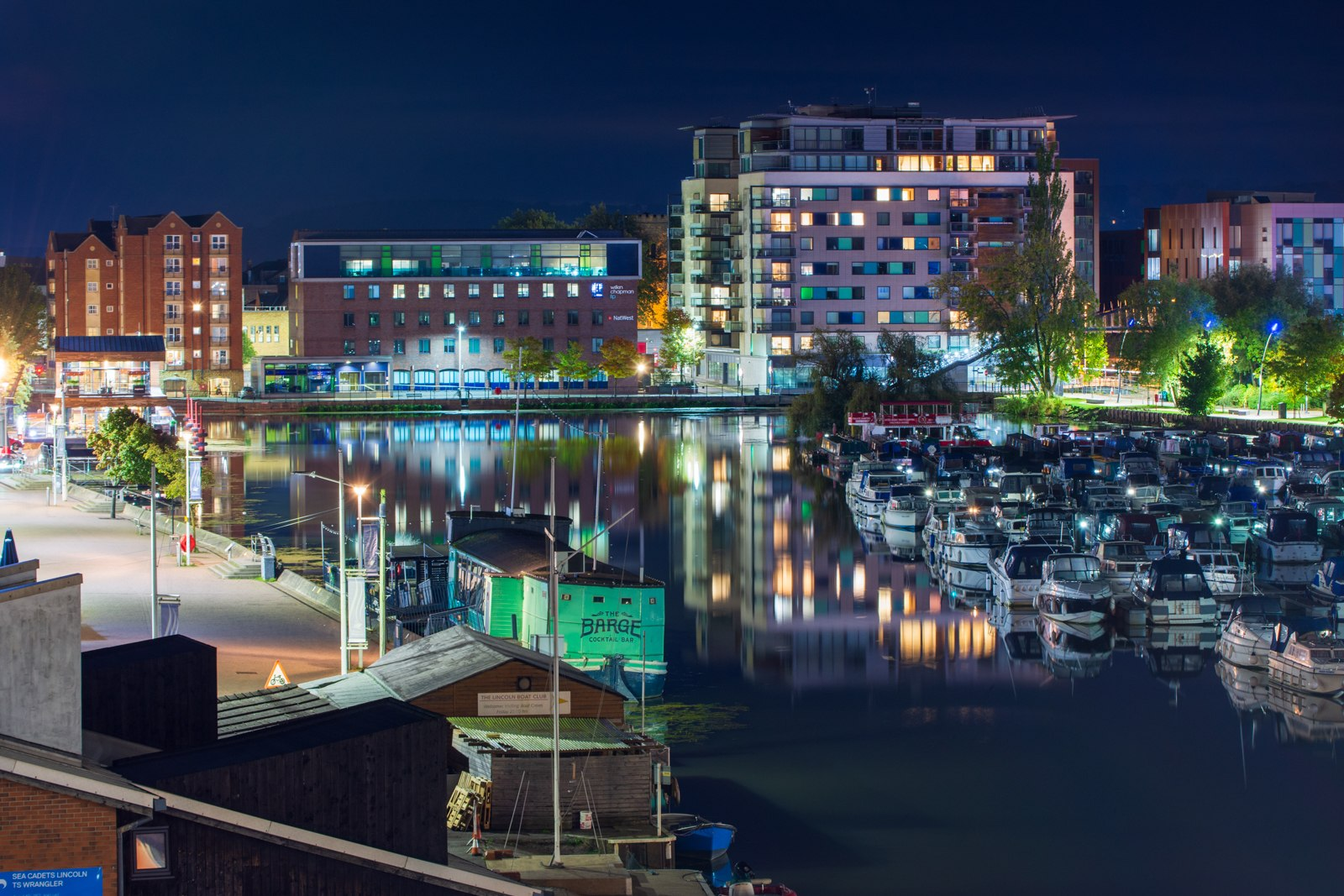
The Brayford Pool

Brayford Pool is a natural pool formed from a widening of the River Witham in the centre of the city of Lincoln in England. It was used as a port by the Romans – who connected it to the River Trent by constructing the Foss Dyke – and has a long industrial heritage.

Today, the waterfront surrounding the pool is home to a range of hotels, restaurants, bars, entertainment venues and a modern University (the University of Lincoln). There is also a year-long programme of events on the waterfront including vehicle displays, music evenings and carnival parades.

== History and profile ==
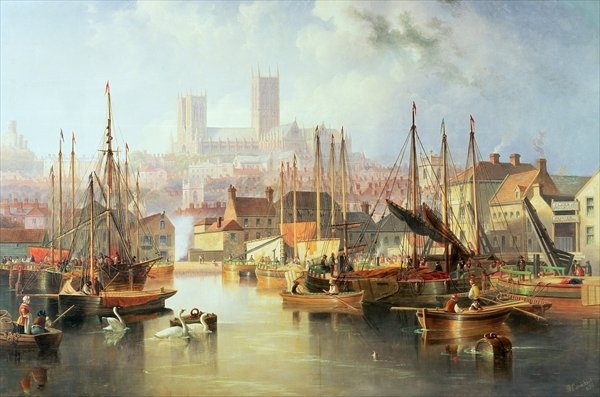
The Brayford Pool and Lincoln Cathedral by John Wilson Carmichael

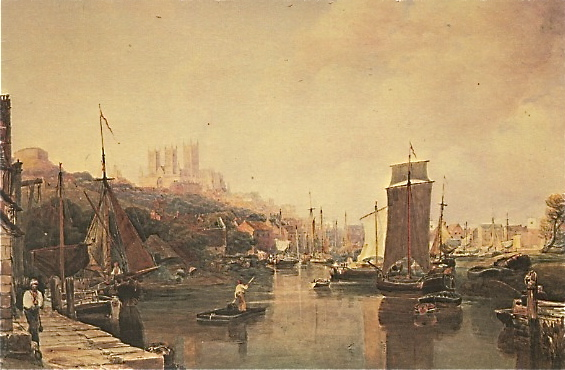
Peter De Wint, Brayford Pool from the Foss Dyke c.1820

Brayford Pool is the oldest inland harbour in the United Kingdom. The adjacent land is known variably as Brayford Waterfront and Brayford Wharf.

The Pool has been the focus of Lincoln's urban regeneration since the early 1990s. It is now overlooked by bars, restaurants, a cinema and, most significantly, the University of Lincoln. The Pool is used as a marina by houseboats and pleasure craft, as well as by anglers and kayakers.

The Brayford Pool is known for its large population of mute swans (Cygnus olor). The swans made the news in 2004, over concerns about the birds' diet and overall health, as well as the appearance on the Pool of a number of Australian black swans (Cygnus atratus).

Also located on the Brayford Pool is the Lincoln Unit of the Sea Cadet Corps – T.S. Wrangler.

Brayford Island, also known as Swan Island, is a man-made island in the Pool. Speculation about its origins has led it to be of historical interest.
