= St. Catherine's Church =

St. Catherine's Church, St. Catharine's Church, Church of St. Catherine, or variations thereof, may refer to:

== Croatia ==
- St. Catherine's Church, Zagreb

== Egypt ==
- St. Catherine Church, Mansheya, Alexandria
- St. Catherine Church, Heliopolis, Cairo

== Finland ==
- St. Catherine's Church, Turku
- St. Catherine of Alexandria Church, Hammarland

== Germany ==
Churches dedicated to the Saint may be called St. Katharina (mostly Catholic) or Katharinenkirche (mostly Protestant)

- St. Catherine's Church, Frankfurt, Frankfurt am Main
- St. Catherine's Church, Hamburg
- St. Catherine's Church, Lübeck
- Katharinenkirche, Oppenheim

== Greece ==
- Church of St. Catherine, Thessaloniki

== Ireland ==
- St Catherine's Church, Dublin (Church of Ireland)
- St Catherine's Church, Dublin (Roman Catholic)

== Israel ==
- Church of Saint Catherine, Bethlehem

== Latvia ==
- St. Catherine's Lutheran Church, Riga
- St. Catherine's Roman Catholic Church, Riga

== Lithuania ==
- Church of St. Catherine, Vilnius

== Malta ==
- St Catherine's Chapel, Mqabba
- Church of St Catherine of Italy, Valletta
- Church of St Catherine, Żejtun
- Church of St Catherine, Żurrieq

== Netherlands ==
- St Catherine's Cathedral, Utrecht

== Poland ==
- St. Catherine's Church, Gdańsk
- St Catherine's Church, Warsaw

== Romania ==
- St. Catherine's Church, Bucharest

== Russia ==
- Catholic Church of St. Catherine (Saint Petersburg)
- Saint Catherine's Armenian Church, Saint Petersburg
- Evangelical Lutheran Church of Saint Katarina, Saint Petersburg
- The Lutheran Church of the Holy Catherine, Omsk

== Slovakia ==
- Church of St. Catherine, Banská Štiavnica
- St Catherine's Church, Dolný Kubín
- Church of Saint Catherine of Alexandria

== Spain ==
- St. Catherine's Church, Valencia

== Ukraine ==
- St. Catherine's Cathedral, Kherson
- Church of St. Catherine, Dnipro

== United Kingdom ==
=== England ===
- St Catherine of Siena Church, Birmingham
- St Catherine's Church, Nechells, Birmingham
- St Catherine's Church, Over Alderley, Cheshire
- St Catherine's Church, Boot, Cumbria
- St Katherine's Church, Rowsley, Derbyshire
- Royal Chapel of St Katherine-upon-the-Hoe, Plymouth, Devon
- St Catherine's Chapel, Abbotsbury, Dorset
- St Katharine's Church, Southbourne, Dorset
- St Catharine's Church, Scholes, Greater Manchester
- St Catherine's Church, Horwich, Greater Manchester
- St Catherine's Church, Hoarwithy, Herefordshire
- Church of St Katharine, Ickleford, Hertfordshire
- St Catherine's Church, Ventnor, Isle of Wight
- St Katharine's Church, Knockholt, Kent
- St Catherine's Church, Preston-next-Faversham, Kent
- St Katherine's Church, Lincoln, Lincolnshire
- St Katherine Coleman, London
- St Katharine Cree, London
- St Katherine's Church, Plaistow, London
- St Catherine's Church, West Drayton, London
- St Katherine Westway, Hammersmith, London
- St Catherine's Chapel, Lydiate, Merseyside
- St Catharine's Church, Nottingham, East Midlands
- St Catherine's Church, Draughton, Northamptonshire
- St Catherine's Church, Cossall, Nottinghamshire
- St Katherine's Church, Teversal, Nottinghamshire
- St Catherine's Church, Drayton, Somerset
- Church of St Katherine, East Woodlands, Somerset
- St Catherine's Church, Fivehead, Somerset
- Church of St Catherine, Montacute, Somerset
- Church of St Catherine, St Catherine, Somerset
- St Catherine's Church, Littlehampton, West Sussex

=== Wales ===
- St Catherine's Church, Llanfaes, Anglesey
- St Catherine's Church, Canton, Cardiff
- St Catherine's Church, Pontypridd

== United States ==
- St. Catherine of Siena Church (Riverside, Connecticut)
- St. Catherine of Siena Church (Trumbull, Connecticut)
- St. Catherine of Siena Parish, Wilmington, Delaware
- St. Catherine of Siena Roman Catholic Church, Detroit, Michigan
- St. Katherine's Chapel, Williamston, Michigan
- St. Catharine Church (Spring Lake, New Jersey)
- St. Catherine of Genoa's Church (New York City)
- St. Catherine of Siena's Church (New York City)
- St. Catherine's Church of Lomice, North Dakota
- St. Catherine of Siena (Moscow, Pennsylvania)

== See also ==
- St. Catherine (disambiguation)
- St Catherine's Chapel (disambiguation)
- St. Catherine's Priory (disambiguation)
