= St Catherine's College =

St Catherine's College may refer to:

== U.K. ==
- St Catharine's College, Cambridge, one of the constituent colleges of the University of Cambridge, England
- St Catherine's College, Oxford, one of the constituent colleges of the University of Oxford, England
- St Catherine's College, Eastbourne, a Church of England academy in Eastbourne, England
- St Catherine's College, Armagh, Northern Ireland
- St Catherine's College of Education for Home Economics, a defunct college in Dublin, Ireland
- St Catherine's College, Wellington, New Zealand

== U.S. ==
- St. Catharine College, near Springfield, Kentucky
- College of St. Catherine, St. Catherine University in Saint Paul and Minneapolis, Minnesota

== See also ==
- St. Catherine College or Colégio Santa Catarina, a Catholic school located in Novo Hamburgo, Rio Grande do Sul, Brazil
- St. Catherine University (Japan), Matsuyama, Ehime, Japan
- University of Santa Catalina, El Burgo de Osma, Spain
- St. Catherine University, Saint Paul and Minneapolis, Minnesota, United States
- St. Catherine (disambiguation)
- St Catherine's School (disambiguation)
