= St Catherine's Chapel =

St Catherine's Chapel may refer to:

- St Catherine's Chapel, Abbotsbury, in Dorset, England
- St Catherine's Chapel, Artington, in Surrey, England
- St Catherine's Chapel, Lydiate, in Merseyside, England
- St. Catherine's Chapel (Massey College), Chapel Royal in Toronto, Canada
- St Catherine's Chapel, Oxford, in Oxfordshire, England
- Royal Chapel of St Katherine-upon-the-Hoe, in Plymouth, England
- St. Katherine's Chapel, Williamston, Michigan
- St Catherine's Chapel, Mqabba, in Mqabba, Malta
- Chapel of St. Catherine (Goa, India)

== See also ==
- St. Catherine (disambiguation)
- St. Catherine's Church (disambiguation)
