= St Catherine's School =

St. Catherine's School, College or University may refer to:

== Australia ==
- St Catherine's School, Toorak, in Melbourne
- St Catherine's School, Waverley, in Sydney

== South Africa ==
- St Catherine's School, in Empangeni, KwaZulu-Natal
- St Catherine's Convent School, in Florida, Gauteng
- St Catherine's School, Germiston, Gauteng

== United Kingdom ==
- St Catherine's Catholic High School, a secondary school in Halifax, West Yorkshire, England
- St Catherine's Catholic School for Girls, a secondary school in Bexleyheath, London, England
- St Catherine's College, Oxford, one of the constituent colleges of the University of Oxford, England
- St Catharine's College, Cambridge, one of the constituent colleges of the University of Cambridge, England
- St Catherine's School, Bramley, an independent girls' school in the village of Bramley, near Guildford, Surrey, England
- St Catherine's School, Twickenham, an independent girls' school in Twickenham, London, England
- St Catherine's School, Ventnor, a residential special school on the Isle of Wight, England
- St Catherine's College, Armagh, in Armagh, Northern Ireland

== United States ==
- St. Catherine's Academy, in Anaheim, California
- St. Catherine of Siena School (Martinez, California)
- St. Catherine of Siena Church and School, Reseda, California
- St. Catherine of Siena School (Vallejo, California)
- St. Catharine College, near Springfield, Kentucky
- St. Catherine of Siena School (Metairie, Louisiana)
- St. Catherine University, in Saint Paul and Minneapolis, Minnesota
- St. Catharine Academy, in the Bronx, New York
- St. Catherine's Montessori School, in Houston, Texas
- St. Catherine's School (Richmond, Virginia)
- St. Catherine's High School (Racine, Wisconsin)

== Other countries ==
- St. Catherine College or Colégio Santa Catarina, in Novo Hamburgo, Rio Grande do Sul, Brazil
- St. Catharine's School for Girls (Kwun Tong), in Hong Kong, China
- St Catherine's College of Education for Home Economics, Dublin, Ireland
- St. Catherine High School, in St Catherine, Jamaica
- St. Catherine University (Japan), in Matsuyama, Ehime, Japan
- St. Catharine's School for Girls (Kwun Tong), in Hong Kong
- St Catherine's College, Wellington, in Kilbirnie, New Zealand
- St Catherine's School, now St. Brendan, in Montevideo, Uruguay
- Pontifical and Royal University of St. Catherine or University of Santa Catalina (1550–1841), in El Burgo de Osma, Spain
- St. Catherine's School, now Colegio San Gabriel Colonia, Uruguay

== See also ==
- St. Catherine (disambiguation)
- St Katherine's School
