= St. Catherine =

St. Catherine or St. Katherine may refer to a number of saints named Catherine, or:

== Geography ==
=== Canada ===
- St. Catharines, a city in Ontario
- St. Catharines (federal electoral district), federal
- St. Catharines (provincial electoral district), in Ontario
- Sainte-Catherine, Quebec, a city in Quebec

=== United Kingdom ===
- St Catherine, Somerset, a village and civil parish in Somerset, England
- St Catherine's, Lincoln, an area of Lincoln, Lincolnshire, England
- St Catherine's Hill, Dorset, a hill in Dorset, England
- St. Catherine's Hill, Hampshire, a chalk hill in Hampshire, England
- St Catherine's Hill, Surrey, a sandstone hill in Surrey, England
- St. Catherine's Down, a chalk down on the Isle of Wight, England
- St Catherine's Point, the southernmost point on the Isle of Wight
- St. Catherine's Valley, a valley in South Gloucestershire, England
- St Catherine's Wood, a park in Manchester, England
- St Catherines, Argyll, a village in Argyll and Bute, Scotland
- St Catherine's Island, a tidal island in Pembrokeshire, Wales
- St Katharine's by the Tower, a religious precinct in London (1147–1825)
- St Katharine Docks, a former dock and now a mixed-use district in central London

=== United States ===
- St. Catherine, Florida, an unincorporated community
- Saint Catharine, Kentucky, an unincorporated community
- St. Catharine, Missouri, an unincorporated community
- St. Catherines Island, on the coast of Georgia
- St. Katherine's Historic District, in Davenport, Iowa
- Lake St. Catherine (Louisiana), a lake in New Orleans, Louisiana

=== Elsewhere ===
- Saint Catherine, Egypt, a city in the South Sinai Governorate, Egypt
- Saint Catherine Parish, a parish in Middlesex, Jamaica

== Hospitals ==
- St Catherine's Health Centre, in Birkenhead, Merseyside, England
- St Catherine's Hospital, Doncaster, in Doncaster, South Yorkshire, England
- St. Catherine's Hospital, Rochester a 1315 leper hospital in Rochester, Kent

== Monasteries and convents ==
- Saint Catherine's Monastery, a monastery in Saint Catherine, Egypt
- St Catharine's Convent, Augsburg, Germany
- St Catharine's Convent, Edinburgh, Scotland
- St. Catherine of Sienna Convent, a convent in Springfield, Kentucky
- St. Catherine's Priory, Lincoln, a priory in Lincolnshire, England
- St. Catherine's Priory, Ribe, a Dominican priory in Denmark
- St. Catherine's Priory, Roskilde, a Dominican priory in Denmark
- St. Katherine's Abbey, Monisternagalliaghduff, an Augustinian nunnery in County Limerick, Ireland

== Schools ==
- St Catherine's School (disambiguation), many schools, colleges and universities
- St Catharine's College, Cambridge, a college of Cambridge University
- St Catherine's College, Oxford, a college of Oxford University
- St Katherine's School, a secondary school in Somerset, England
- St. Katherine College, a four-year undergraduate college in Encinitas, California

== Other ==
- St. Catherine (album), a 2015 album by the band Ducktails
- MV St Catherine, a 1983 ferry, crossing Portsmouth to Fishbourne, Isle of Wight, England
- St. Catharine (Waldorf, Maryland) or Dr. Samuel A. Mudd House, a historic house in Maryland
- St Catherine's Castle, a small device fort in Cornwall, England
- St Catherine's Court, a Tudor manor house in north of Bath, England
- St Catherine's Fort, a Palmerston fort
- St. Catherine International Airport, in Saint Catherine, Egypt
- St. Catherine's Day or Kadripäev, a celebration in Estonia
- Feast of Saint Catherine, a religious and civil celebration annually held in Italy and other locations
- Order of Saint Catherine, an award of Imperial Russia
- Order of Saint Catherine the Great Martyr, an award of Russia established in 2012
- St. Catherine, a tune by Henri F. Hemy used in hymns such as "Faith of Our Fathers Living Still" and the baptismal hymn "O Jesus Christ Our Lord Most Dear"

== See also ==
- Saint Catherine of Alexandria (disambiguation)
- St. Catherine's Church (disambiguation)
- Sainte-Catherine (disambiguation)
- St Catherine's Chapel (disambiguation)
- St Catherine's College (disambiguation)
- St. Catherine's Priory (disambiguation)
- Santa Catalina (disambiguation)
- Santa Catarina (disambiguation)
- Santa Caterina (disambiguation)
- Święta Katarzyna (disambiguation)
