= Church of Saint Katherine of Alexandria =

Church of Saint Katherine of Alexandria may refer to:

- Church of Saint Catherine of Alexandria, Topoľčianky, Slovakia
- Church of Saint Katherine of Alexandria (Rosina), Slovakia
