= St. Catherine's Priory =

St. Catherine's Priory may refer to:

- St. Catherine's Priory, Ribe, a Dominican priory in Ribe, Denmark
- St. Catherine's Priory, Roskilde, a Dominican priory in Roskilde, Denmark
- St Katherine's Priory, Lincoln, a priory in Lincolnshire, England, UK
- St Katherine's Priory, a Benedictine priory in Exeter, UK

== See also ==
- St. Catherine (disambiguation)
- St. Catherine's Church (disambiguation)
