= Bracebridge =

Bracebridge may refer to:

- Bracebridge, Lincolnshire, England
  - Nearby: Bracebridge Heath
- Bracebridge, Nottinghamshire, England
- Bracebridge, Ontario, Canada
