= Froebel College of Education =

Former Irish teachers college

Coordinates: 53.301286°N 6.189203°W

- Coláiste Oideachais Froebel
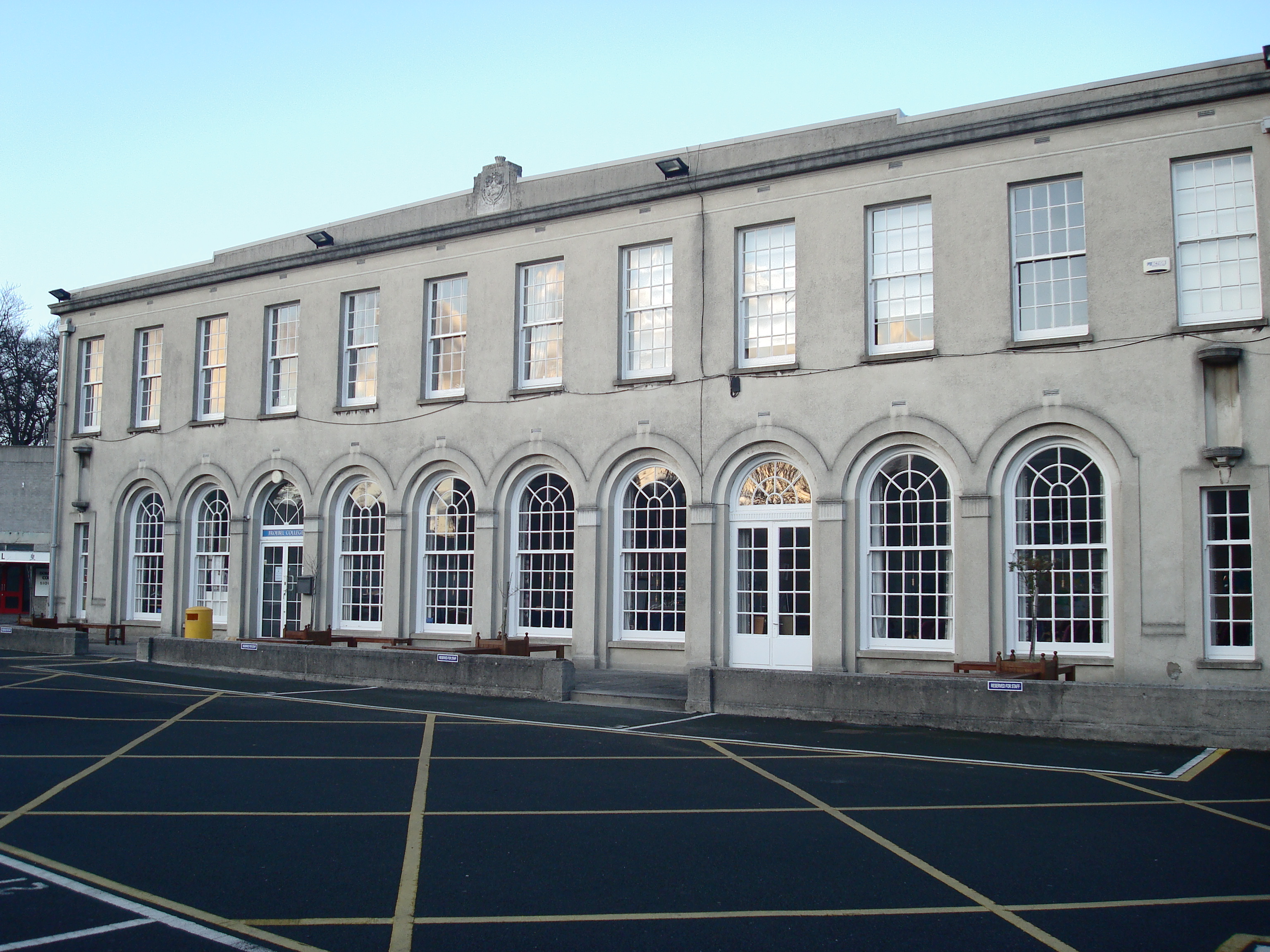
- Other names: Froebel
- Type: Public
- Active: 1943–2013
- Affiliations: CERC, University of Dublin, Maynooth University
- President: Marie McLoughlin
- Students: 250
- Location: Dublin, Ireland
- Campus: Suburban
- Website: www.froebel.ie

Froebel College of Education was one of five colleges in the Republic of Ireland which was recognised by the Department of Education for the training and education of national school teachers. It was located at Sion Hill, Cross Avenue, Blackrock, Dublin and was run by the Dominican Order.

Froebel College, along with Coláiste Mhuire of Marino and the Church of Ireland College of Education Rathmines had been associated with Trinity College Dublin, which both awarded the degree of Bachelor in Education (B.Ed.) and the Higher Diploma in Education (Primary Teaching). The college also ran a BA degree in Early Childhood - Teaching and Learning (NUIM) and a one-year Post-Graduate Diploma in Special Education (NUIM). From September 2010, incoming students of Froebel College were being accredited by Maynooth University (MU).

== History ==
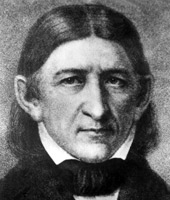
Friedrich Froebel

The college was established in 1943 by the Congregation of Dominican Sisters Sion Hill, who also ran the St Catherine's College of Education for Home Economics from 1929 to 2007, in Sion Hill, Blackrock. The 1970s saw the college's qualifications attain B.Ed. status, when Froebel had its degrees accredited by the University of Dublin. In 2008 a refurbishment of the buildings in Blackrock was completed. In April 2010 plans for Froebel College to move to Maynooth University were announced. In October 2016 Froebel College moved to a new permanent home, a purpose built facility on the Maynooth University campus.

Froebel Education is associated with progressive child-centred education. It seeks to foster quality teaching and learning, creativity, integration and sound practical classroom management in whatever situations teachers work with children.

In 2008 Marie McLoughlin was appointed President of the college up until the merger with Maynooth University. Other presidents have included Sr. Darina Hosey OP and Sr. Simeon Tarpey OP.

=== Name ===
Froebel College of Education took its name from the 19th-century German educator, and founder of Kindergarten, Friedrich Fröbel (1782 - 1852). He advocated reverence for the child, learning through activity, exploration of the environment, enjoyment of beauty in all its manifestations and acceptance of the gifts of each individual.

== Move to Maynooth University ==
Since September 2013, the Froebel College of Education course is located at Maynooth University. The university established a "Froebel Department of Early Childhood and Primary Education" and is the first Irish university campus to offer a full-time B.Ed. degree course to enable students to qualify as primary teachers.

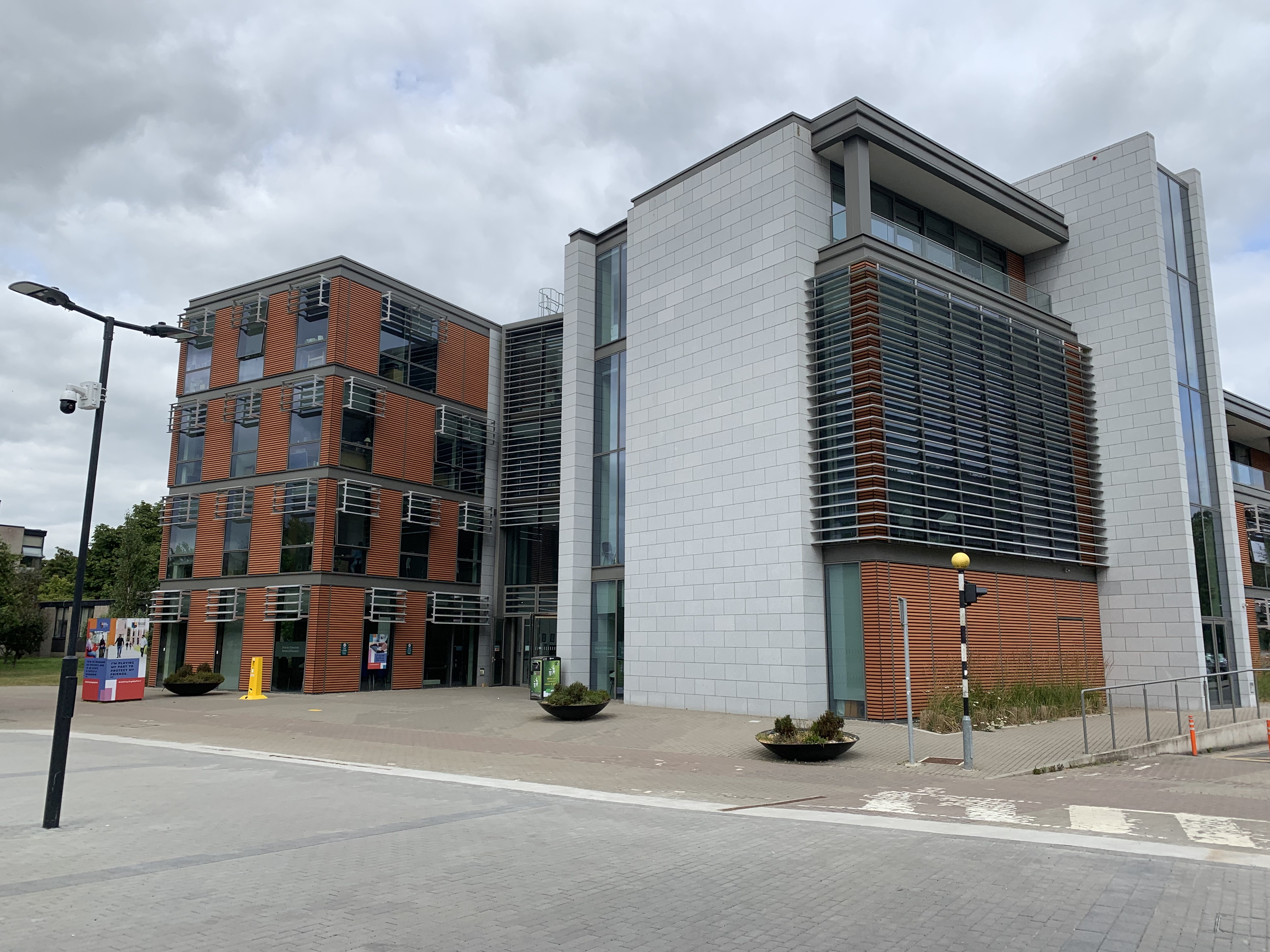
Froebel Department of Early Childhood and Primary Education at Maynooth University
