= Święta Katarzyna =

Święta Katarzyna ("Saint Catherine") may refer to the following places in Poland:

- Święta Katarzyna, Lower Silesian Voivodeship (south-west Poland)
- Święta Katarzyna, Świętokrzyskie Voivodeship (south-central Poland)

== See also ==
- St. Catherine (disambiguation)
