= Sainte-Catherine =

Sainte-Catherine may refer to:

== Places ==
=== Belgium ===
- Place Sainte-Catherine, a square in Brussels
- Sainte-Catherine metro station, a metro station in Brussels

=== Canada ===
- Sainte-Catherine, Quebec, a municipality of Quebec in Roussillon
- Sainte-Catherine-de-Hatley, a municipality of Quebec in Memphrémagog
- Sainte-Catherine-de-la-Jacques-Cartier, a municipality of Quebec in La Jacques-Cartier
- Baie-Sainte-Catherine, a municipality of Quebec in Charlevoix-Est
- Saint Catherine Street, a commercial street in Montreal, Quebec
- St. Catharines, Ontario

=== France ===
- Sainte-Catherine, Pas-de-Calais, unofficially Sainte-Catherine-lès-Arras, a commune in the Pas-de-Calais département
- Sainte-Catherine, Puy-de-Dôme, in the Puy-de-Dôme département
- Sainte-Catherine, Rhône, in the Rhône département
- Sainte-Catherine-de-Fierbois, in the Indre-et-Loire département

== Transit ==
- Sainte-Catherine station (Exo), Saint-Constant, Quebec, Canada
- Sainte-Catherine/Sint-Katelijne metro station, Brussels, Belgium
- Sainte-Catherine tram stop, Bordeaux, France

== See also ==
- Saint Catherine's Monastery
- St. Catherine (disambiguation)
- Santa Caterina (disambiguation)
