= Santa Caterina =

Santa Caterina may refer to:

== Places ==
- Santa Catarina (state), Brazil
- Santa Caterina Albanese, in the Province of Cosenza, Italy
- Santa Caterina dello Ionio, in the Province of Catanzaro, Italy
- Santa Caterina Villarmosa, in the Province of Caltanissetta, Italy
- Santa Caterina di Valfurva, ski resort and frazione of the commune Valfurva in the Province of Sondrio, Italy
- Santa Caterina, Roccalbegna, in the Province of Grosseto, Italy

== Buildings ==
- Santa Caterina a Chiaia, a church in Naples
- Santa Caterina a Formiello, a church in Naples
- Santa Caterina (Livorno), a church in Livorno
- Santa Caterina d'Alessandria, a church in Palermo
- Santa Caterina d'Alessandria, a church in Pisa, in the Province of Tuscany, Italy
- Santa Caterina a Magnanapoli, a church in Rome
- Santa Caterina a Via Giulia, a church in the Via Giulia in Rome
- Santa Caterina dei Funari, a church in Rome
- Santa Caterina del Sasso, a monastery on the shore of Lake Maggiore
- Santa Caterina, Urbania, a church in Urbania, Marche, Italy
- Santa Caterina, Venice, a deconsecrated church in Venice

== See also ==
- Santa Catarina (disambiguation)
- Sainte-Catherine (disambiguation)
- St. Catherine (disambiguation)
