= St Katherine's Priory, Lincoln =

The Priory of Saint Katherine without Lincoln
- Location within Lincolnshire
- Interactive map of The Priory of Saint Katherine without Lincoln

Monastery information
- Order: Gilbertine
- Established: Mid 12th Cent
- Disestablished: 14 July 1538
- Mother house: Sempringham Priory
- Diocese: Lincoln
- Controlled churches: • Saint Wilfred's, Alford with Rigsby Chapel • All Saints, Bracebridge • All Saints, Canwick (A Prebend) • Saint Michael and All Angels, Hackthorn • All Saints, Harmston • All Saints, Friskney • Saint Margaret's, Marton • Mere • St Mary Magdalene, Newark-on-Trent • The chapel in Newark Castle • Saint Peter's Newton on Trent • North Hykeham • Saint Peter's, Norton Disney • Saxby • All Saints, Stapleford

People
- Founders: Saint Gilbert of Sempringham, Bishop Robert de Chesney

Architecture
- Functional status: defunct

Site
- Location: St Catherine's Lincoln, U.K.
- Coordinates: 53.2129°N 0.5470°W
- Visible remains: No remains
- Public access: Public access to all roads in Saint Catherine's that have been built over the site and to the Parish Church of Saint Katherine built over the site of the Priory Church

St Katherine's Priory also known as The Priory of Saint Katherine without Lincoln was a Gilbertine priory of Canons Regular on the Fosse Way just outside the walls of Lincoln, England. The priory ran the Hospital of St Sepulchre, probably the first hospital in the city.

== History ==
The community which followed the Rule of Saint Augustine was founded not long after the approval of St Gilbert's order in 1148 when Robert de Chesney invited them to minister in the city. The priory and church came with the Hospital of Saint Sepulchre which had been established by Bishop of Lincoln Robert Bloet sometime between 1093 and 1123. The community was chiefly male, made up of around 16 Canons, but there is evidence of a number of female lay sisters living alongside to help with medical care in the hospital.

The community was under the patronage of Saint Catherine of Alexandria, a fourth century Egyptian missionary, philosopher and martyr, the patron saint of learning and the dying. The key figures were the prior, the sub-prior, the cellarer, the precentor, and the sacrist. In addition to the duties of singing the eight daily Liturgies of the Hours and the Conventual Mass in the priory church the Canons also had responsibility for the care of numerous other parishes. These included the prebendary of Canwick, the Parish of St Mary Magdalene, Newark-on-Trent, and the chapel in Newark Castle, as well as the parishes or Rectories of Alford with Rigsby Chapel, Bracebridge, Hackthorn, Harmston, Friskney, Marton, Mere, Newton on Trent, North Hykeham Norton Disney, Saxby and Stapleford. Ministry in these parishes would largely have been left to hire secular clergy, but some of the closer villages like Bracebridge may have been under the direct auspicies of the Canons. A large part of their time would have been spent hearing the Confessions of the sick, ministering Last Rites to the dying, and praying for the needs of the community at large. In 1291 Pope Nicholas IV granted a spiritual Indulgence to anyone who made pilgrimage to the priory on St Catherine's, St Gilbert's, and St James's feast days.

As well as the prime focus of medical, pastoral, and spiritual care the community had a number of agricultural land endowments. In 1285 a windmill was constructed next to the main priory site and in 1306 an aqueduct. By 1535, a few years before the dissolution, these included the granges or manors of Belchford, Cherry Willingham, Harmston, Long Bennington, North Hykeham, Stapleford, Saxby, and Wellingore; in Nottinghamshire, Coddington, and Yorkshire Brampton. St Katherine's also held other lands and rents in Lincolnshire, as well as gaining income from the parish churches listed above. The main product of their estates was wool with an average output of 35 sacks per year in the 14th century. In spite of the community, fairly large income compared to other Gilbertine houses, the costs of the hospital continually threatened to overwhelm income. For this reason the community had the right to send out collectors and Bishop John Dalderby granted an Indulgence for all donations to Saint Sepulchre's Hospital.

The house was dissolved on 14 July 1538, two months before the other Gilbertine houses in the county. The thirteen canons were pensioned, but the lay sisters got nothing.

The site of the priory church is now home to the parish church for the St Catherine's area of Lincoln.

== Queen Eleanor of Castile ==
On the night of 2 December 1290 the body of Queen Eleanor of Castile, wife of King Edward the First, rested at the Priory of Saint Katherine on the first of twelve days journey to Westminster Abbey. The following year, the King had Commemorative Crosses built at each location on the journey including outside the gatehouse of St Katherine's. Eleanor's viscera were entombed at Lincoln Cathedral, so it is likely that the embalming process happened at the priory given the expertise available due to St Sepulchre's medical practice.

== Priors ==
- Adam, occurs 1164
- Gilbert, 1202–1218
- William, 1218–1225
- Vivian, 1225–1232
- Hugh, 1232–1236
- Roger, 1236–1245
- Ralph, 1245–1269
- Henry, 1269–
- Gilbert, occurs 1323
- William, 1333–1334
- Richard de Stretton, 1334–1334
- Walter de Shireburn, 1334–1340
- Robert de Navenby, 1340–1344
- William, 1344–1348
- Roger de Houton, 1348–1390
- Hamo, 1390–
- Walter Iklyngham, occurs 1428 and 1435
- Richard Misyn, 1435–1447
- John Busseby, 1447–
- Robert, occurs 1511
- John Jonson, occurs 1522
- Robert Holgate, occurs 1529
- William Griffiths, occurs 1538

== Sources ==
- Page, William, ed. (1906). "Houses of the Gilbertine order: the priory of St Catherine outside Lincoln". A History of the County of Lincoln. Victoria County History. Vol. 2. London. pp. 188–191 – via British History Online.
