= Bracebridge, Lincolnshire =

Suburb of Lincoln in Lincolnshire, England

Coordinates: 53.207225°N 0.550189°W

Bracebridge
- Suburb
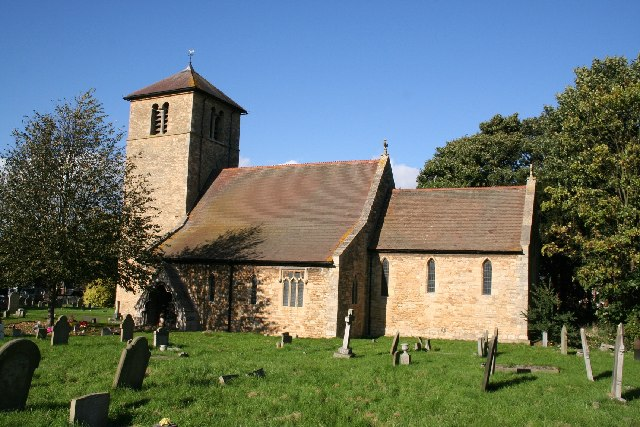
- All Saints Church

- Location within Lincolnshire
- OS grid reference: SK969687
  - London: 115 mi (185 km) S
- District: Lincoln
- Shire county: Lincolnshire
- Region: East Midlands
- Country: England
- Sovereign state: United Kingdom
- Post town: Lincoln
- Postcode district: LN5
- Police: Lincolnshire
- Fire: Lincolnshire
- Ambulance: East Midlands
- UK Parliament: Lincoln

Bracebridge is a suburb of Lincoln, Lincolnshire, England. It is situated approximately 2 miles (3 km) south from the city centre on the main A1434 Newark Road, stretching approximately from St Catherine's to Swallowbeck alongside the east bank of the River Witham, and the village of Bracebridge Heath.

In 1911 the civil parish had a population of 2281. On 9 November 1920 the parish was abolished and merged with Lincoln.

Under the Local Government Act 1888 Bracebridge was part of Kesteven and considered a separate town within that county. The Local Government Act 1894 changed Bracebridge's status to an Urban District within Lincoln in the county of Lindsey. Bracebridge now falls under the City of Lincoln Council, within the county of Lincolnshire.

Bracebridge was formerly served by the now-defunct Bracebridge railway station which was located to the rear of the Manse estate which is accessible from Brant Road. Bracebridge Low Fields is a suburb between Waddington to the south and St. Catherines. Both Bracebridge and Bracebridge Heath are served by regular bus services. All Saints' Church dates from the 11th century, but was remodelled in 1875 by J. L. Pearson. It was further restored in 1895 and the 20th century and is a Grade I listed building.
