= St. Catherine's Church, Bucharest =

Heritage site in Bucharest, Romania

Coordinates: 44°25′28″N 26°06′06″E

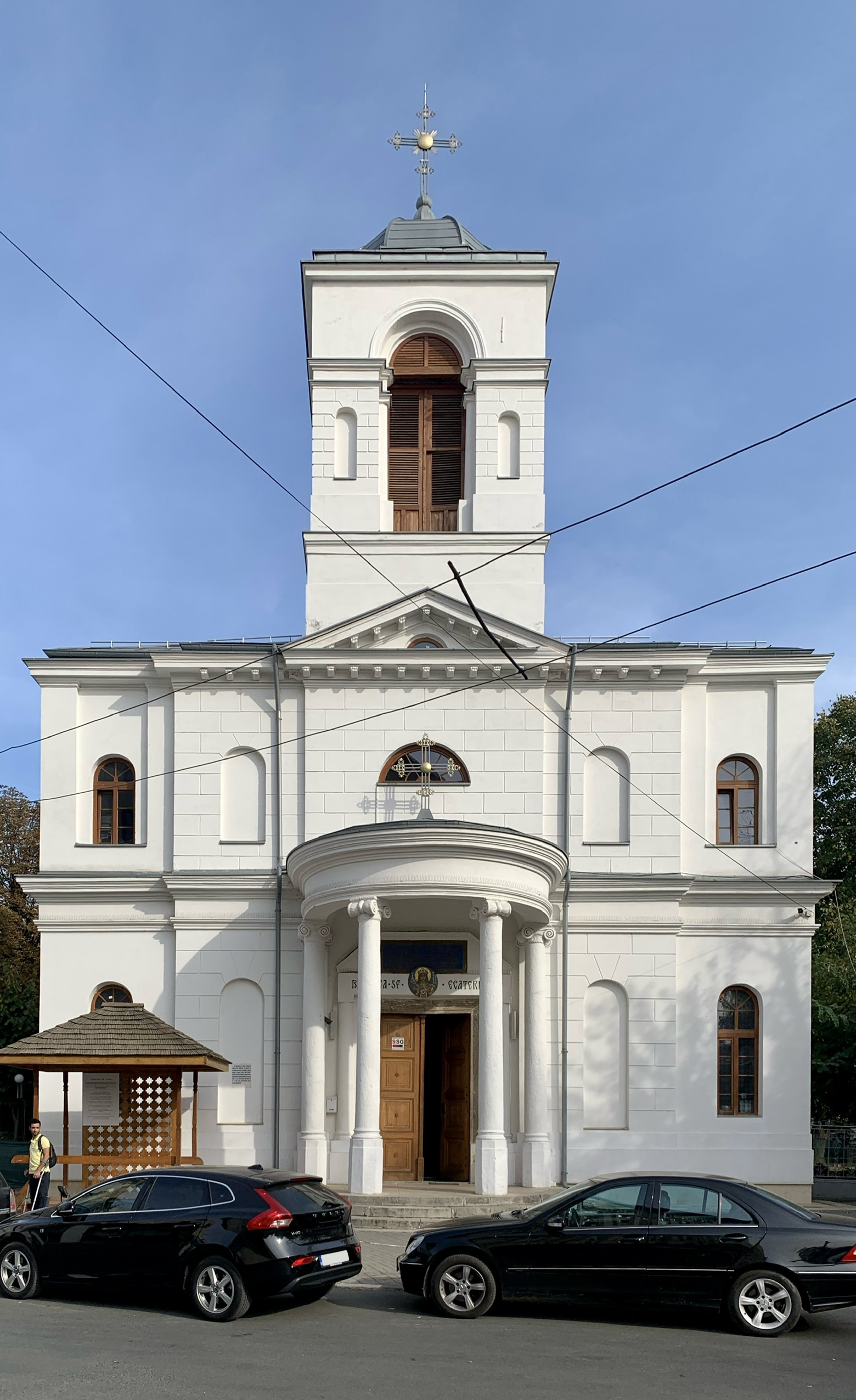
The church in October 2022

St. Catherine's Church (Romanian: Biserica Sfânta Ecaterina) is a Romanian Orthodox church located at 5 Sfânta Ecaterina Street in Bucharest, Romania. It is dedicated to Saint Catherine of Alexandria.

The church is located on the site of a monastery church established by Ivașco Golescu, who served as High Vornic from 1574 to 1583. The monastery, first mentioned in a document of 1589, was subservient to Saint Catherine's Monastery on the Sinai Peninsula. It was repaired in 1595, following the retreat of the Ottoman troops under Koca Sinan Pasha, by Vistier (treasurer) Pană, who thus became a second ktetor. Nearby, in 1775–1782, Lady Ecaterina Ipsilanti built an inn, later burned and finally demolished in 1862; this circumstance gave rise to the erroneous notion that she founded the monastery.

The church was burned by the troops of Gabriel Báthory in 1611 and again repaired by the founders’ descendants. By 1813, the monastery featured large houses for its officials and many annexes. An 1836 inventory records that the church was made of masonry, with two wooden domes, and was covered in wooden beams. The 1838 earthquake cracked the ceilings, which were repaired. By 1849, it lay in ruins, and was demolished to the foundations the following year, without approval from the Metropolis. According to the pisanie, the current church was completed in 1852, and henceforth served as a lay parish. It was painted by Constantin Lecca and Mișu Popp. The iconostasis art was painted on canvas at Sinai, then transferred to wood. Repairs took place in 1899, 1909, and 1923.

The church is 31.3 meters long by 10–16 meters wide. It is cross-shaped, with large semi-circular apses. The very small octagonal spire sits atop the nave, while the bell tower is square; each of the latter’s four sides has a closed arch with a large window. The semicircular portico features an entablature resting on four Ionic columns. Above the simple portal are the pisanie in Romanian Cyrillic and the icon of the patron saint. The simple Neoclassical facades have pilasters on the lower half, divided from the upper by a string course. The interior walls are decorated in Baroque style, with pilasters and composite capitals. The arches are covered in decorative paintings, while the ceilings are covered in icons of saints. The large rectangular windows have simple bars on the exterior.

The church is listed as a historic monument by Romania's Ministry of Culture and Religious Affairs. Also listed is the 1911 bust of educator Barbu Constantinescu, located on the grounds. The church serves as a chapel for the Theology Faculty of the University of Bucharest.
