= St. Catherine's Lutheran Church, Riga =

St. Catherine's Lutheran Church
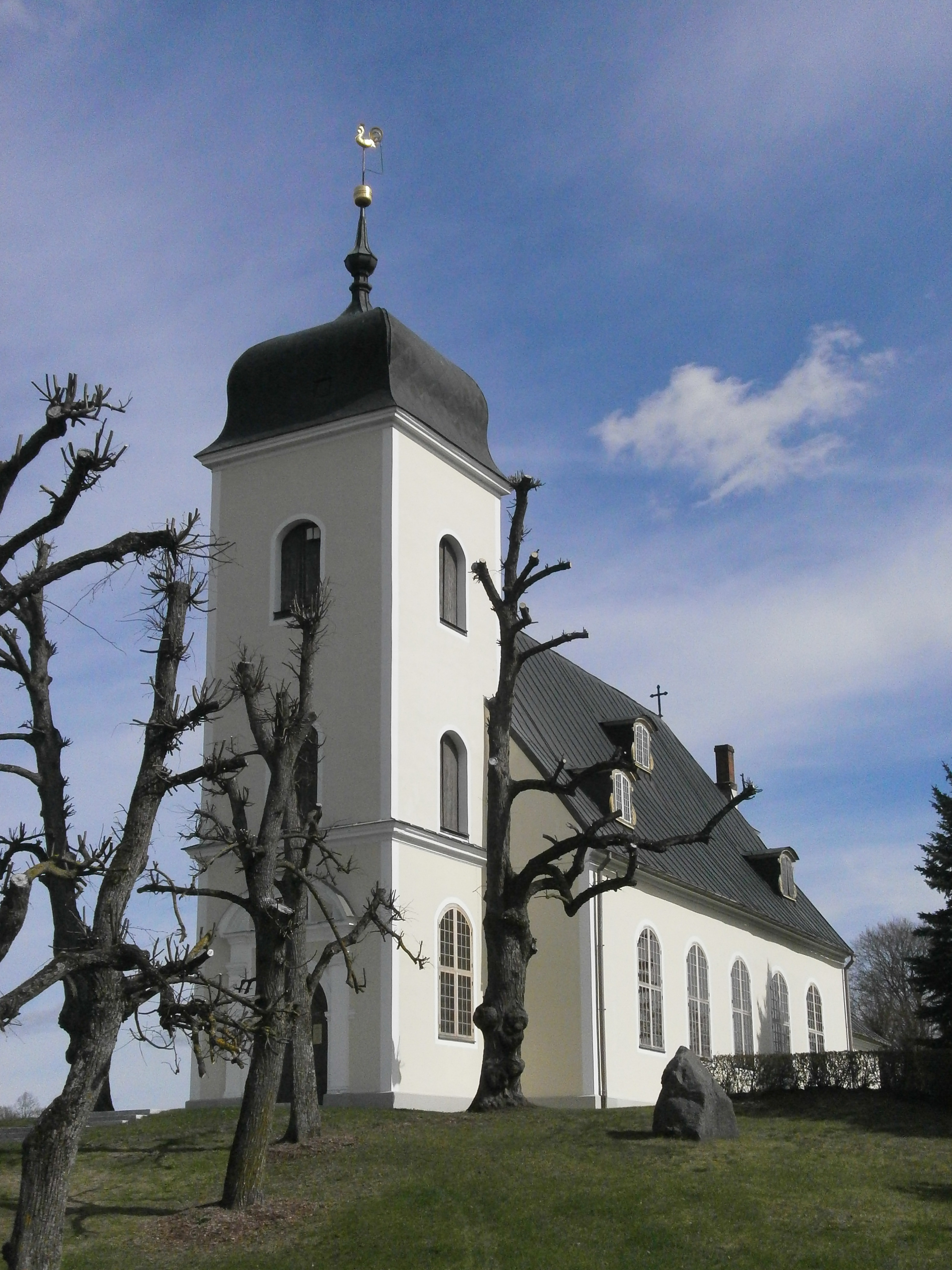

- Location within Latvia Riga metropolitan
- 56°57′28.49″N 24°14′57.72″E
- Location: Riga
- Country: Latvia
- Denomination: Lutheran

St. Catherine's Lutheran Church (Latvian: Svētās Katrīnas evaņģēliski luteriskā baznīca), also known as Biķeri or Biķernieki church for its location, is a Lutheran church in Riga, the capital of Latvia. It is a parish church of the Evangelical Lutheran Church of Latvia. The church is situated at the address 59 Vecā Biķernieku Street.
