= St Katherine Westway =

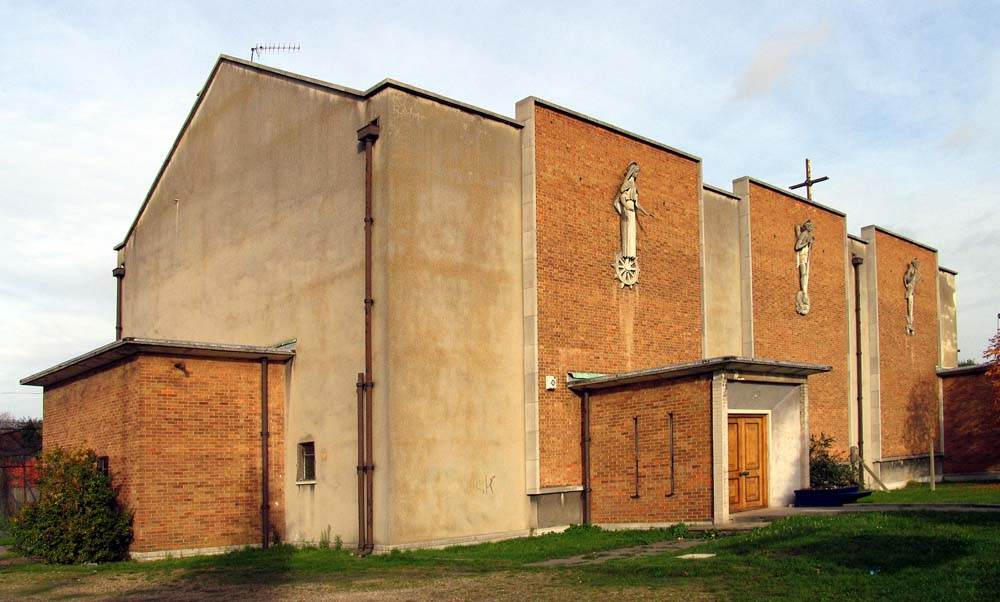
- The present church.
- St Katherine Westway
- 51°30′52.5312″N 0°14′34.9548″W
- Location: Hammersmith, west London
- Country: England
- Denomination: Church of England
- Website: www.stkatherineswestway.org

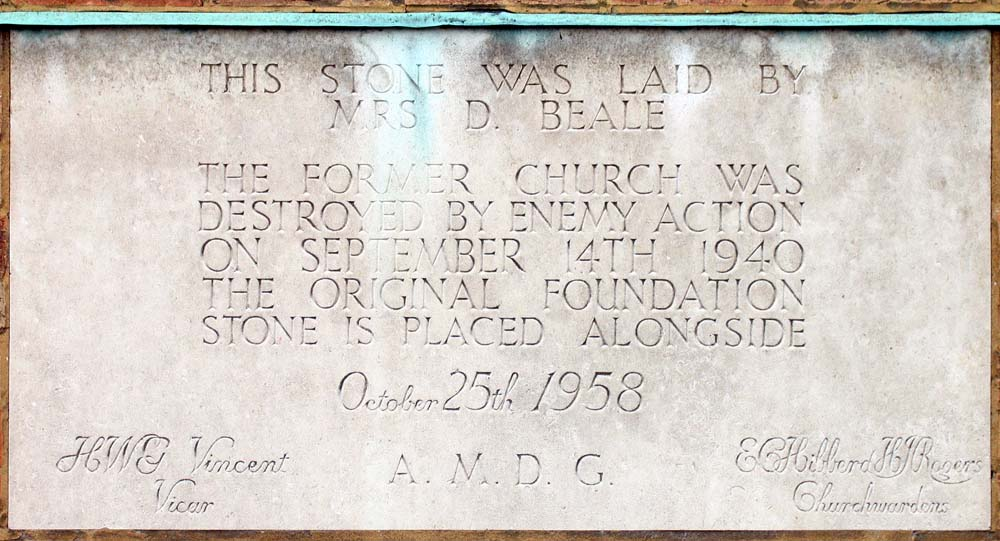
Foundation stone of the second church.

St Katherine Westway is a Church of England parish church in Hammersmith, west London. Its original dedication was St Catherine Coleman, named after the church of St Katherine Coleman in the City of London, whose sale funded its construction in 1922, to a design by Robert Atkinson - it was assigned a parish in 1929. Westway refers to Westway, the road beside which it stands. The original church was destroyed by bombing on 14 September 1940 and the foundation stone for the present one was laid on 25 October 1958.
