= St. Catherine's Roman Catholic Church, Riga =

Church in Riga, Latvia

Coordinates: 56.9492°N 24.1073°E

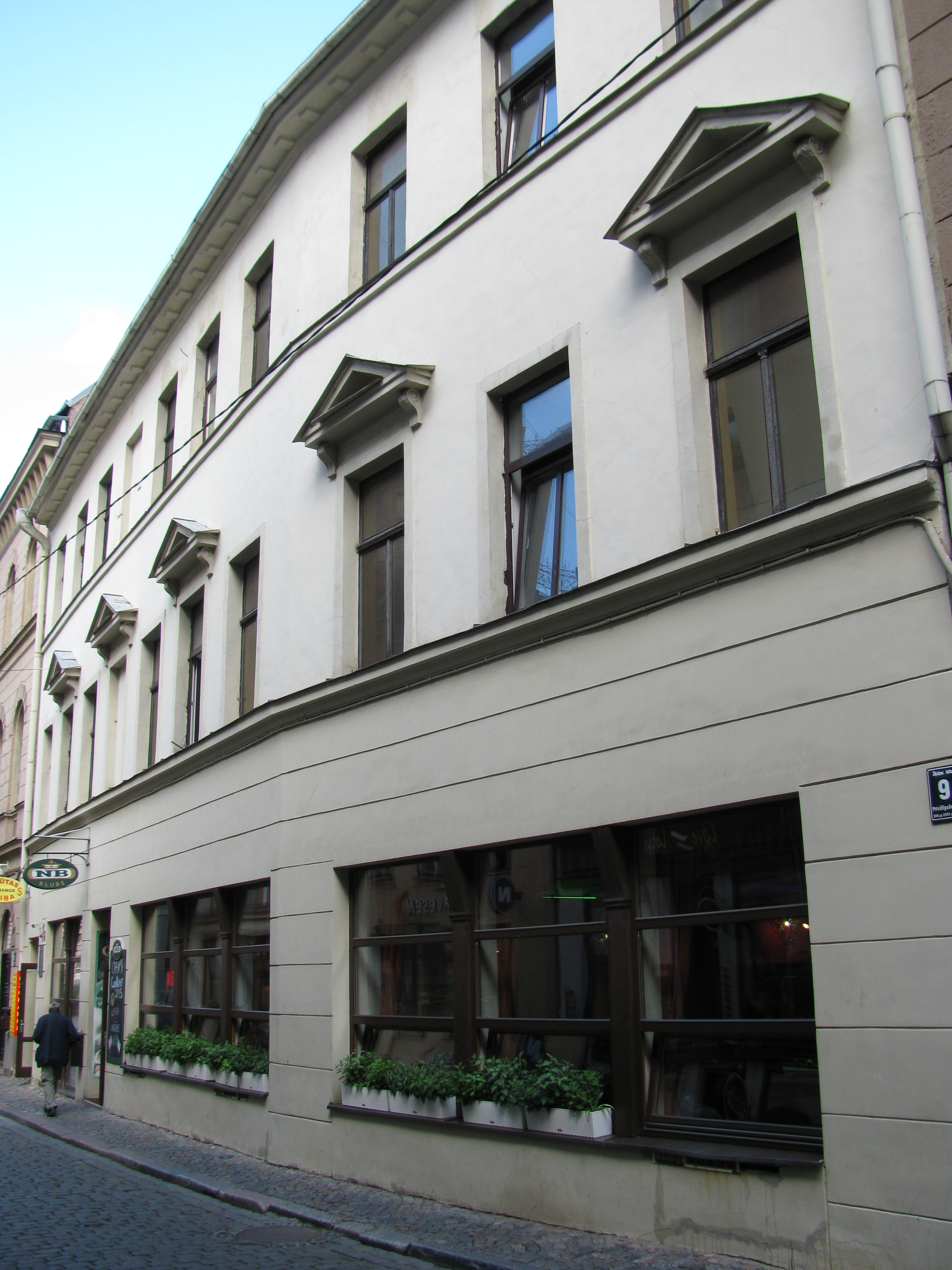
Šķūņu iela 9 2015-09-09.JPG

St. Catherine's Roman Catholic Church (Latvian: Svētās Katrīnas Romas katoļu baznīca) was a catholic church in Riga, the capital of Latvia. The church was situated at the address 9/11 Šķūņu Street.
