= St Katherine's Church, Lincoln =

Southside
- St Katherine's Church, Lincoln
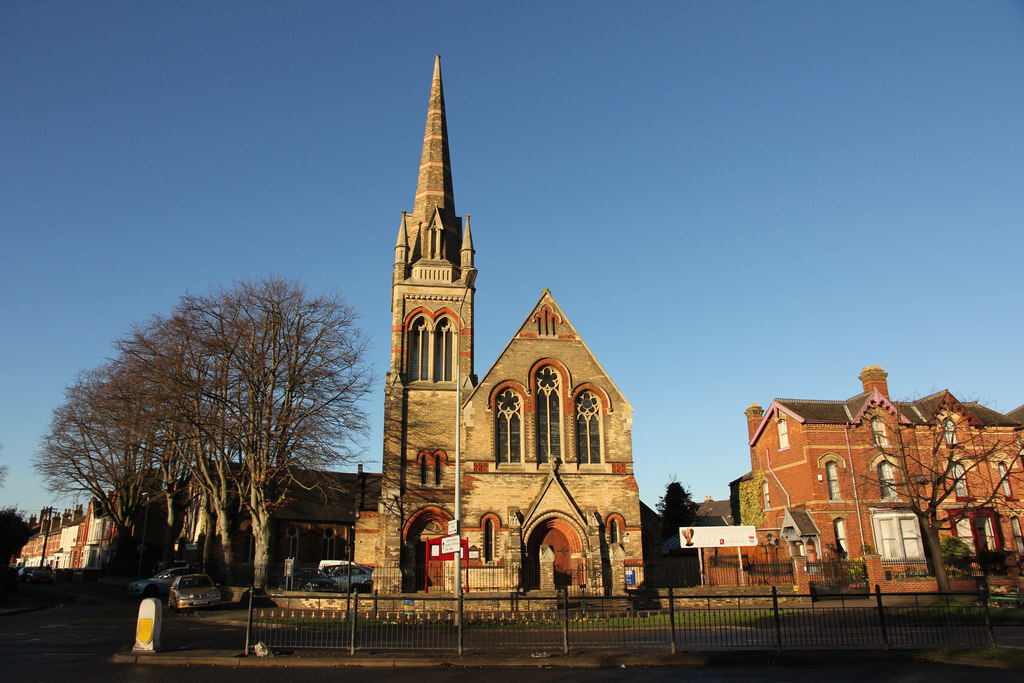
- St Katherine's Church, now in use as Southside
- Southside
- 53.2142°N 0.5466°W
- OS grid reference: SK 97129 69559
- Location: Lincoln, Lincolnshire
- Country: England
- Previous denomination: Methodist
- Website: www.southsidelincs.com

History
- Former name(s): St Katherine's Church, Lincoln
- Status: Redundant, now in use for non-religious purposes

Architecture
- Functional status: Redundant Parish Church
- Heritage designation: Grade II listed
- Designated: 1973
- Architect(s): Charles Bell (church and school) and Withers & Meredith (tower and spire)
- Groundbreaking: 1881
- Completed: 1887
- Closed: 1982

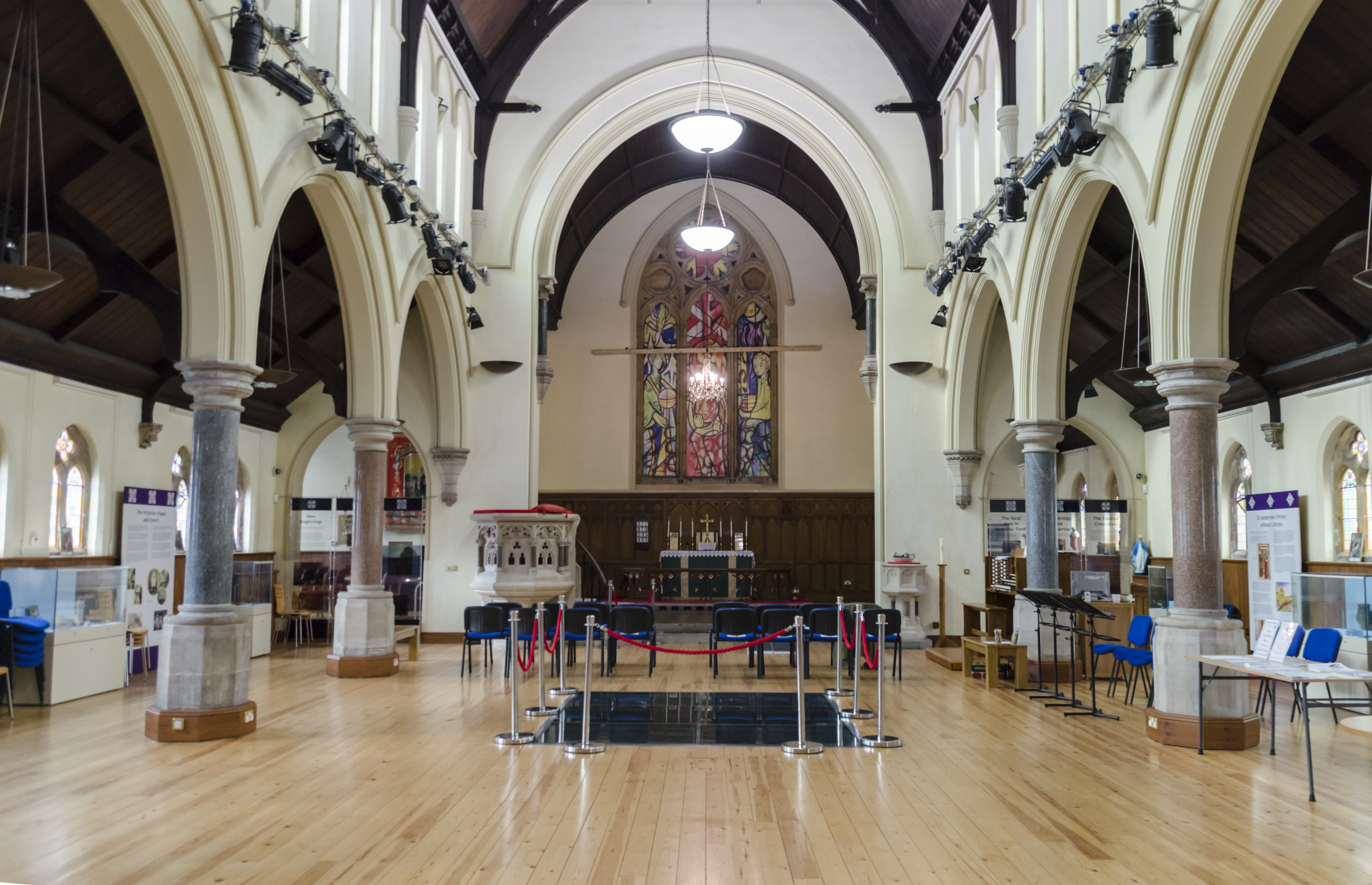
Interior of St Katherines Church

St Katherine's Church, Lincoln also known as "Southside" and "St Katherine's Cathedral Church" is a Grade II-listed former church in Lincoln, Lincolnshire, England. It is a former Methodist church in the Boultham and St Catherine's areas of the city. It was first opened in 1887 with the tower and spire being added later. Designed for a large congregation, the church could seat 600 people. Pevsner records the architect of the church as being Charles Bell. During its use as a place of worship, it was dubbed "Lincoln's second cathedral", (after the much older and larger cathedral in the city centre). It is a Grade II listed building.

The church was declared redundant in 1982 and was then reused for a DIY warehouse before being left vacated. Now it is in use for a community venue and commercial centre as "Southside".

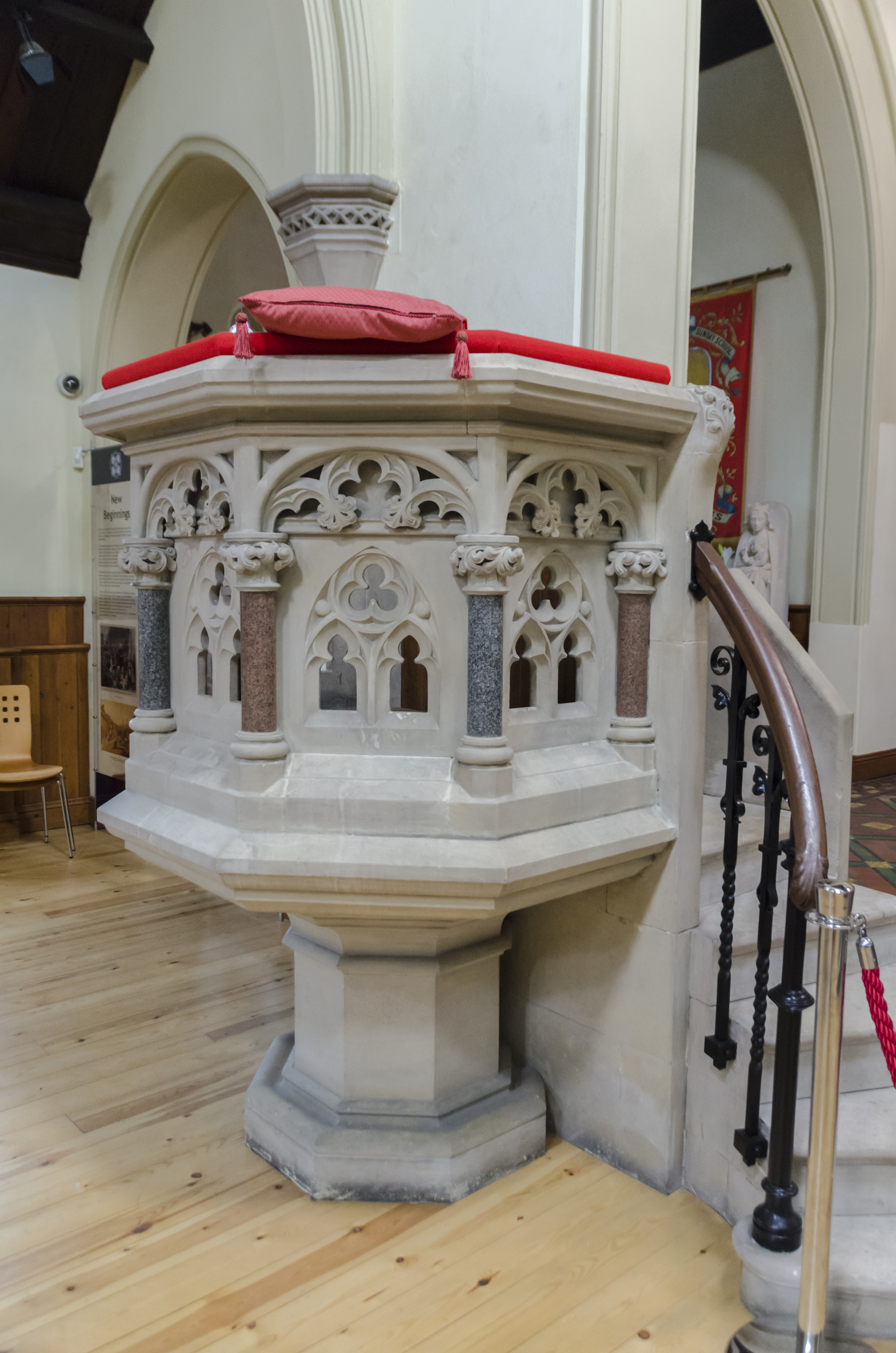
Pulpit inside the church

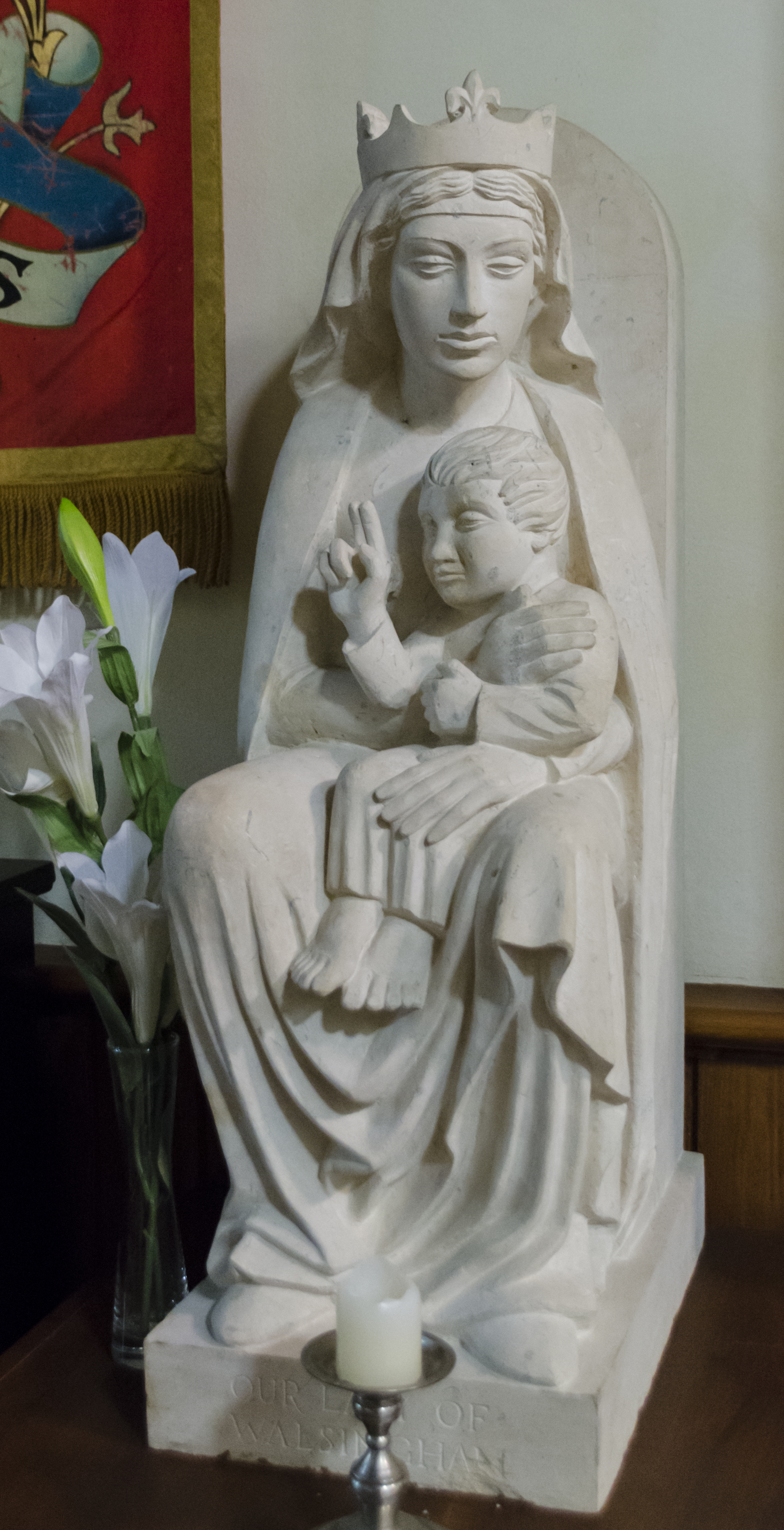
A madonna and child statue inside the church

== Sources ==
- Pevsner, Nikolaus; Harris, John; Antram, Nicholas (2002). Lincolnshire. The Buildings of England. New Haven, US and London: Yale University Press. ISBN 0-300-09620-8.
