= St Katherine Coleman =

Former church-site in London

Coordinates: 51.51167°N 0.07881°W

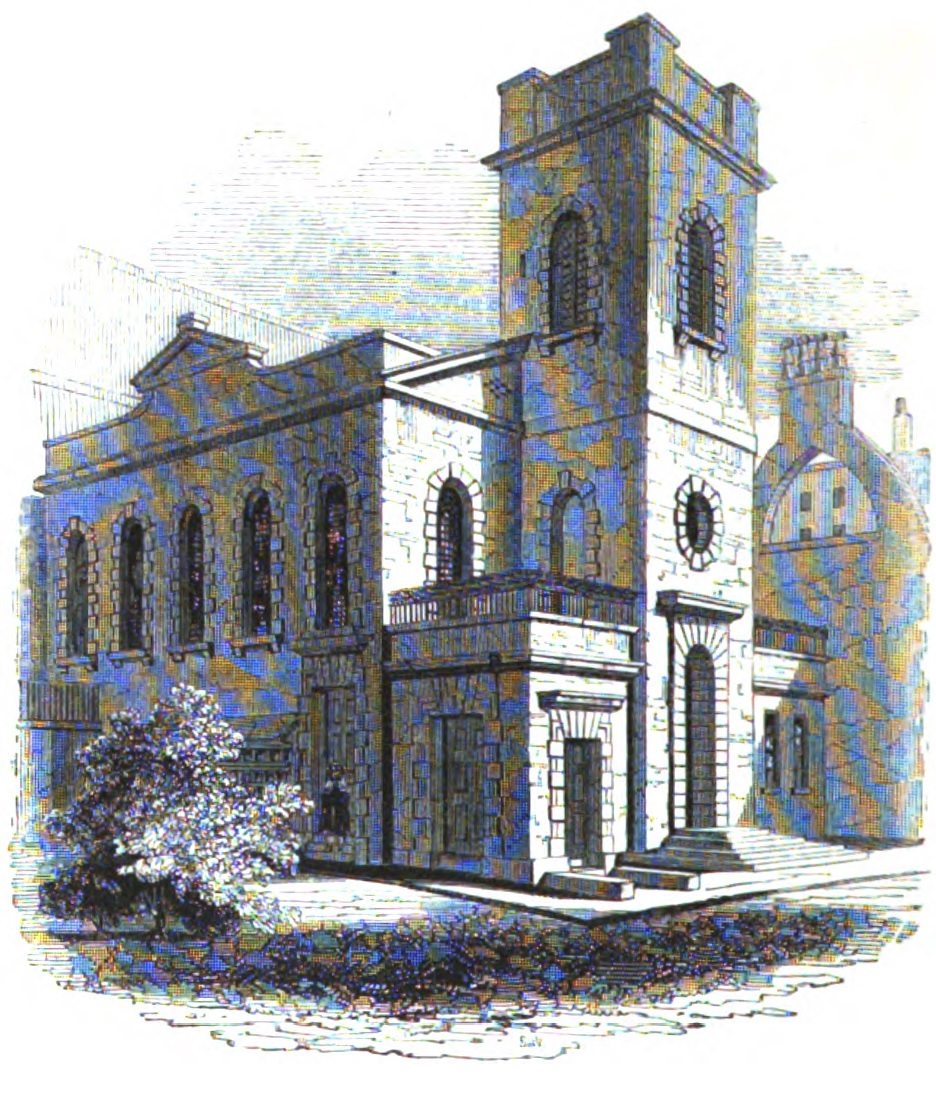
- St Katherine Coleman
- Location: Church Row, London
- Country: England
- Denomination: Anglican

Architecture
- Architect: James Horne
- Style: Palladian
- Years built: 1741
- Demolished: 1926

St Katherine Coleman was a parish church in the City of London, situated in St Katherine's Row, on the south side of Fenchurch Street, in Aldgate Ward. Of medieval origin, it narrowly escaped destruction in the Great Fire of London in 1666, but was rebuilt in the eighteenth century. The church closed in November 1926 and was demolished soon afterwards.

== Dedication ==
The church was dedicated to St Catherine of Alexandria. The additional name "Coleman" was taken from nearby garden called "Colemanhaw". St Katherine's was known earlier as "All Hallows Coleman-church."

== History ==
=== Medieval church ===
The church was in existence by 1346, when the name of a rector is recorded. In about 1489, William White, then Lord Mayor, rebuilt or added the south aisle. There were repairs in 1620, and in 1624 a new gallery was constructed and a vestry added. There were further repairs in 1703. As described by Edward Hatton in 1708, the church was 66 feet (20 m) long, 36 feet (11 m) wide and 23 feet (7.0 m) ft high. There was a brick and stone tower about 60 feet (18 m) high, with three bells. Hatton describes the architecture of the church as being "of the Gothic and Tuscan orders".

=== Eighteenth-century rebuilding ===
Saint Catherine Coleman Act 1738
- Act of Parliament
- Parliament of Great Britain
- Long title: An Act to enable the Parishioners of the Parish of Saint Catherine Coleman, in Fenchurch Street, in the City of London, to re-build the Church of the said Parish.
- Citation: 12 Geo. 2. c. 17
- Territorial extent: Great Britain

Dates
- Royal assent: 13 June 1739
- Commencement: 1 February 1739 (Note: Start of session.)
- Repealed: 31 January 2013
Other legislation
Amended by	Saint Catherine Coleman Act 1741
Repealed by	Statute Law (Repeals) Act 2013

Status: Repealed

Text of statute as originally enacted

Saint Catherine Coleman Act 1741
- Act of Parliament
- Parliament of Great Britain
- Long title: An Act to explain and amend an Act passed in the Twelfth Year of His present Majesty's Reign, intituled, "An Act to enable the Parishioners of Saint Catherine Coleman, in Fenchurch Street, in the City of London, to re-build the Church of the said Parish;" and for making the said Act more effectual for the Purposes thereby intended.
- Citation: 15 Geo. 2. c. 12
- Territorial extent: Great Britain

Dates
- Royal assent: 15 April 1742
- Commencement: 1 December 1741
- Repealed: 31 January 2013
Other legislation
Amends	Saint Catherine Coleman Act 1738
Repealed by	Statute Law (Repeals) Act 2013

Status: Repealed

Text of statute as originally enacted

St Katherine's was demolished in 1734, and rebuilt in 1741 at the expense of the parish, to a "vernacular palladian" design by James Horne. Never regarded as one of the more spectacular City churches, the new building was constructed of brick, with window and door surrounds of rusticated stonework. The interior was a plain room, with a flat ceiling, coved at the sides, ornamented with a single oval panel, with a flower at the centre. An arched recess at the east end accommodated the reredos. Beneath the church was a burial vault, entered through a door at the west end.

=== Demolition ===
The parish was designated for amalgamation under the Union of Benefices Act 1860 but the church remained in use until 1926. The final service was held on 20 November, a joyous occasion (as reported in the City Press) after which it was quickly demolished. The gate piers and railings of the churchyard, which probably date from the 18th century survive, and the site of the churchyard itself is now a public garden, owned by Lloyd's Register. It was re-landscaped in 1996–2000. After the clearance of the graveyard, the burials were reinhumed at City of London Cemetery.

Money raised by the sale of the site was used to erect a new church in Hammersmith, initially called St Catherine Coleman, but now known as St Katherine Westway. The marble font from the City church is now at St Peter's, Grange Park, Enfield.
