= Church of St. Catherine, Dnipro =

Evangelical Lutheran church in Ukraine

Church of St. Catherine
- Evangelical Lutheran Church of St. Catherine
- Кірха Святої Катерини
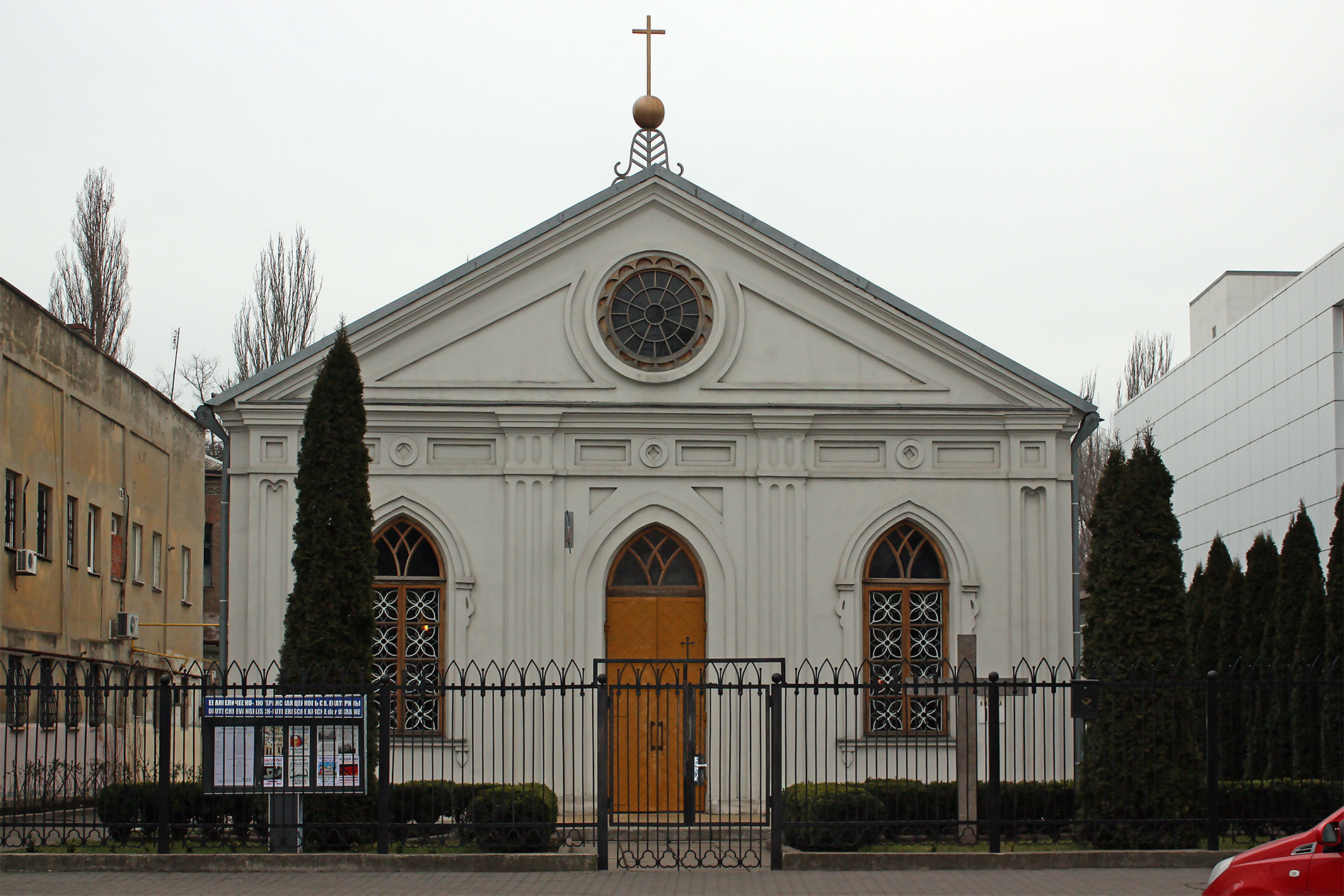
- The church in 2016
- Church of St. Catherine
- 48°28′23″N 35°01′38″E
- Location: Dnipro
- Address: 103 Dmytro Yavornytsky Avenue
- Country: Ukraine
- Denomination: Evangelical Lutheran

History
- Status: Active
- Founded: 1852
- Dedication: Catherine I
- Consecrated: 1866

Architecture
- Functional status: Church
- Architectural type: Gothic
- Years built: 1865–1866
- Completed: 1866

Administration
- Archdiocese: German Evangelical-Lutheran Church in Ukraine

Clergy
- Pastor: Oleg Gnedovsky

The Church of St. Catherine (Ukrainian: Кірха Святої Катерини, romanized: Kirkha Sviatoi Kateryny) is a 19th-century Evangelical Lutheran church of the German Evangelical-Lutheran Church in Ukraine (GELCU) in Dnipro, Ukraine. It is also called the Evangelical Lutheran Church of St. Catherine. It was the first church to be opened in independent Ukraine. It is located on Dmytro Yavornytsky Avenue, next to the Maxim Gorki Theater and Lazar Hloba Park.

== Design ==
The church was built in the style of early Gothic architecture, with late Baroque features to enhance its appeal. Its current interior design is opulent, with altar pieces such as crucifixes, icons, plaster statues of saints, items of devotion, and books. Images from evangelical life are painted on the church's walls and ceilings.

== History ==
Early in the development of the German community in the second half of the 18th century, the first Lutheran evangelists relocated to the settlement in the Katerynoslav Oblast. The oldest Lutheran village dates back to 1789 and was known as Josefstal. It is located in what is now the Dnipro Oblast of Samarivka, and it was about 12 kilometres (7.5 mi) from Katerynoslav.

Funded by the city's German Lutheran population, the Evangelical Lutheran Church of St. Catherine was founded in Katerynoslav (present day Dnipro) in 1852. In 1861, a plot of land was bought to construct a church. The actual building process started in 1865, and it was consecrated in 1866. At the building, a Lutheran charity for impoverished people and a school were also established.

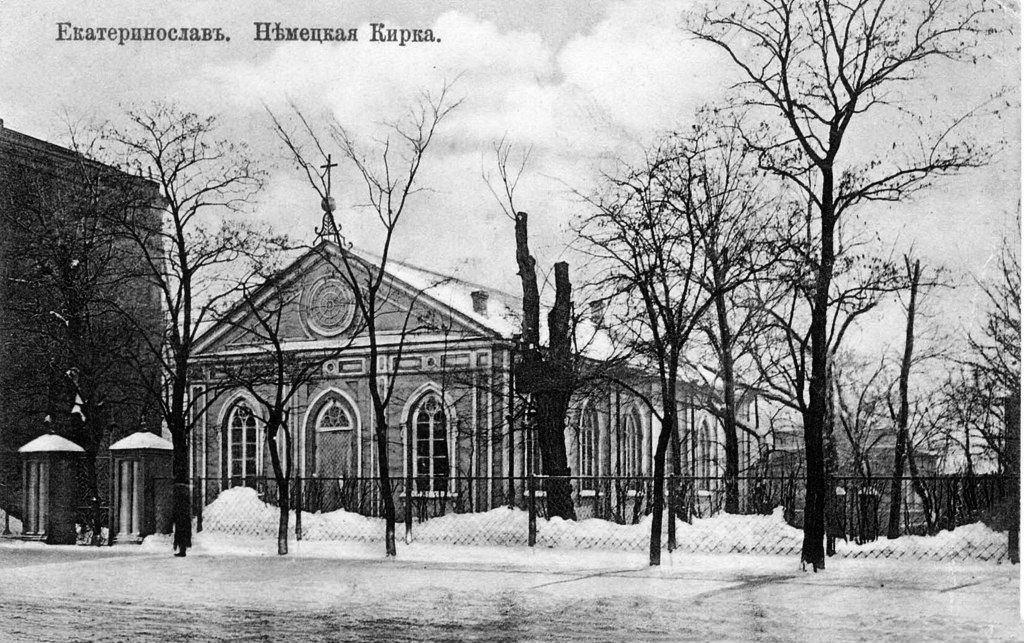
The church in early 20th century

The neighborhood helped to reopen it after the city officials had shuttered its operation several times. The church continued to function for 50 years, closing its doors in 1933 due to the USSR anti-religious campaign, with the school closing its doors in 1938.

This building was then converted into an archive and library for foreign book collection during the Soviet era. It was then abandoned for a long time, and following examination, the church was declared to be in an emergency situation. It was given to the Dnipropetrovsk Revival Society in 1990, and they began a comprehensive restoration of the church. Munich and Dnipropetrovsk architects created the repair plan. Church services restarted in 1991, allowed the Lutheran community in Dnipro to resume its operations.

Igor Yermolaev served as the first pastor of the reopened church until 1994, when Gotthald Hyunke took over. By 24 October 1994, the church was fully restored and refurbished, and it was formally reopened. Igor Taranenko was the priest from 1996 until 2009. Serhii Mashevskyi, who was elected bishop of the German Evangelical-Lutheran Church in Ukraine in 2013, served from 2008 to 2013.

== Gallery ==
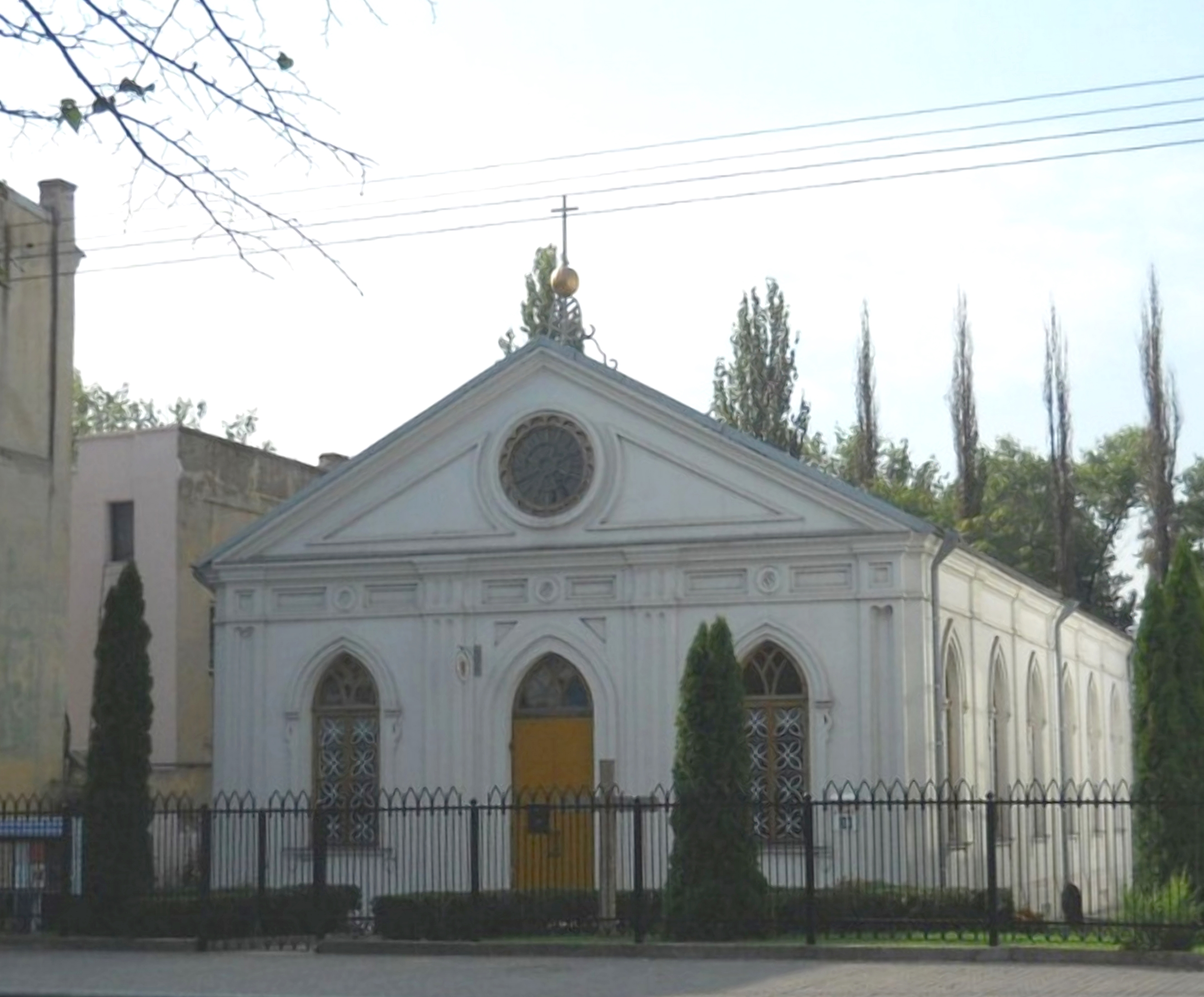
The church in 2012

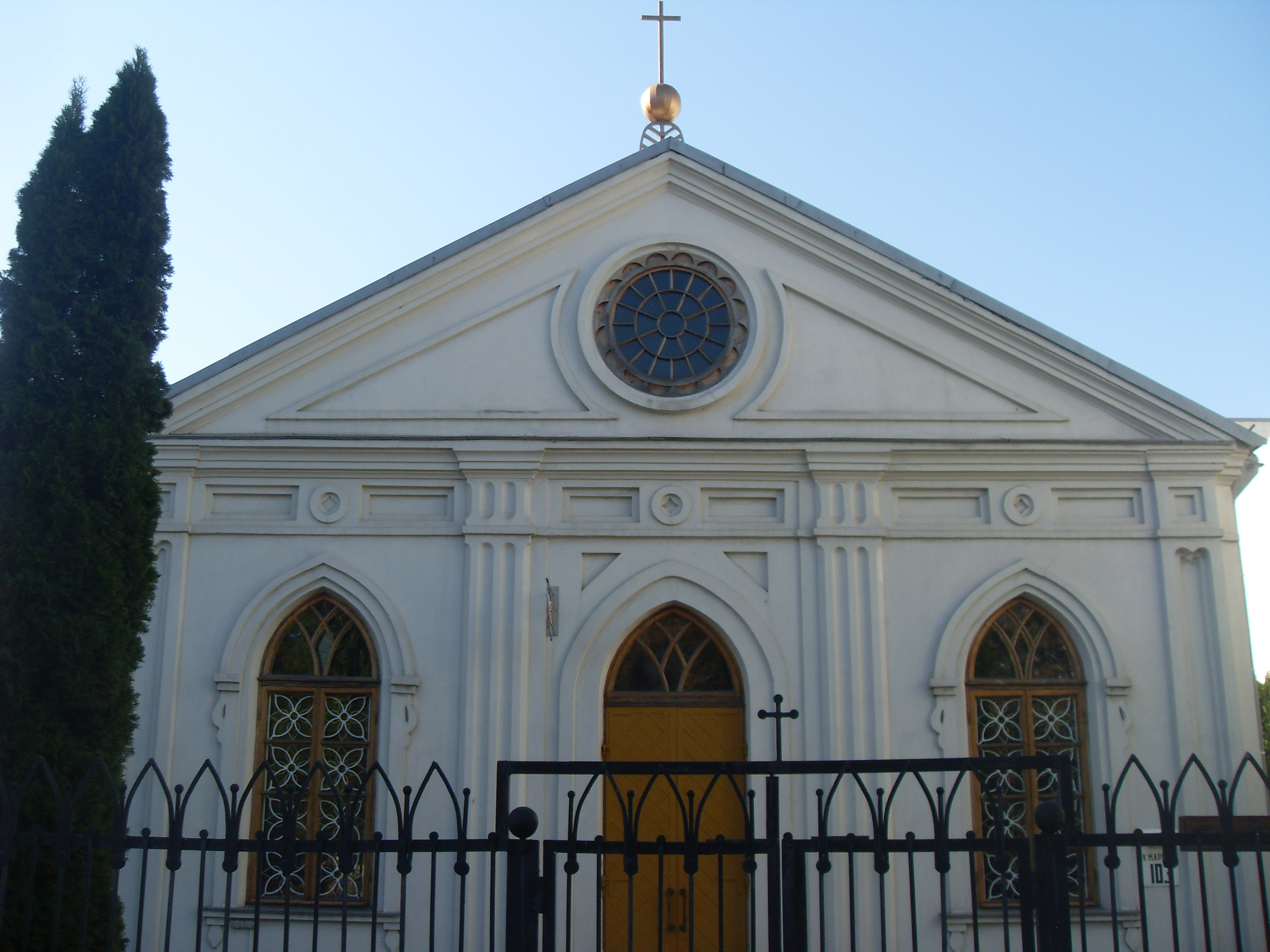
The church in 2015

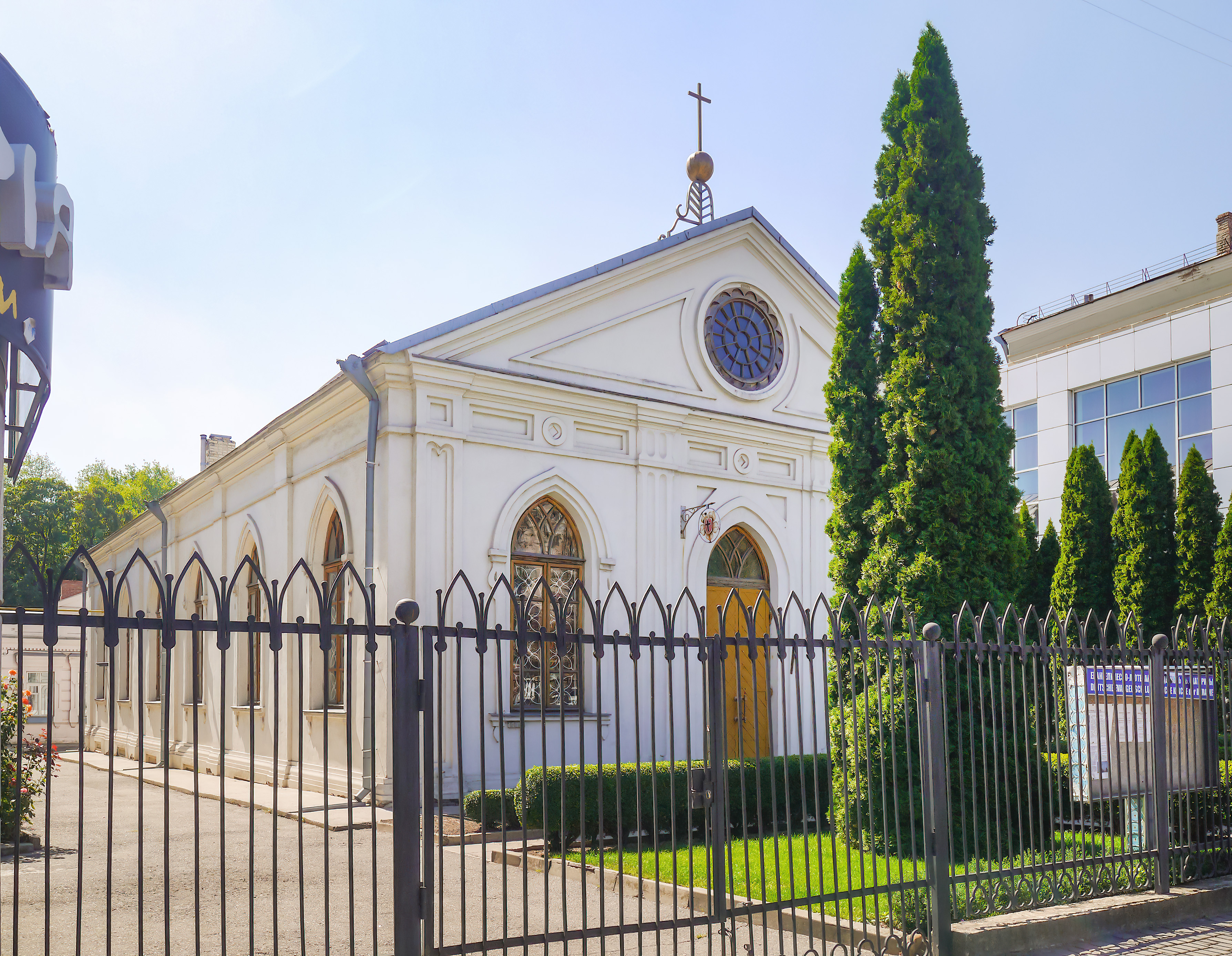
The church in 2020

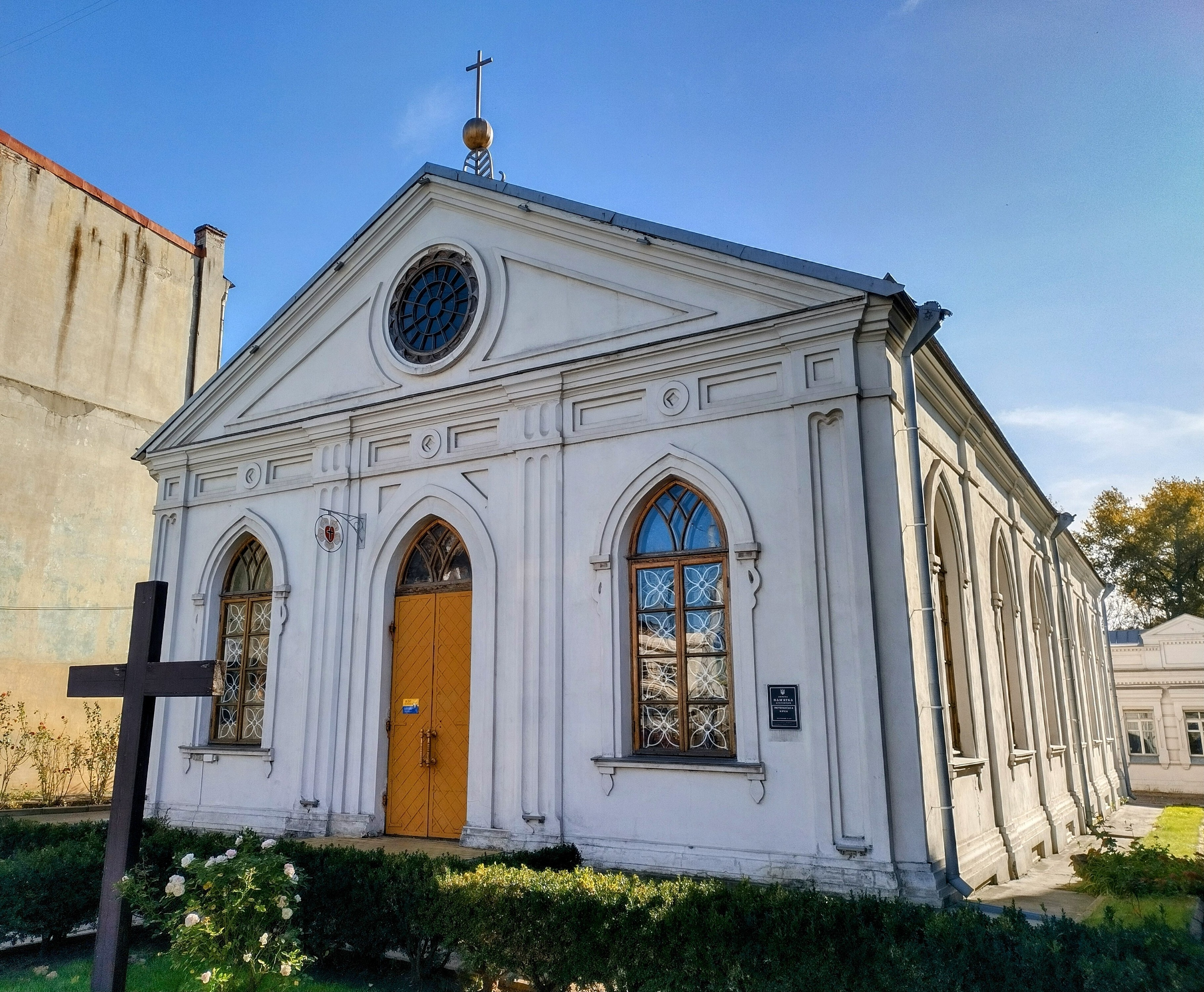
The church in 2023
