= St. Catherine University (Japan) =

Coordinates: 33°58′31.7″N 132°46′54.1″E

St. Catherine's University
- 聖カタリナ大学
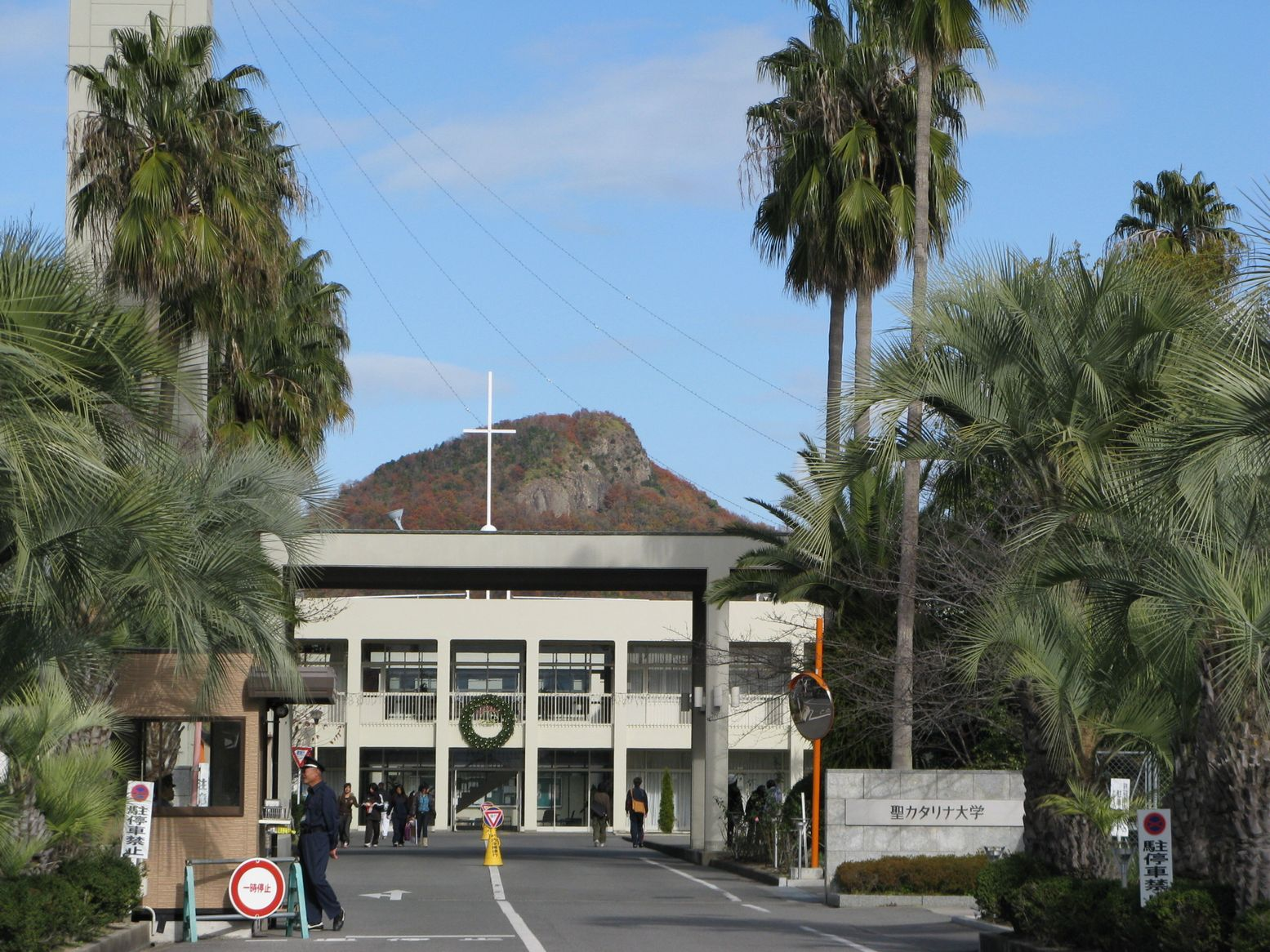
- St. Catherine's University
- Type: Private
- Established: 1988
- President: Jovino San Miguel
- Location: Matsuyama, Ehime, Japan
- Website: Official website

St. Catherine University (聖カタリナ大学, Sei katarina daigaku) is a private university in Matsuyama, Ehime, Japan. It was established first as a women's junior college in 1966 and became a women's four-year university in 1988. It became a co-educational university in 2004. St. Catherine Junior College is attached to the university.

== Organization ==
- Department of Social Work
- Department of Health and Welfare Management
- Department of Human and Social Sciences

In addition, St. Catherine Junior College's Department of Early Childhood Education and Care awards licenses and certifications to become a pre-school teacher, a nursery school teacher, a recreation instructor, or a social work officer.
