= Church of Saint Catherine of Alexandria =

Church in Nitra Region, Slovakia

Coordinates: 48°25′18″N 18°24′34″E

The Church of Saint Catherine of Alexandria is located in Slovakia, in the village Topoľčianky. Location of Topoľčianky is middle west Slovakia. It is 30 km away from the city of Nitra.

== History ==
The church was built by comte Karol Keglevich. The architect for the main project was Melchior Hefele, who also designed the palace in the capital city of Bratislava. Construction of the church started in 1776 and it was finished in 1784. It is dedicated to Saint Catherine of Alexandria. A painting of her is placed above the main altar. This church is built in classic-baroque style. It is often sought out by local and foreign tourists especially on the saint's day.
