= Royal Chapel of St Katherine-upon-the-Hoe =

St Katherine-upon-the-Hoe
- Royal Chapel of St Katherine-upon-the-Hoe
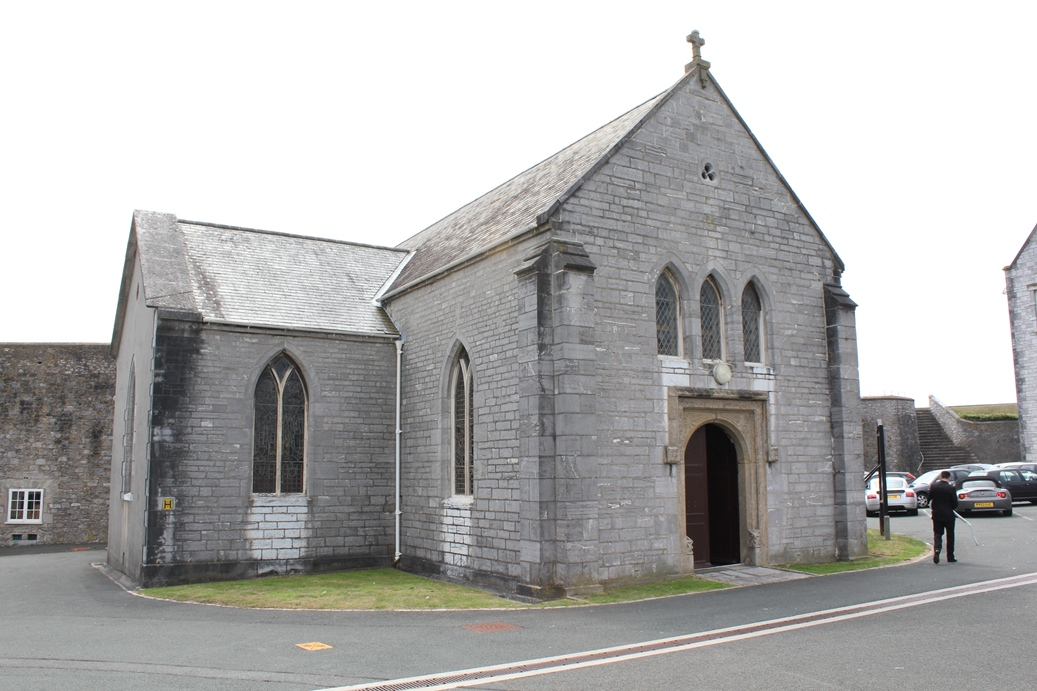
- St Katherine-upon-the-Hoe
- 50.3640°N 4.1375°W
- OS grid reference: SX 48067 53752
- Location: Royal Citadel, Plymouth
- Country: England
- Denomination: Church of England

History
- Founded: 1371

The Royal Chapel of St Katherine-upon-the-Hoe is the garrison church within the precincts of the Royal Citadel in Plymouth. The original church on the site was licensed for services by the Bishop of Exeter, Thomas de Brantingham, in 1371. During the period 1666–1671, the original building was demolished and the present nave, chancel and sanctuary were rebuilt on the same site. The galleries and transepts were added in 1845 and give a symmetrical cross-like structure to the building.

King George V re-granted the title Royal Chapel in 1927 during a visit to the Royal Citadel.

It is the Garrison Church to the Royal Artillery and 29 Commando in Plymouth, and is a Grade II listed building.
