= St. Katherine's Chapel =

- U.S. National Register of Historic Places
- Michigan State Historic Site
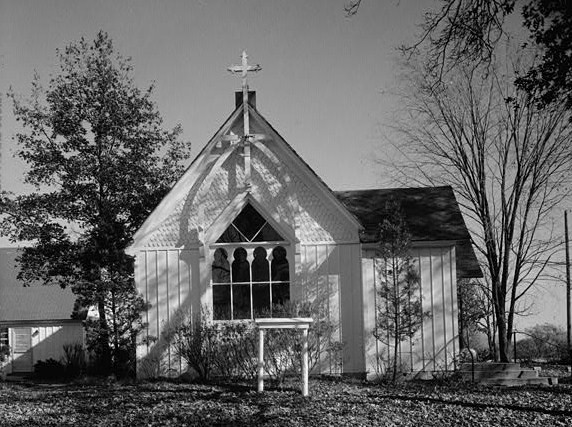

- Location within Michigan Location within the United States
- Interactive map
- Nearest city: 4650 N. Meridian Rd, Williamston, Michigan
- Coordinates: 42°43′7″N 84°21′43″W
- Area: 9 acres (3.6 ha)
- Built: 1887
- Architect: John Harris Forster
- Architectural style: Carpenter Gothic
- NRHP reference No.: 70000272
- Added to NRHP: July 8, 1970

St. Katherine's Chapel, also known as St. Katherine's Episcopal Chapel, is an historic Episcopal church building located at 4650 North Meridian Road in Williamston Township, near Williamston, Michigan, United States.

== History ==
St. Katherine's Chapel was built in 1887 by John Harris Forster in memory of his daughter Kittie (real name Katherine) who had died in 1864 at the age of six. In 1888 Forster gave the chapel to Episcopal Diocese of Michigan and it was named St. Katherine's Chapel in memory of Kitty. In 1962, a new church was constructed nearby, but the chapel remained in use for weddings and other special events. On February 23, 1969, the chapel was designated a Michigan State Historic Site and on July 8, 1970, it was listed on the National Register of Historic Places. The parish known today as St. Katherine's Episcopal Church is still an active parish in the Episcopal Diocese of Michigan. The Rev. Melissa Congleton is the current Rector. The chapel is still in use today for one Sunday service a month as well as for occasional weddings and other events. The church holds it main services in the larger church building built further back on the same property.

== Description ==
St. Katherine's Chapel is a small wooden gabled Carpenter Gothic chapel measuring 21 feet by 36 feet, sitting on a concrete and rubble foundation. It is clad with vertical board and batten, with shingles in some gables. A projecting gables entryway on one end shelters a double door. A small belfry is on the roof. The interior of the chapel is rectangular, with pews on either side of a central aisle. Most of the interior is paneled with unpainted beaded pine boards. Windows on most elevation are glazed with large sheets of red, yellow, and blue glass.

== Cemetery ==
Forster, his daughter and other family members and parishioners were buried on the grounds of St. Katherine's. The small cemetery which developed there is now used mainly for the burial of cremated remains.
