= St Catherine's College, Armagh =

Coordinates: 54.350°N 6.664°W

St Catherine's College, Armagh Coláiste Chaitríona, Ard Mhacha
- Convent Rd, Armagh BT60 4BJ; Northern Ireland

Information
- Religious affiliation: Roman Catholic
- Established: 1973
- Local authority: Education Authority (Southern)
- Principal: Noeleen Tiffney
- Gender: All-Girls for EMU, Coeducational for IMU
- Age: 11 to 18
- Enrolment: Approx. 1,200
- Colour
- Website: https://stcatherinesarmagh.com/

Saint Catherine's College Armagh (Irish: Coláiste Chaitríona Ard Mhacha) is an all level Catholic school in Armagh, Northern Ireland. It caters for the 11-18 age group and is associated with the international group of schools served by the Society of the Sacred Heart.

== History ==
It was formed in 1973 when the existing Convent of the Sacred Heart Grammar and secondary schools in the city were re-organized on a comprehensive basis to provide secondary education for all the Catholic girls of the greater Armagh area. Saint Catherine's College was a boarding school in the earlier 1900s and was formed by the Sacred Heart trust to provide education for young girls of all backgrounds.

== Facilities ==
Saint Catherine's College is situated on a 30-acre (120,000 m^{2}) site off the Convent Road in Armagh and the existing school buildings have been refurbished and upgraded to ensure the provision of the most modern technological and sporting facilities. A £1.5 million building program has recently been completed with the construction of a new five classroom Information and Communication Technology building. New facilities have also been added to the Irish Medium Unit.

== Academics ==
The school caters for the full range of ability and comprises: Key Stage 3 (Years 8, 9 and 10), Key Stage 4 (Years 11 and 12) and Sixth Form (Years 13 and 14).

In 2018, 73.3% of its entrants achieved five or more GCSEs at grades A* to C, including the core subjects English and Maths. Also in 2018, 81.4% of its entrants to the A-level exam achieved A* to C grades.

An Sruth Gaeilge, which is an integral part of Saint Catherine's College, provides Irish Medium education for those who wish to build on the Irish Language competences acquired in the Bunscoileanna.

== Sports ==
The school is involved in many sporting activities including Gaelic football and camogie. In 2019, the school won the Lidl All-Ireland Schools Junior A Championship Gaelic football Final.

== Notable former pupils ==
- Michelle Gildernew (born 1970) - Sinn Féin politician
- Carla O'Brien (born 1983) - journalist
