= St Catherine's College of Education for Home Economics =

Sion Hill, Dublin, Ireland

St. Catherine’s College of Education for Home Economics, Sion Hill
- Type: Roman Catholic
- Active: 1929–2007
- Affiliations: Dominicans, University of Dublin
- Location: Sion Hill, Blackrock, Dublin, Ireland
- Campus: Suburban
- Nickname: Sion Hill, St. Catherine's

St. Catherine's College of Education for Home Economics, was set up by the Dominican Order in 1929 for the training of secondary school teachers of Domestic Science. The college was known more colloquially as either 'St Catherine's' or simply 'Sion Hill'. It was renamed in 1971 St. Catherine's College of Education for Home Economics. The Dominican Order also established The Froebel College of Education for primary school teachers at Sion Hill.

From the 1974 the college offered a three-year Bachelor of Education (B.Ed.) in Home Economics which was validated by Trinity College Dublin, this was recognised by the Teaching Council of Ireland for secondary school teaching of Home Economics, since students would also have studied Irish or Religion they would also be qualified to teach those subjects.

In 2004 it was announced that the college was to close, and it was closed in September 2007 with much of the Home Economics tuition going to St. Angela's College, Sligo.

== People Associated with St. Catherine's College ==
Sister Helen McGing served as principal of the college. Dr. Margaret Mac Curtain who served as prioress of Sion Hill Convent, served on the board of the college. Ms Madeleine Mulrennan also served as Principal/President.
