= St Catherine's, Lincoln =

Inner-city area of Lincoln, Lincolnshire, England

Coordinates: 53.2145°N 0.5462°W

St Catherine's is an inner-city area of Lincoln in Lincolnshire, England at the southern end of the High Street, and centred on a roundabout at its junction with the A15, B1190 (Newark Road) and South Park Avenue (continuation of the A15). The area is bordered by South Common in the east and the River Witham in the west. It is built over the site of the 12th century Priory of Saint Katherine without Lincoln, a monastic community that ran the Hospital of Saint Sepulchre.

== St Katherine's ==
The area is named after the dominant church of St Katherine, a Grade II listed, landmark building and Anglican church.

St Katherine's has views over the South Common, is home to the Priory Centre (officially opened by Prince Charles after extensive conservation work), the original site of the Lincoln Eleanor Cross and a residential area with some local businesses, including Jacksons Workwear Rental, UK Ink Supplies, New Road Fish Shop, Doctors' Surgery, Dentist, and hotels. St Catherine's is also the former home of the Upper Witham Internal Drainage Board offices.

The residential property in St Catherine's mainly consists of red brick built terraced housing, with some large detached and semi-detached houses, surrounding the local church of St Catherine's. The church of St Catherine lends its name to several roads in the area including St Catherine's Road, St Catherine's Terrace, St Catherine's Grove and St Catherine's Court.

== St Katherine's Heritage and Cultural Centre ==
St Katherine's Heritage and Cultural Centre is a multi-use access centre, offering the wider community a flexible, friendly community facility, providing a range of services and activities to all. It features exhibits of local history, and it operated by The Priory Trust.

== Eleanor cross ==
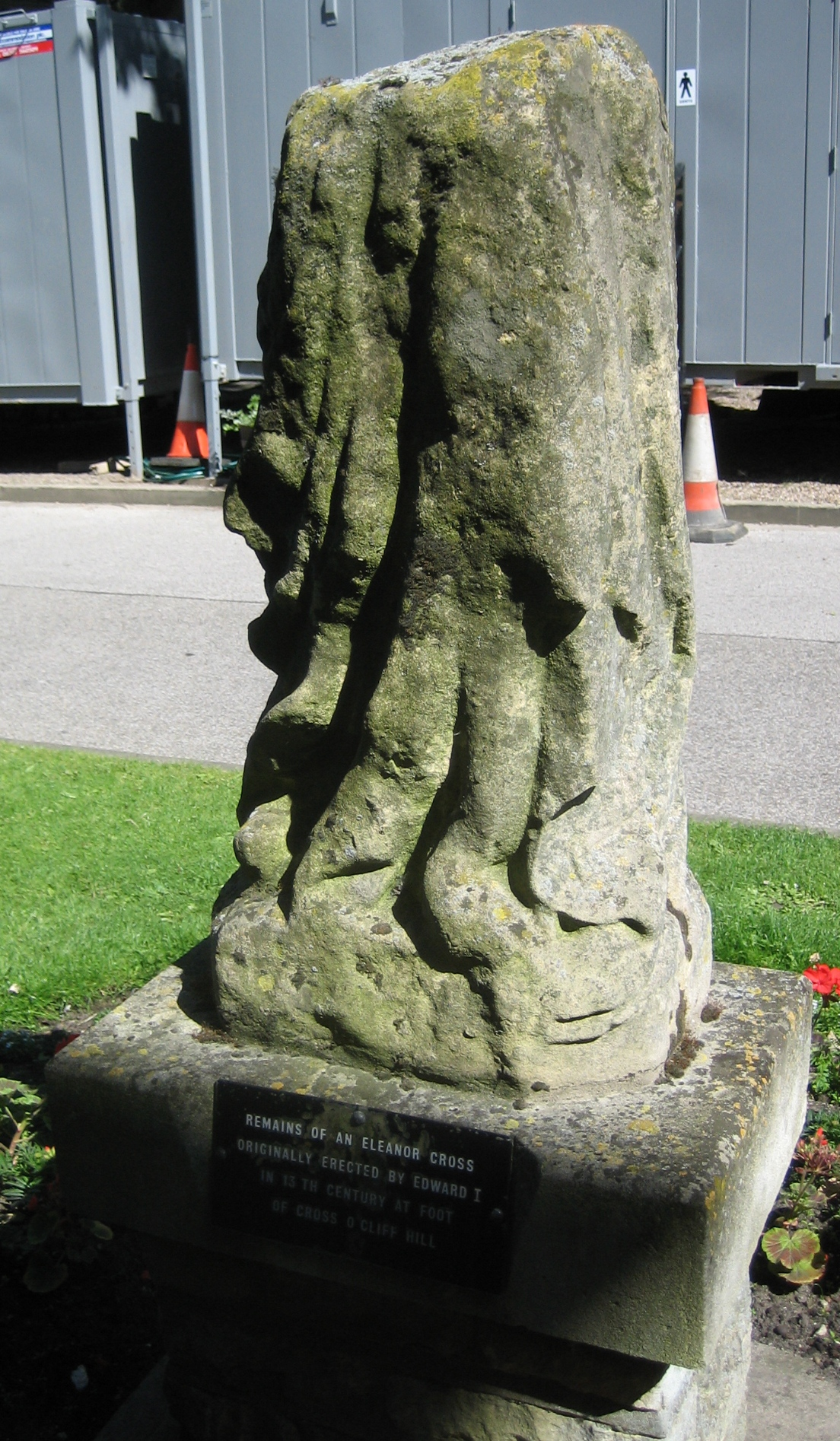
The St Catherine's, Lincoln, cross at Lincoln Castle

Edward I built Eleanor crosses between 1291 and 1295 in memory of his wife Eleanor of Castile. The Lincoln cross was built between 1291 and 1293 by Richard of Stow at a total recorded cost of over £120, with sculptures by William of Ireland, which would have most likely reflected the typical style of Eleanor cross, with multiple statues in a small tower. John Leland, in the early 1540s, noted that "a litle without Barre [gate] is a very fair crosse and large".

Queen Eleanor was taken ill on a journey to meet King Edward and was diagnosed as having "slow fever", she was taken to Richard de Westons manor house at Harby near Lincoln, and it was there she died in November 1290. Edward was grief-stricken at his wife's death and shut himself away for several days, possibly planning memorials to his beloved Queen Eleanor.

The Queen's body was first taken to Lincoln for embalming at St Catherine's Priory. The viscera was buried in a tomb at Lincoln Cathedral on 3 December 1290, and her heart was buried at Blackfriars church in London. Her body was taken to Westminster Abbey for burial in a tomb. King Edward later declared that to honour Eleanor, a memorial would be erected wherever the Queen's body had rested on its journey home to Westminster.

Crosses of this nature were erected in the hope that pilgrims and those passing by would pray for the soul of the Queen. The first of the Eleanor crosses was erected on Swine's Green, opposite the gates of St Catherine's, an area just outside the city at the southern end of the High Street. Of the twelve crosses erected, only three now remain standing.

The statue had disappeared by the early 18th century, but the only surviving piece, the lower half of one of the statues, was rediscovered in the 19th century. The only remaining piece of the Eleanor cross that survives is a small piece preserved in Lincoln Castle. The Priory Centre is planning to have a replica of the Queen Eleanor cross erected at the front of the Priory.

== The Priory Academy LSST (school) ==
The Priory Academy LSST is a secondary school and Sixth Form named after St Catherine's Priory (based near its original site). It now forms part of the Priory Federation of Academies, a group of Lincolnshire schools including the Priory Witham Academy, the Priory City of Lincoln Academy and the Priory Ruskin Academy.
