= Landscape with a Windmill =

Painting by Jacob van Ruisdael

- Artist: Jacob van Ruisdael
- Year: 1646
- Medium: oil paint, panel
- Dimensions: 49.5 cm (19.5 in) × 68.5 cm (27.0 in)
- Location: Doughty House
- Collection: Cleveland Museum of Art, Cook collection
- Identifiers: RKDimages ID: 248226

Landscape with a Windmill is an oil-on-panel painting executed by the Dutch artist Jacob van Ruisdael in 1646, early in his career. It is now in the Cleveland Museum of Art in Ohio. It had initially been loaned to them by the Mr and Mrs William H. Marlatt fund, who had bought it in 1967 from Kunsthandlung F. Kleinberger & Co, a New York art dealer, who had in turn bought it at the auction of the Cook collection at Christie's in London on 25 November 1966.

It shows a windmill and fields in the foreground, with the North Sea sand dunes near the painter's birthplace of Haarlem in the background. It is signed and dated JvR 1646. The work shows that at this date Jacob was still strongly influenced by the style of his uncle and teacher Salomon van Ruysdael. Four preparatory drawings for the work are now in the Gemäldegalerie Alte Meister in Dresden. He returned to similar compositions with a landmark in the left or right hand corner of the foreground and a landscape in the background throughout his career, such as in Evening Landscape: A Windmill by a Stream.

== Exhibitions ==
- 1946: Dutch and Flemish paintings of the seventeenth century from the Cook Collection., Usher Gallery, Lincoln, UK
- 1964–1966: Manchester City Art Gallery, Manchester, UK
- 2011: Jacob van Ruisdael landscapes, Cleveland Museum of Art

== See also ==
- List of paintings by Jacob van Ruisdael

== Bibliography ==
- Seymour Slive, Jacob Van Ruisdael. A Complete Catalogue of His Paintings, Drawings, and Etchings. Yale University Press, New Haven, 2001, ISBN 0-300-08972-4, page 145, (books.google.de).
- Seymour Slive, Jacob Van Ruisdael. Windmills and Water Mills. Getty Publications, Los Angeles, 2011, ISBN 978-1-60606-055-1, page 10, (books.google.com).
