= James Ward Usher =

James Ward Usher (1845–1921) was a businessman and philanthropist in Lincoln.

Usher's father, also James, opened a Jewellers and Watchmakers in High Street, Lincoln in 1837. His son, James Ward, was born on 1 January 1845. Leaving school in 1860 the younger James entered the family business in 1860, taking sole control of the business 14 years later.

Usher was an enthusiastic collector of fine clocks, watches, porcelain and paintings. His personal collection became the basis for the Usher Gallery which was founded after his death using a legacy he left for the purpose. In 2005 the Usher Gallery was merged with Lincoln's City and County Museum to form The Collection, combining Lincoln's art and museum collections.

Usher was a successful businessman, who acquired in the late 19th century the rights to reproduce in jewellery the Lincoln Imp, using the image on tie clips and spoons which sold in huge numbers. Usher is reported to have given a pin to the Prince of Wales, who was seen wearing it.

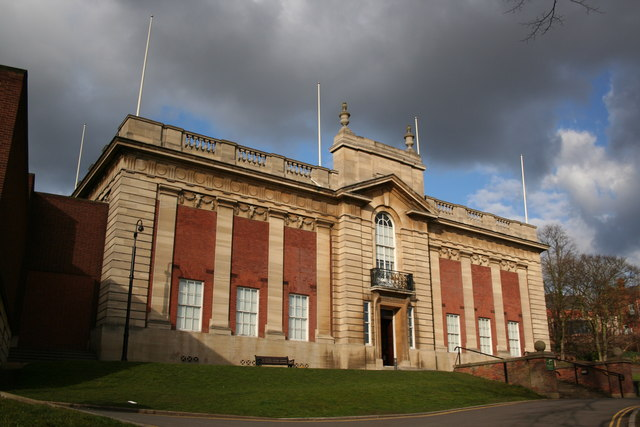
Usher Gallery
