= Grimsby Minster =

- The Minster and Parish Church of St James, Grimsby
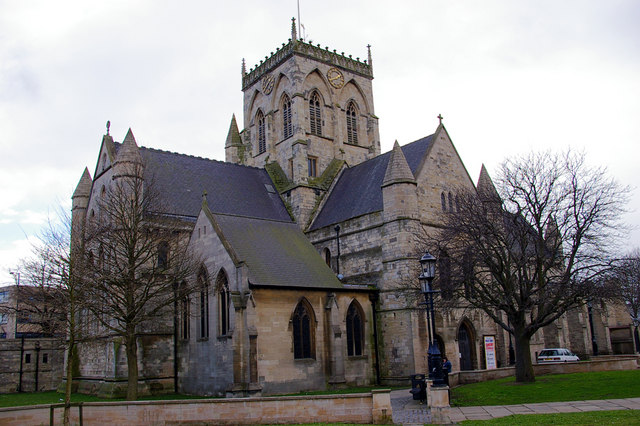
- Grimsby Minster
- 53.563792°N 0.089360°W
- OS grid reference: TA 26640 09169
- Location: Grimsby, North East Lincolnshire
- Country: England
- Denomination: Church of England
- Churchmanship: Central
- Website: grimsbyminster.com

History
- Former name(s): Grimsby Parish Church; St James' Church; The Church of St Mary and St James
- Status: Parish church
- Dedication: James, son of Zebedee

Architecture
- Functional status: Active
- Heritage designation: Grade I listed building

Administration
- Province: Canterbury
- Diocese: Lincoln
- Archdeaconry: Stow & Lindsey
- Deanery: Grimsby
- Parish: Grimsby

Clergy
- Vicar: Canon Peter Mullins - (Temporary consultant Priest)

Grimsby Minster is a minster and parish church in Grimsby, North East Lincolnshire, England. Dedicated to St James, the church belongs to the Church of England and is within the Diocese of Lincoln.

== Background ==
In 1114, a religious building was transferred to Robert Bloet, the Bishop of Lincoln. The following years he supervised many renovations and developments to the building, resulting in St James, a church containing a nave with six bays. The central tower was added in 1365. In 1586 St James became the parish church of Grimsby, after John Whitgift united the parishes of St James and St Mary's. The parish church of the latter was built on Victoria Street. In 1856 Canon Ainslie began a restoration of St James, which included lengthening the chancel and rebuilding the south transept. Later works included the installation of windows with stone tracery and new oak roofs.

The next key event in the history of the church, was the opening of the James College in 1883. The predecessor of today's St James' School, it was founded by Canon Young. It was the only choir school in the UK to be attached to a parish church until the restructuring of the choir in September 2013 by Anthony Pinel, opening membership of the choir to boys and girls from any local school.

The news that the church was to be granted minster status was announced in the Grimsby Telegraph on 15 April 2010. The Minster-making ceremony took place on Sunday, 16 May 2010 led by the Lord Bishop of Lincoln and the Bishop of Grimsby. The Mayor of North East Lincolnshire, Councillor John Colebrook, accepted the official declaration of Minster status on behalf of the Borough.

== Parish structure ==
The Parish of Grimsby, St Mary and St James and St Hugh includes one other church:

- St Hugh's Church, Grimsby was built as a 'daughter church' of St James. The churches form a parish with one Parochial church council.

Until 31 August 2022, the parish contained two other 'daughter churches', St Martin's and St Mark's. On 1 September 2022 these two churches were created into the new parish of Grimsby, St Mark's and St Martin's.

== Grim's Tomb ==
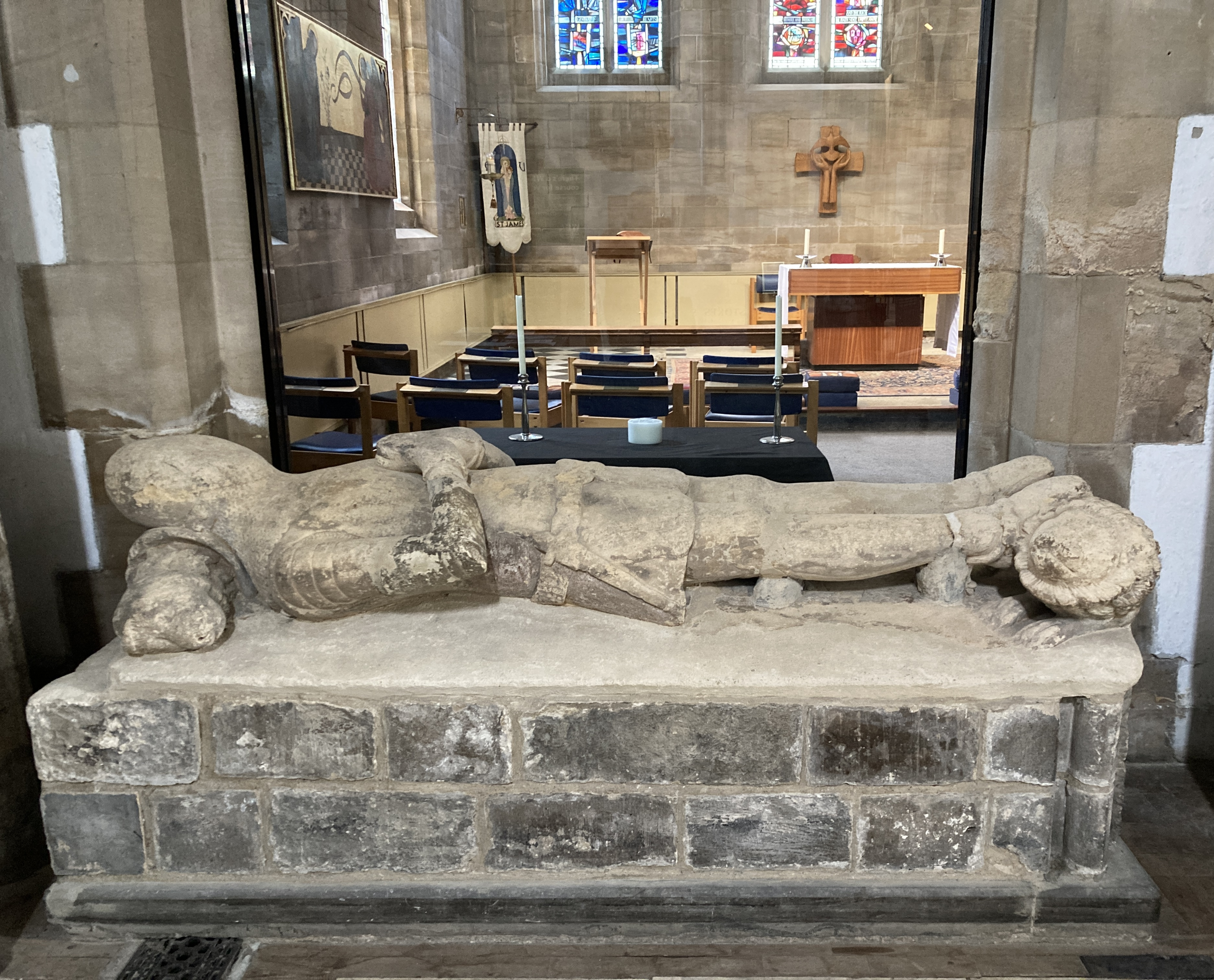
'Grim's Tomb' in the Minster (2024)

In 1913 a verger is recorded as erroneously presenting this memorial as 'Grim's Tomb'. Local traditions have claimed for many years that the mortal remains of Grim, the town's probably mythical Viking founder, were laid to rest here.

According to legend a famous story of Viking settlement in England involves Lincolnshire's Viking hero, Havelok, the Danish prince who came to rule part or all of England. First recorded in the 13th-century Middle English romance Havelok the Dane, a lively and fast-moving poem, the tale is frequently funny with important questions about what makes a good ruler and a just society: kindness is rewarded, cruelty punished, and the rightful king restored to his proper place.

The recumbent effigy is that of Sir Thomas Haslerton. A 14th-century knight from a family owning land on the north bank of the Humber, Sir Thomas also held land at Aylseby. Sir Thomas was celebrated locally for his generous patronage, rebuilding St Leonard's Nunnery which had been destroyed by fire. The nunnery was located at the junction of Bargate and Weelsby Road which is today still known as Nun's Corner.

== Windows ==
The majority of windows within Grimsby Minster were reglazed around 1910, the names of their donors recorded on brass plaques. However, these were all blown out by bombing raids on Grimsby during the Second World War with the exception of those in the Memorial Chapel. They were replaced largely according to the original theological programme thanks to the generosity of a post-war generation of local philanthropists - many as memorial windows - whose names are recorded in script within the glass. The windows depict the history of the Anglican Church and those in the north aisle the Life of Jesus from the Adoration of the Magi to the Last Supper.

The stained glass artist Hugh Easton produced four windows for the church between 1954 and 1957. In the north transept are two two-light windows that make up a single commission, depicting the four archangels Uriel, Gabriel, Raphael, and Michael. They were installed in 1954. Easton also provided two memorial windows for the church, both installed in 1957. The Franklin memorial window depicts the Creation of the sun, moon and stars, while the Gibson memorial window has a design representing the Holy Sacrament.

Easton's contemporary, the Newcastle-based stained glass artist Leonard Evetts, created five two-light windows for the Lady Chapel between 1954 and 1956. They each depict a scene from the Magnificat and form a coherent commission consistent with their location in the chapel dedicated to the Virgin Mary.

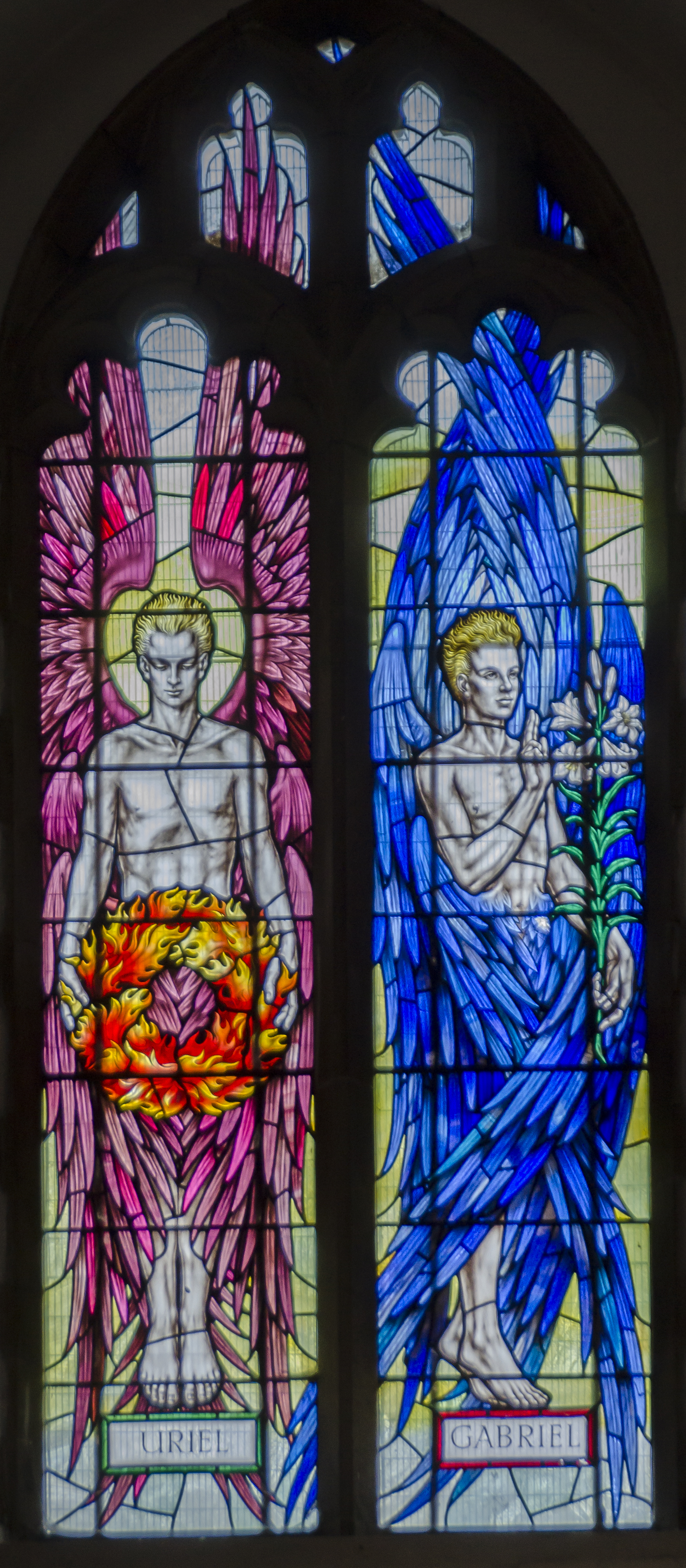
Archangels Uriel and Gabriel, Hugh Easton (1954)

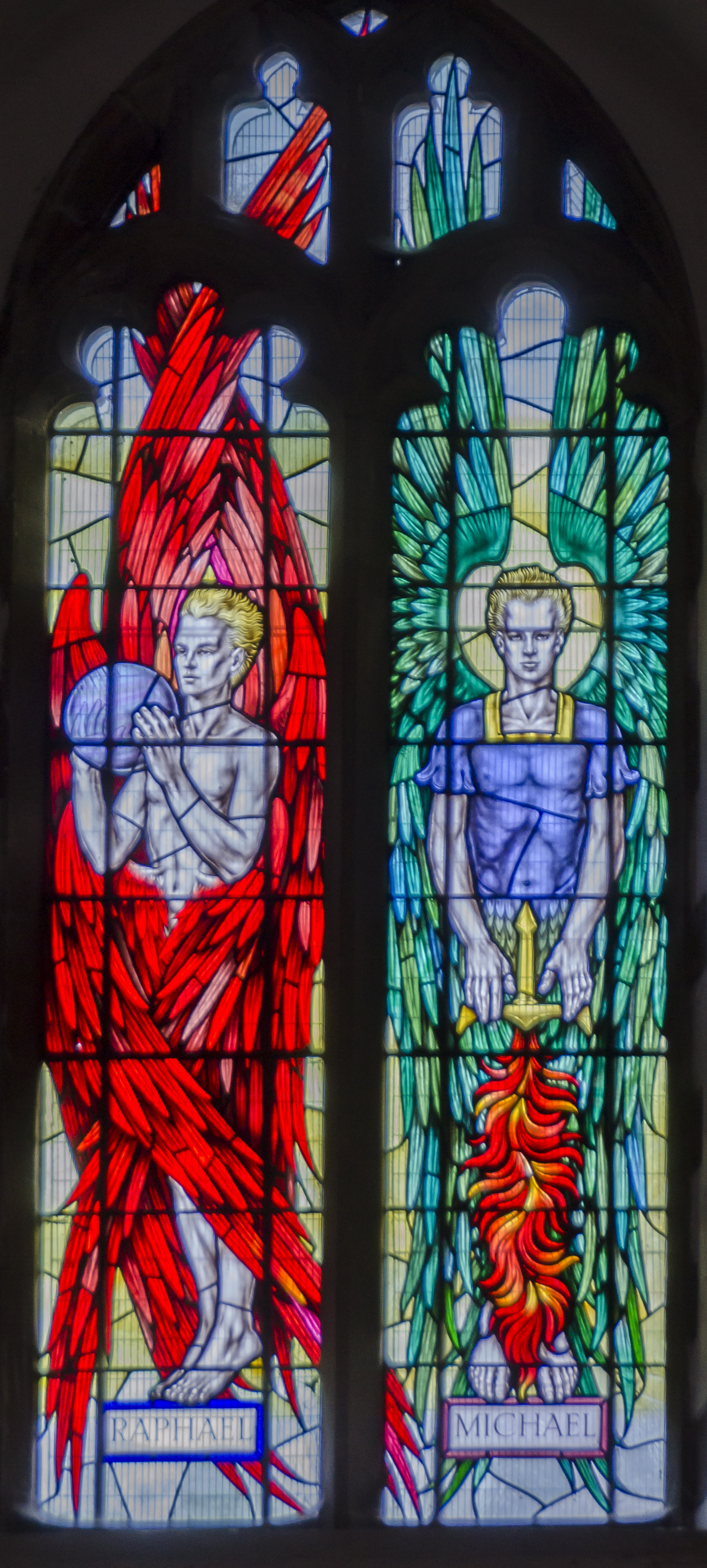
Archangels Raphael and Michael, Hugh Easton (1954)

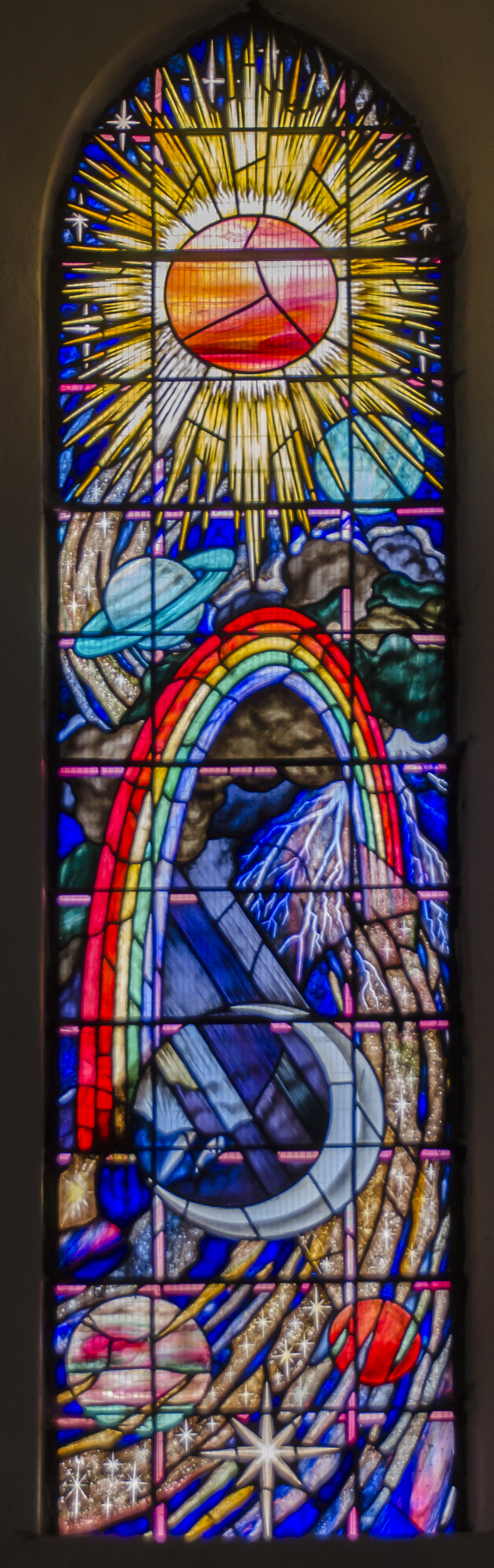
Creation window by Hugh Easton (1957)

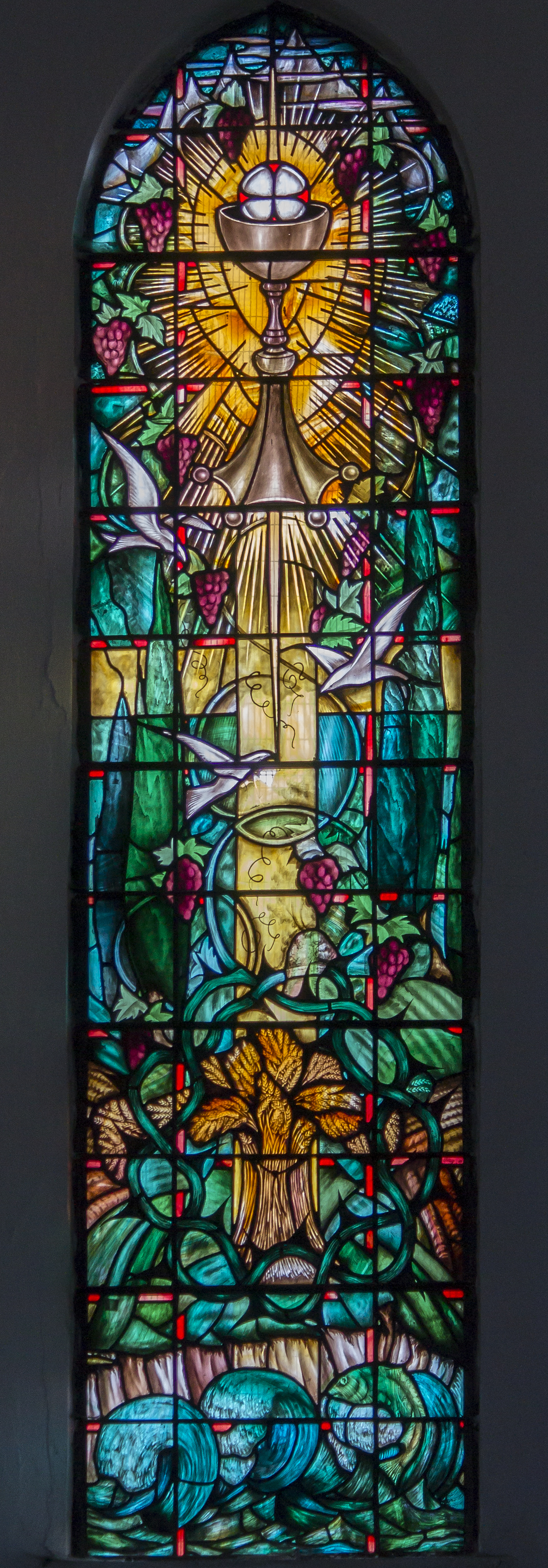
Holy Sacrament window by Hugh Easton (1957)

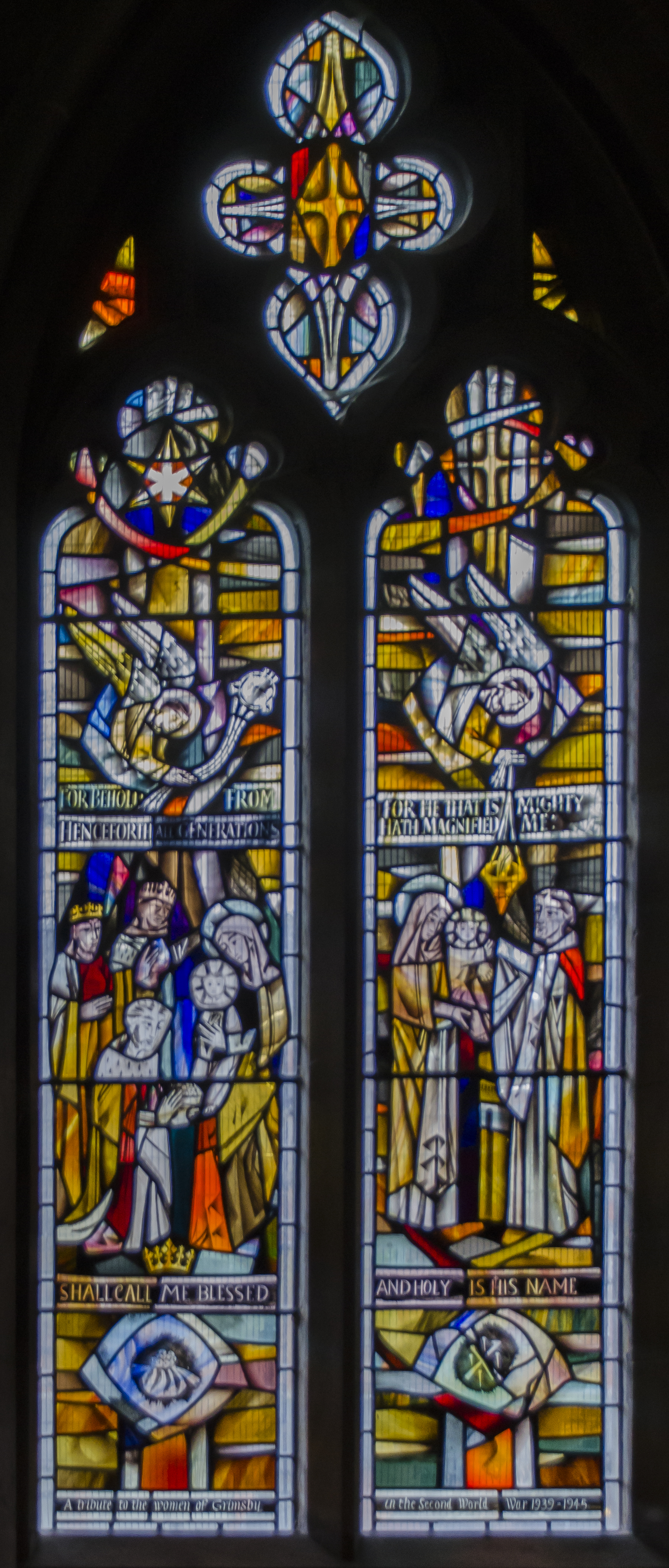
One of five windows in the Lady Chapel by Leonard Evetts depicting the Magnificat

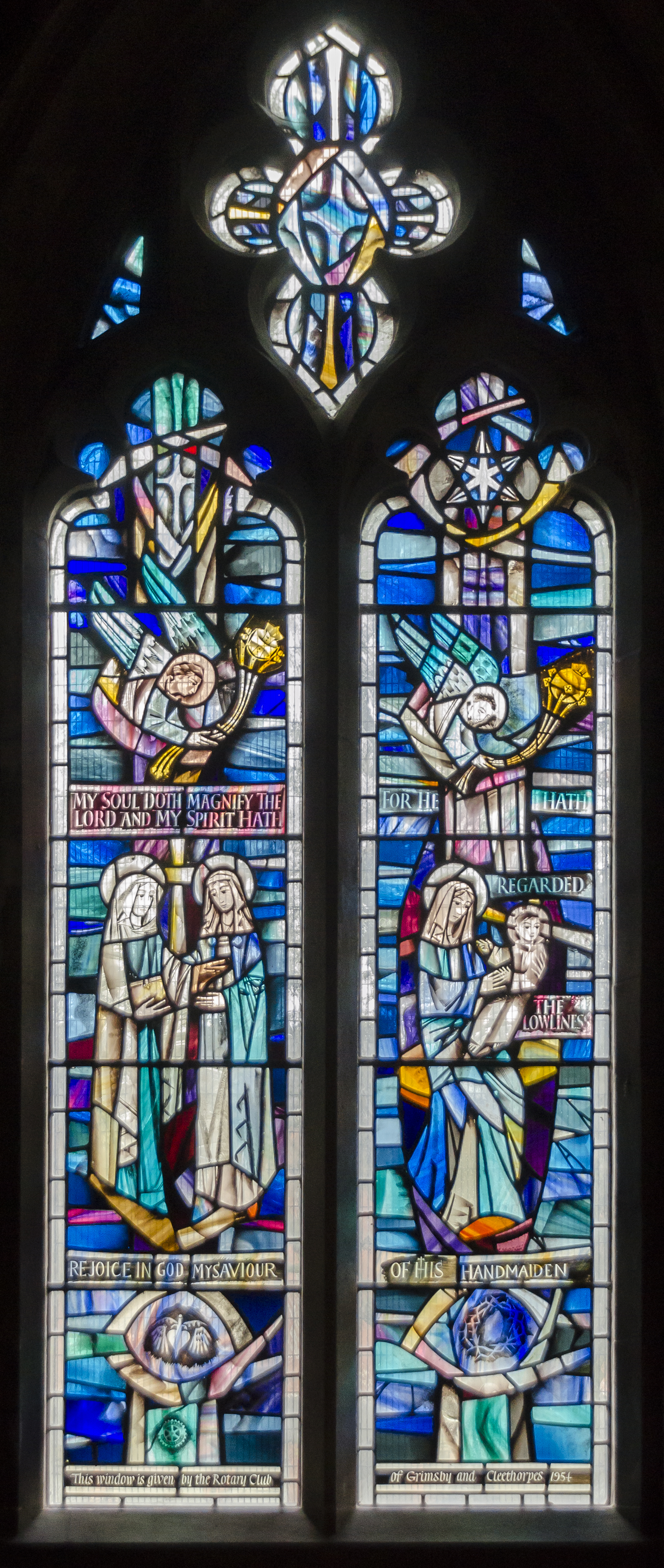
One of five windows in the Lady Chapel by Leonard Evetts depicting the Magnificat

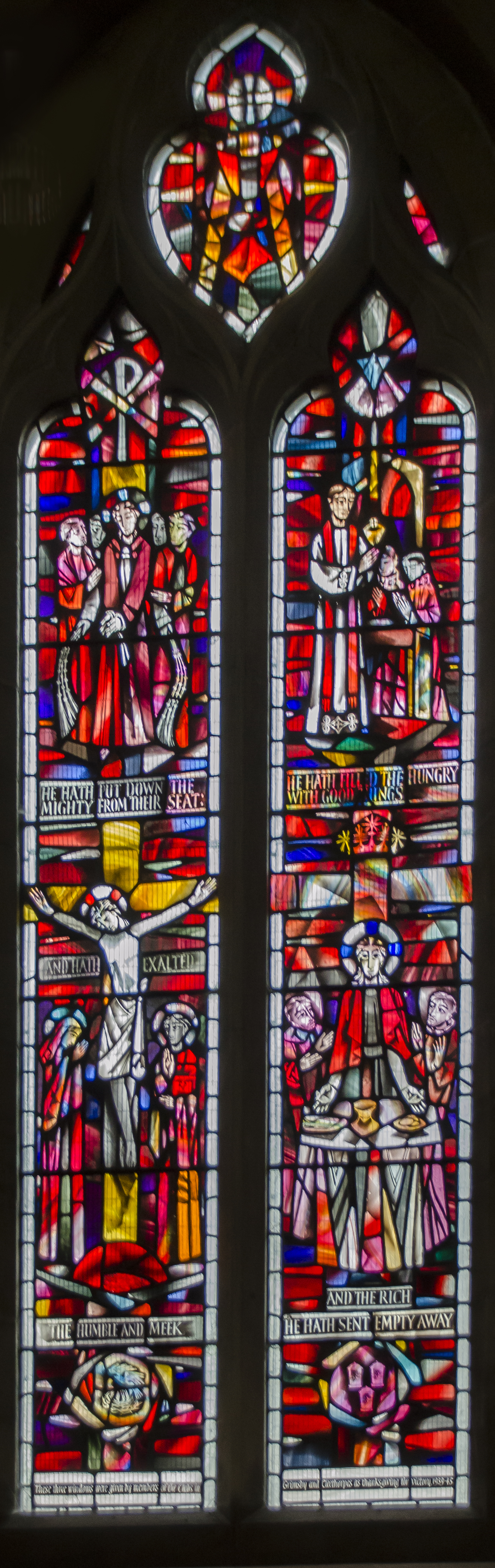
One of five windows in the Lady Chapel by Leonard Evetts depicting the Magnificat

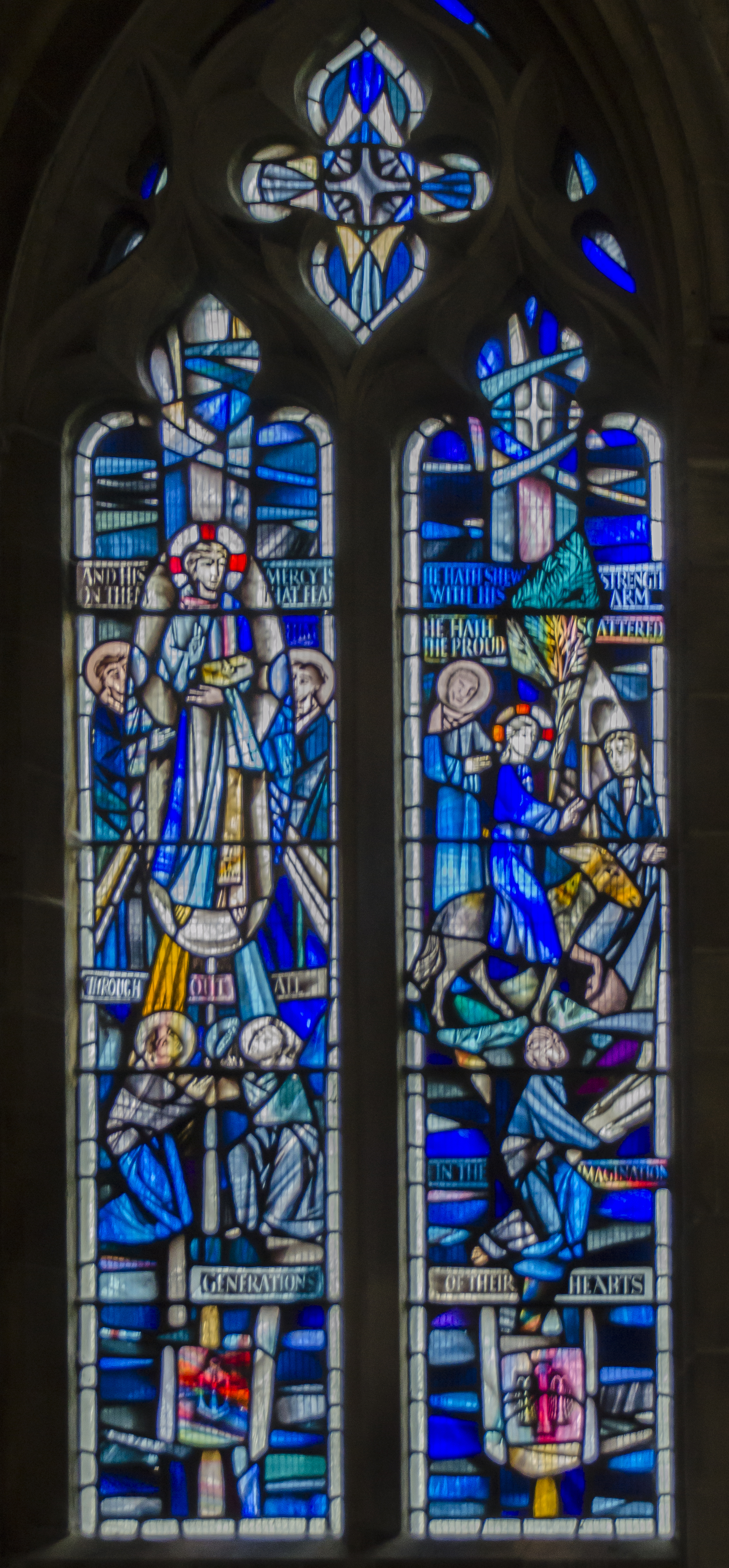
One of five windows in the Lady Chapel by Leonard Evetts depicting the Magnificat

== Grimsby Imp ==
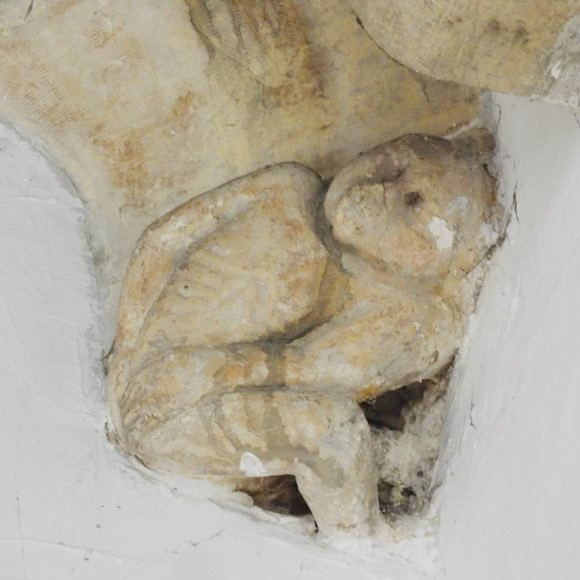
The Grimsby Imp

In the south aisle at the top of a column supporting the bell tower is the 12th-century stone carving known as the Grimsby Imp. The legend associates the imp with the Lincoln Imp, claiming that both were sent by the devil to torment the parishioners of Lincoln Cathedral where they broke tables and chairs and tripped up the bishop. So successful were the imps in their task that God sent an angel to warn them to cease and repent or suffer the consequences. One imp was so frightened by the threat that he hid under a table; but the other defiantly threw rocks at the angel, and was promptly turned to stone as the Lincoln Imp.

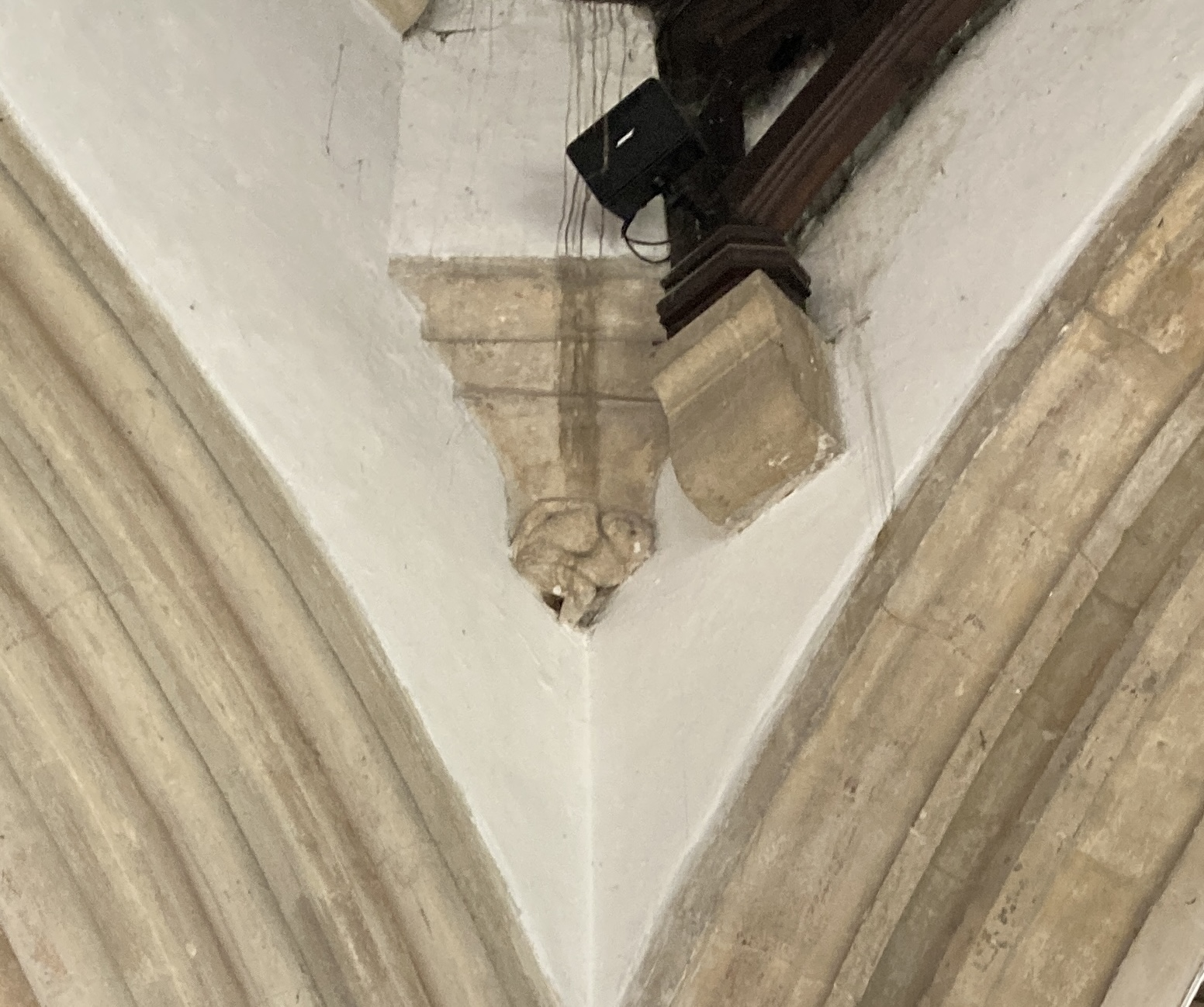
The Grimsby Imp on its column

The other promised to heed the warning and fled to Grimsby where he resumed his previous bad behaviour, terrorising the innocent parishioners. The angel pursued him and smacked his behind, turning him too into stone.

Others are not convinced that the carving represents an imp, believing that it is the figure of a man holding up the beams on his back. In May 2021 an item in Grimsby Live, "The truth behind Grimsby's very own legendary imp" expanded the story to include the twisted spire of Chesterfield Parish Church. It said a vicar at Grimsby Minster "has a more logical and historical explanation for the figure suggesting one of the craftsmen who built the Minster carved the figure of a man bending over supporting the church." In September 2021 North East Lincolnshire Council announced that Grimsby Minster was to be part of the "Lincoln Imp Trail", involving 32 painted sculptures inspired by the Lincoln Imp placed at various sites around Lincolnshire in a venture organised by the Lincoln Business Improvement Group. Grimsby Minster website makes no mention of the imp.

== Lady Chapel ==
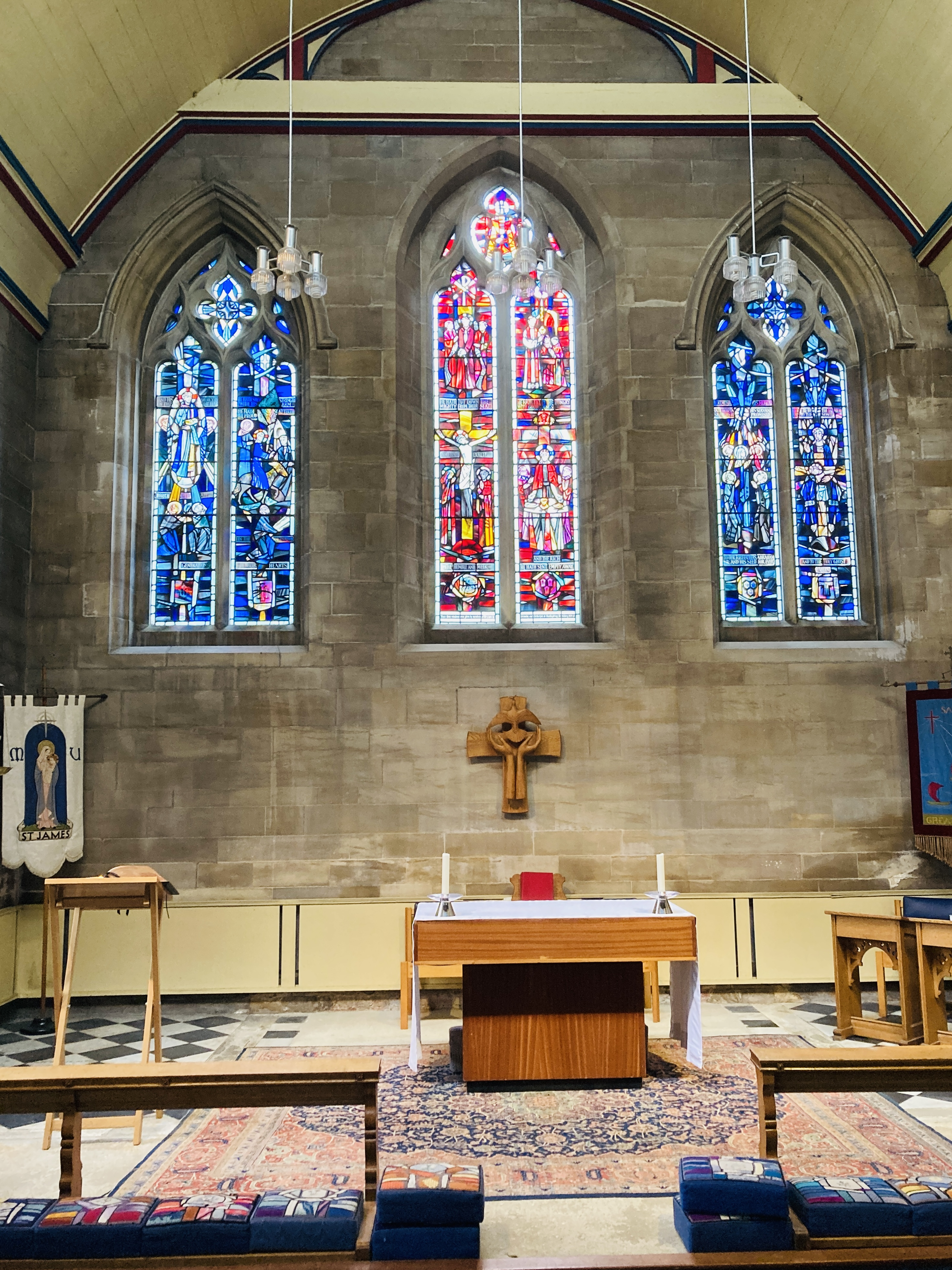
The Lady Chapel

The Lady Chapel stands on the site of a medieval chapel demolished around 1720. The chapel opened in 1905 as a memorial to Canon James Peter Young, a 19th-century Vicar of Grimsby and founder of schools. The Hagioscope, or squint window is a medieval relic offering a coveted viewpoint to the Elevation of the Host during Mass at the High Altar in the Chancel.

The dedication to 'Our Lady' honours the Blessed Virgin Mary, mother of Jesus.

== Memorial Chapel ==
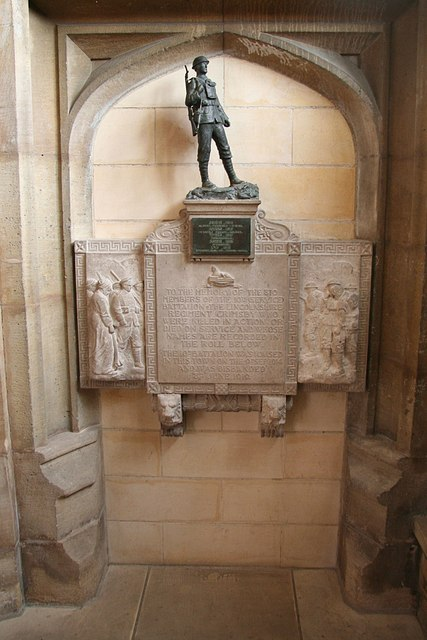
Memorial erected to the memory of the 810 members of the 10th (Service) Battalion, Lincolnshire Regiment ("Grimsby Chums") who were killed in action or died on service in the First World War

The Memorial Chapel was completed in 1921 on the initiative of Canon Algernon Markham, a former Vicar. The Roll of Honour, acknowledging the 2,100 local people who gave their lives for King and country during the First World War, is inscribed on gunmetal thanks to the generosity of Sir Alec Black. Also of note is the memorial to the "Grimsby Chums", a Lincolnshire Regiment enrolled in response to Kitchener's 1914 recruitment call to "join now with your pals".

Of the 304 such 'Pals Battalions', only that from Grimsby chose to be known as the "Chums".

== Organ ==
The church has two pipe organs. The west end organ is by J. W. Walker & Sons Ltd and dates from 1951, built to replace an earlier instrument destroyed by enemy action during the Second World War. Parts of the pre-war instrument were incorporated within the new organ, notably soundboards and some pedal pipes. A specification and pictures of the organ can be seen on the National Pipe Organ Register. The Walker organ was rebuilt by J. W. Walker in 1976, with significant tonal modifications being made at this time.

Given the distance between the west end of the church and the choir, a second organ was installed on the north side of the choir in the 1970s, by Johnson. This two manual and pedal instrument is used for choral services to accompany the choir. The specification and photographs of this instrument can be found on the National Pipe Organ Register.

=== Organists ===
Former organists include

- Edwin Brammer c. 1872
- James Forbes Carter c. 1896
- John Stanley Robson 1924 – 1953
- Eric Arthur Conningsby 1954 – 1955 (formerly organist of Llandaff Cathedral)
- Dennis Townhill 1956 – 1961
- Martin How 1961 – 1964
- Michael Dudman 1964 – 1968
- Robert Walker 1968 – 1973
- Christopher Weaver 1974 – 1979
- Andrew Brade 1979 – 1981
- Patrick Larley 1982 – 1987
- Andrew Shaw 1987 – 1993
- Andrew Cantrill 1994 – 1996
- Steven Maxson 1997 – 2003
- Adrian Roberts 2003 – 2006
- Anthony Pinel 2006 – 2014
- Steven Maxson 2014 – 2021

=== Assistant organists ===
- E. Charles Hopkins 1956 – c1958
- Philip Cave 1968–1971
- Anthony Marwood 1971-
- Andrew Brade 1977 - 1979
- Stephen Maltby 1979 – 1982
- Barry Whitfield 1991 – 2006
- Steven Maxson 2006 – 2014
- Stefano Golli 2014 - 2018

== Choir ==
Grimsby Minster was the only parish church in England to have its own choir school, St James' School. The school was founded in 1880 as St James' Choir School by Canon James Peter Young to educate choirboys and it is now a co-educational school of the Alpha Group.

Since September 2013, instituted by organist Anthony Pinel, boy choristers have been drawn from across the county of North East Lincolnshire and, in his successor's time, beyond and membership of the choir is also open to girls.

== Bells ==
The minster has 10 bells hung for full-circle ringing. They weigh a total of 4.3 tonnes, the tenor (the largest bell) weighing 18.25cwt and having a diameter of 4 feet. They are tuned to the key of E flat. They date from 1830 when three were cast by William Dobson, and several bellfounders have cast the rest since then, including John Taylor & Co and John Warner & Sons, the newest bells (the two lightest) were cast in 1962 by Mears and Stainbank.

== Grounds ==
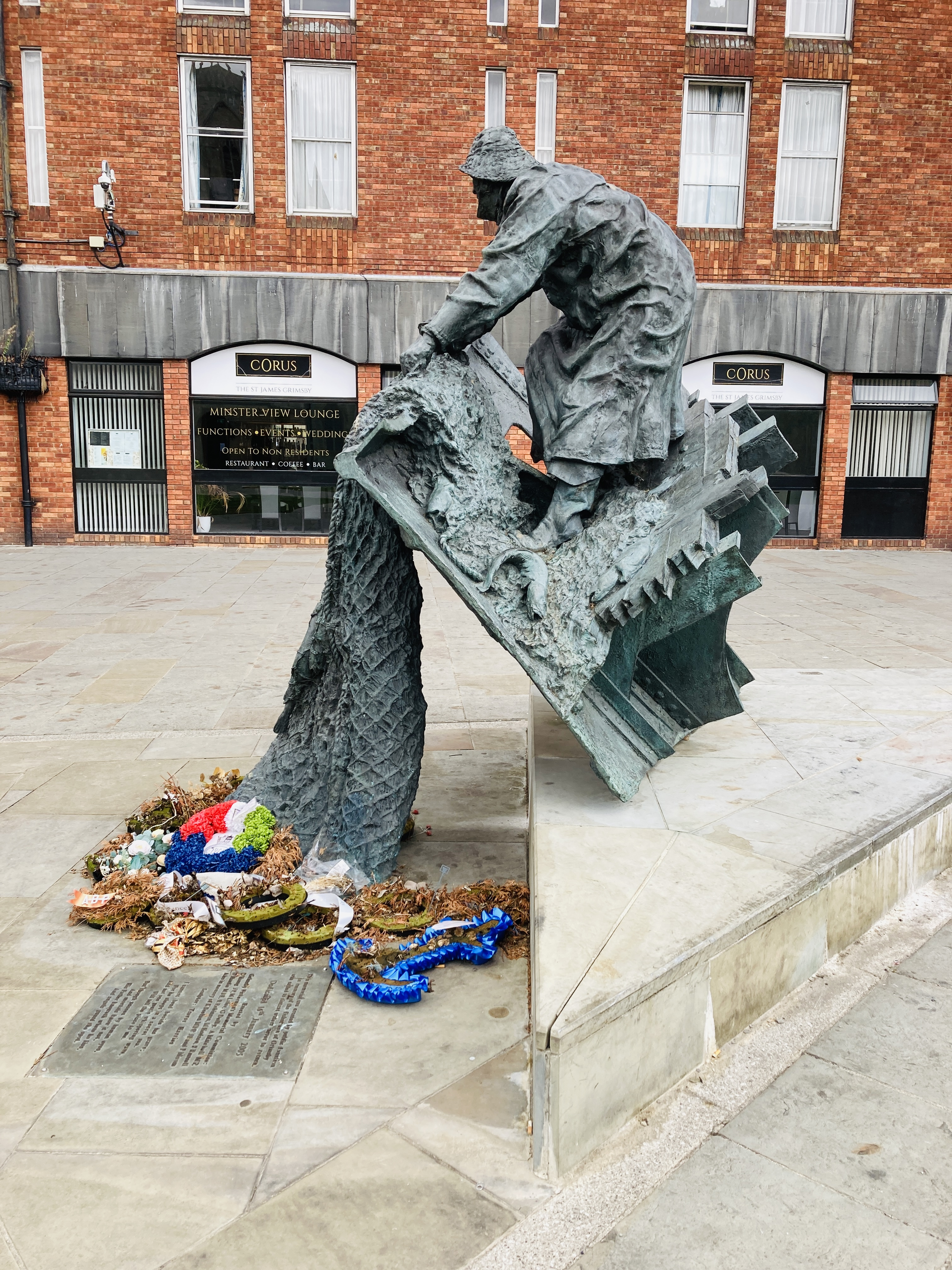
'Fishermen's Memorial' by Trevor Harries in 2024

The former churchyard is now 'St James Square' and was the subject of a £1.8 million redevelopment in 2021. The square features three permanent artworks:

- The 'Fishermen's Memorial' by sculptor Trevor Harries is a bronze statue of a trawlerman pulling in a fishing net. It was installed in the square in 2005.
- 'Human Murmuration' by Annabel McCourt is mounted on a wall at the east side of the square and features silhouettes of local residents who volunteered to be photographed to create the artwork.
- 'Come Follow Me' by Adrian Riley is a 35m long text artwork etched into the stone paving of the square featuring poetry by local writers.
