= Evening Landscape: A Windmill by a Stream =

Painting by Jacob van Ruisdael

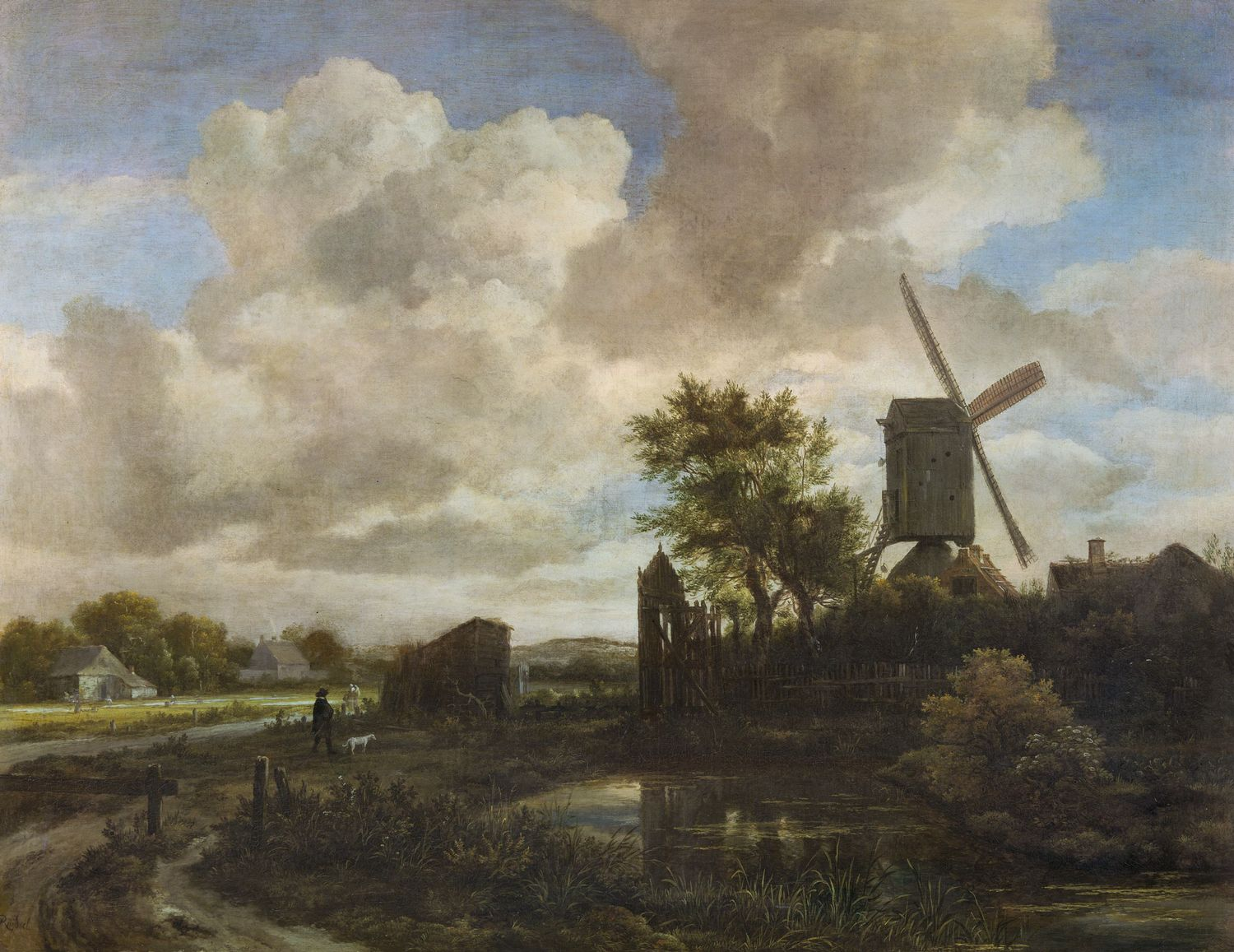
Evening Landscape: A Windmill by a Stream by Jacob van Ruisdael

Evening Landscape: A Windmill by a Stream is a 17th-century oil on canvas painting by the Dutch Golden Age painter Jacob van Ruisdael. It is in the collection of Queen Elizabeth II, on display at the Queen's Gallery at Buckingham Palace. It was acquired by King George IV in 1810.

A similar painting, dated 1646, is in the collection of the Cleveland Museum of Art. Slive writes that the Queen's version shows how much young Ruisdael has progressed in just a few years. The farm and windmill are more set back and reflections of evening light create a freer sense of space.

The painting is catalogue number 130 in Seymour Slive's 2001 catalogue raisonné of Ruisdael. The painting is number 173 in the 1911 catalogue raisonné by art historian Hofstede de Groot, where it is called A View in Holland: Landscape with a Windmill. Its dimensions are 75.6 cm x 100.8 cm. It is signed in the lower left. It is not dated, but Slive writes it is dateable to about 1650.

== See also ==
- List of paintings by Jacob van Ruisdael
