= St James School, Grimsby =

Coordinates: 53.56058°N 0.09280°W

St James School
- Grimsby, North East Lincolnshire, DN34 4SY; England

Information
- Type: Private day and boarding
- Motto: Doctrinæ Fons Pietas (From Learning Springs Piety)
- Religious affiliation: Church of England
- Established: 1880
- Local authority: North East Lincolnshire
- Department for Education URN: 118124 Tables
- Head teacher: Mr Stephen Thompson
- Gender: Coeducational
- Age: 11 to 18
- Enrolment: 230~
- Houses: Walkerly; Lindsey; Blakeney
- Former pupils: Old Jacobeans
- Affiliation: Woodard Corporation
- Website: http://www.saintjamesschool.co.uk

St James School is a coeducational private day and boarding school located in Grimsby, North East Lincolnshire, England. It comprises a Senior School and Sixth Form. The school is associated with the Church of England Grimsby Minster, dedicated to St James.

== History ==
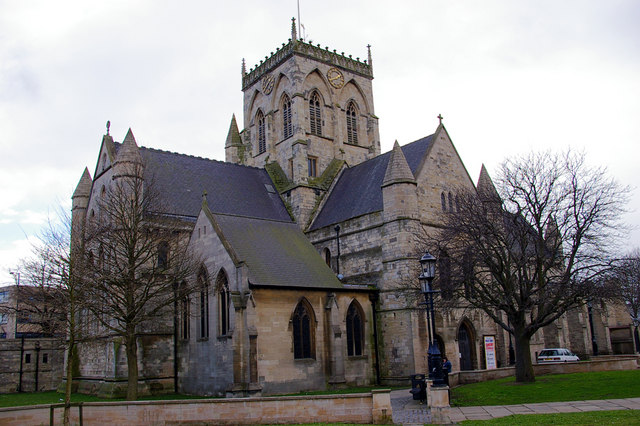
St James's Church, Grimsby

Formerly known as St James Choir School, the school was founded on the premises of Grimsby's parish church, St James's (now Grimsby Minster). Canon James Peter Young, curate and later vicar at the church, was influenced by Nathaniel Woodard's education philosophy and established the school in 1880 to educate the church's choirboys. Classes were initially held in the Church's "Aqua Rooms", which became unsuitable. In 1882 the school became St James's College, with the intention of continuing to educate the boys after they outgrew the choir. The original choir school moved to a new site before reuniting with the college in 1904. A pre-preparatory department was added in 1957 and a sixth form and boarding programme two years later. It became an associated Woodard School in 1968 and was incorporated in 1985.

Girls were first admitted in 1973 and accepted as boarders two years later. In 1975 "choir" was dropped from the school’s name, as it had now expanded to educate many other pupils, and choristers were a minority. Since 2014, the school has no longer educated the Minster's Choristers, who are now drawn from eleven different schools, and open to all.

== Boarding ==
Boarding pupils at St. James are housed within Woodard House, a purpose built boarding facility opposite the main school campus. The boarding programme is available to pupils in Year 7 and above.

== Notable Old Jacobeans ==
- Walter Bertram Wood (1898–1917), First World War flying ace
