= Usher Gallery =

Art gallery in Lincolnshire, United Kingdom

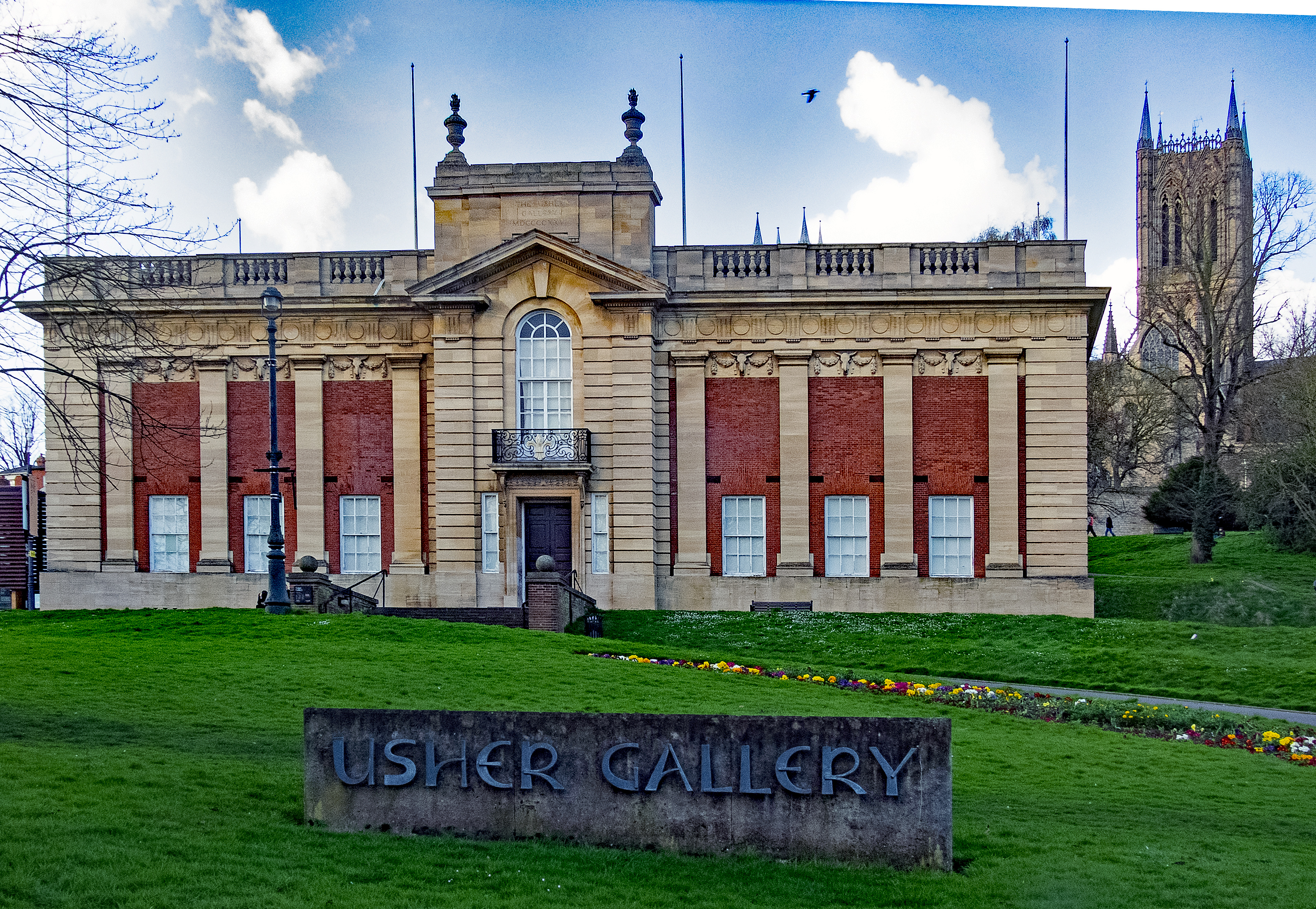
- Established: 1927; 99 years ago
- Location: Lincoln, England
- Coordinates: 53.2321°N 0.536556°W
- Type: Art gallery
- Website: www.lincolnmuseum.com

The Usher Gallery is an art museum in Lincoln, England. The gallery displays a collection of artworks by painters such as J. M. W. Turner and L. S. Lowry. Established in 1927, it is run as part of Lincoln Museum.

== History ==
James Ward Usher was born in Lincoln on 1 January 1845. He was a son of James Usher, who founded a jeweller and watchmakers' business in 1837 on the Lincoln High Street. Usher left school and joined his father's business, Usher and Son, after 1874. He painted pictures of his collections to illustrate his inventory. Usher visited Christie's auction in 1833 for the first time, and began collecting watches, ceramics from the Meissen and Sèvres porcelain factories, English silver, enamels, and portrait miniatures. An enamelled thimble case, reportedly from the family of Charlotte Brontë, is said to have been his favourite item. The right to use the Lincoln Imp in his work increased the popularity of his collections, with the Prince of Wales seen wearing a pin with the imp (reportedly a gift from Usher). Usher died in 1921, leaving considerable funds to build a gallery. He had never married, and his will requested that his collection be stored in a museum bearing his name. City librarian A. R. Corns was appointed director of the library, museum and Usher Art Gallery in March 1927. The gallery, designed by Reginald Blomfield, was opened on 25 May 1927 by the Prince of Wales.

The gallery is a stone-faced building with brick panels separated by simplified Tuscan pilasters under a frieze decorated with triglyphs and a roof line finished with a balustrade. The portico, in the centre of the south façade, is topped by a broken pediment and urn finials. It is in a small park on the south-facing hill, overlooking the lower town.

Lincolnshire's only purpose-built public art gallery, it is a Grade II* listed building. The gallery is owned by the Lincoln City Council, and leased to the Lincolnshire County Council.

=== Development ===
The City and County Museum merged with the Usher Gallery. The government decided to create a museum in 1906, and Arthur Smith was appointed curator. Smith, born in 1869, was a fellow of the Linnean Society and the Royal Entomological Society. In 1896, he was a founder and honorary secretary of the Grimsby and District Naturalist Society. Smith collected local materials and, by 1906, had amassed thousands of objects from available collections, donors and new discoveries. This was the core of the museum, which contained objects ranging from the excavated and natural to decorative art and ethnography. Important materials owned by the Lincoln Cathedral and the Lincoln Mechanical Institute, and earlier collections which had never been publicly recognised, were under one roof at the museum. Smith retired in 1935, and in 1974 the Usher Gallery was considered the county's archaeological museum.

== Modern art programme ==
Three-dimensional scanning technology, which enables the capture of an object's form of and its storage as a digital file, is closing the gap between physical and digital objects. Essential museum activities, such as collecting, management, conservation, research and the presentation of a collection to the public, are focal points of 3D technological research. 3D printing was used in 2012, when Lincoln decided that the gallery would house contemporary art. The gallery's 3D scanning project was implemented by artist Oliver Laric, who suggested that 3D models could be downloaded as STL files without copyright limitations. The scanning project can be used for several materials, including ceramics, paper, and metal. Although 3D scans can be downloaded from the gallery's website, they are not a substitute for the artistic work.

== Collections ==
The gallery displays a range of objects, including examples of modern and contemporary visual art, portrait and landscape paintings, sculpture, paper works, photographs, and decorative art. It has two floors; the first floor is a temporary-exhibition gallery, and the ground floor displays objects from the permanent collection. Examples include the portrait of Joseph Banks by American artist Benjamin West, views of Lincoln by L. S. Lowry, and modern works by John Piper. The gallery's sculpture collections include a tree-ring sculpture by Edward Allington, and the decorative-arts collection contains ceramics, glass, silver enamel and jewellery. Paintings include portraits of unknown ladies.

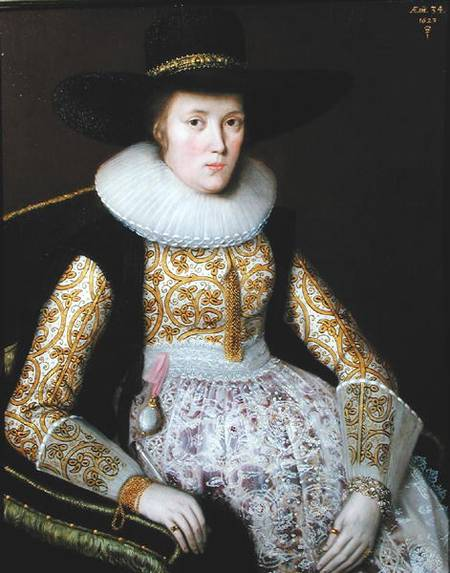
Robert Peake the Elder, unknown lady (1623)

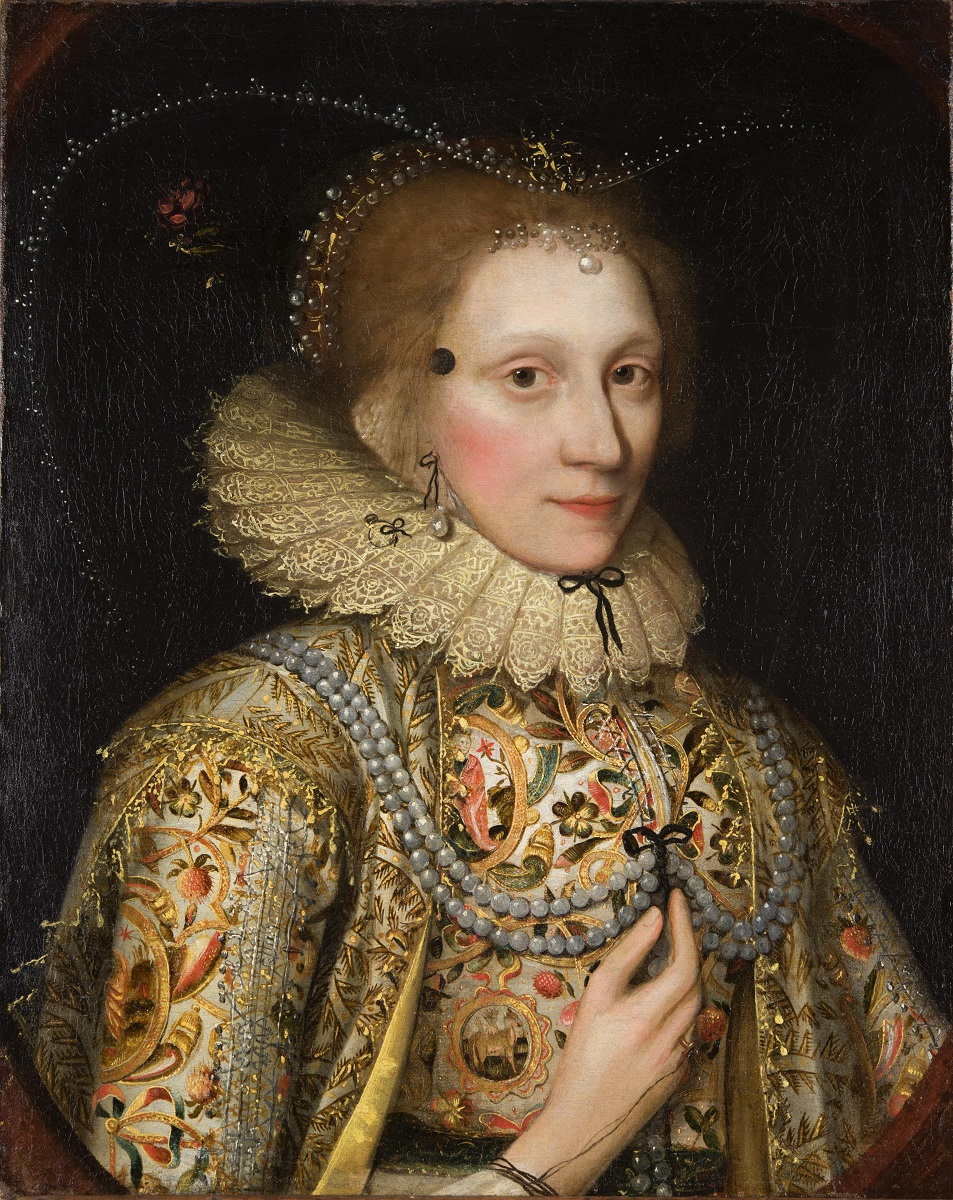
Circle of Robert Peake the Elder, Portrait of a Lady Wearing a Patch (c. 1619–1621)

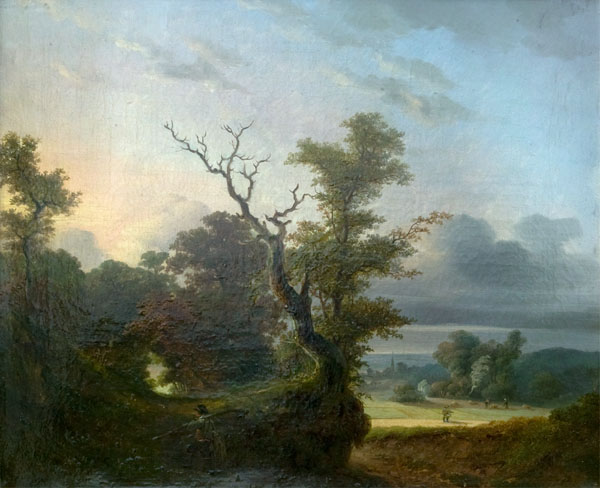
Landscape with Tree (c. 1695–1702), attributed to Lodewijk van Schoor

=== Donations ===
The artworks and artefacts are as a result of the generosity of organisations and people over the past decade, and the museum is grateful to all those who have contributed. The collection of artworks and objects is guided by a collection-development strategy. The museum is always ready to discuss offers of donations. The fine-art collection has continued to grow along with the decorative-arts collection because of the contributions made through bequests, gifts, commissions, and purchases. Generous grants have led to the growth of the decorative-arts collection. Organisations and local people have assembled collections of watches, porcelain, and miniatures.

== Activities ==
=== Education ===
The gallery is conducting an educational programme. The Museum Apprentice Activity offers children aged 5–11 art workshops during long school holidays or a half-term of Saturdays. Gallery staff also provide resources and professional services. Children with special educational needs and adults are also accepted by a dedicated course designer.

=== Archaeological-project archives ===
The museum has long been associated with the archaeological inquiry, research, and survey, and the Lincoln Archaeological Committee was the first organised body to study Lincoln's early history in 1945. Most of the early surveys, local investigations, and archaeological projects are carried out at this museum by universities, private researchers, and archaeological contractors. People with inquiries about archaeological fieldwork are asked to consult the Archeological Archives Deposition Guidelines, which contain the processes and requirements for depositing archaeological projects in the archives.

=== Modern and contemporary art programme ===
In 1946, the gallery founded a programme which invites contemporary artists and curators to showcase their work (including modern British art). Contemporary artists were invited to curate Arts Council Collection displays in 2013. Modern masters whose work was displayed the following year included Pablo Picasso, Andy Warhol, Henri Matisse, and Salvador Dalí.

=== Funding ===
Most support for the gallery has come from organisations who provide resources and funding for its activities. The contemporary-art programme received a significant financial contribution from the Arts Council England. Most of the permanent artworks have been purchased by a group of long-standing partners known as the Art Fund. Academic partners, such as Bishop Grosseteste University College Lincoln, have also helped to support the gallery's educational programme. The Arts Council supports the gallery's temporary collections.

=== Proposals for partial closure ===
In January 2019, Lincolnshire County Council proposals to use part of the gallery for celebrations (such as weddings) and move some of its collection to a neighbouring museum were criticised as making the art less accessible. According to a Lincolnshire county councillor, the proposals would have helped to reduce the council's heritage budget by about £750,000 per year. Following discussions between the county council and the City of Lincoln Council, the Usher Gallery will remain open but the lease will be amended to enable third-party hire and ceremonies, and Lincoln's museum and art collections will remain in Lincolnshire.

Following the controversy in 2019, a 2021 agreement between Lincolnshire county and the City of Lincoln Council secured the galleries future. Since 2023 it has been integrated into the rebranded Lincoln Museum complex. The building now functions as dual-use venue, hosting weddings and ceremonies alongside its permanent art collection to ensure financial sustainability.

=== Recent exhibitions ===
Sources:

- Community Choice, 10 June – 8 October 2023
- Re:Collection – exhibition of works by MA Fine Art students from the University of Lincoln, 29 April – 3 June 2023
- David Remfry: A Moment Captured, 28 January – 1 May 2023
- Best Art Vinyl: Album Artwork Through the Ages, 22 October 2022 – 22 January 2023
- Usher Open Exhibitions: Art Out of Isolation, 1 October 2022 – 8 January 2023
- Microworld: Lincoln, 9 July – 2 October 2022
- Lincolnshire Artists' Society Summer Exhibition 2022
- Rachel Carter: Pilgrim Woman, 20 November 2022 – 2 January 2022
- Laura Wilson, Old Salt, 20 May 2021 – 23 August 2021
