= Lincoln Imp =

Grotesque on a wall inside Lincoln Cathedral, England

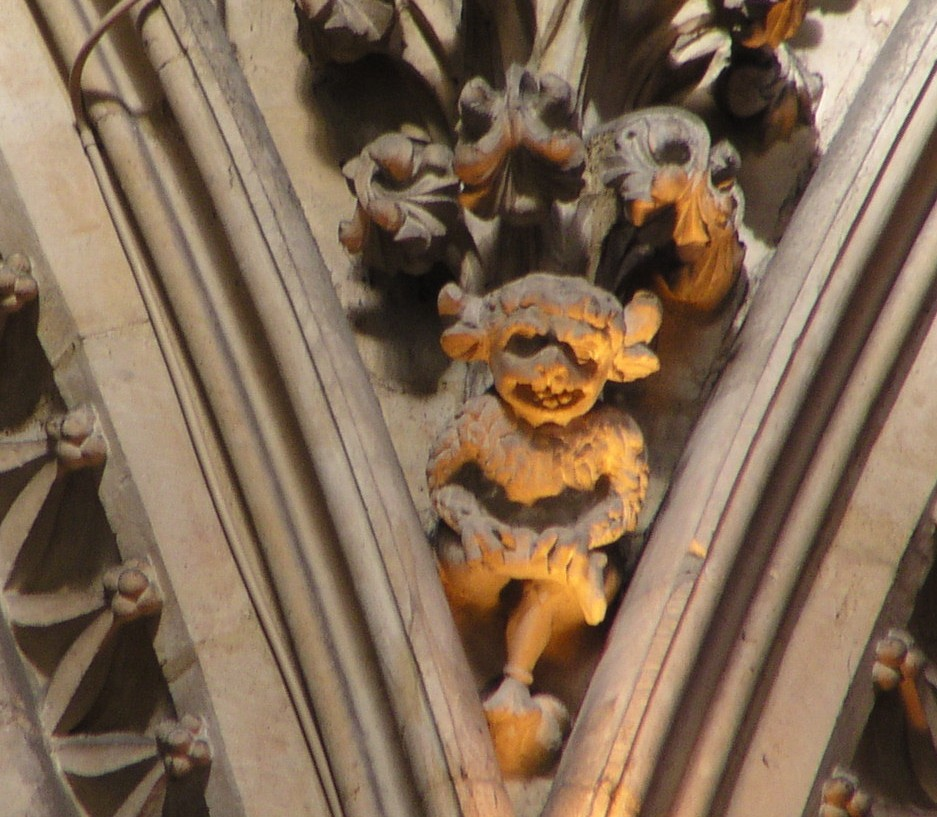
The Lincoln Imp

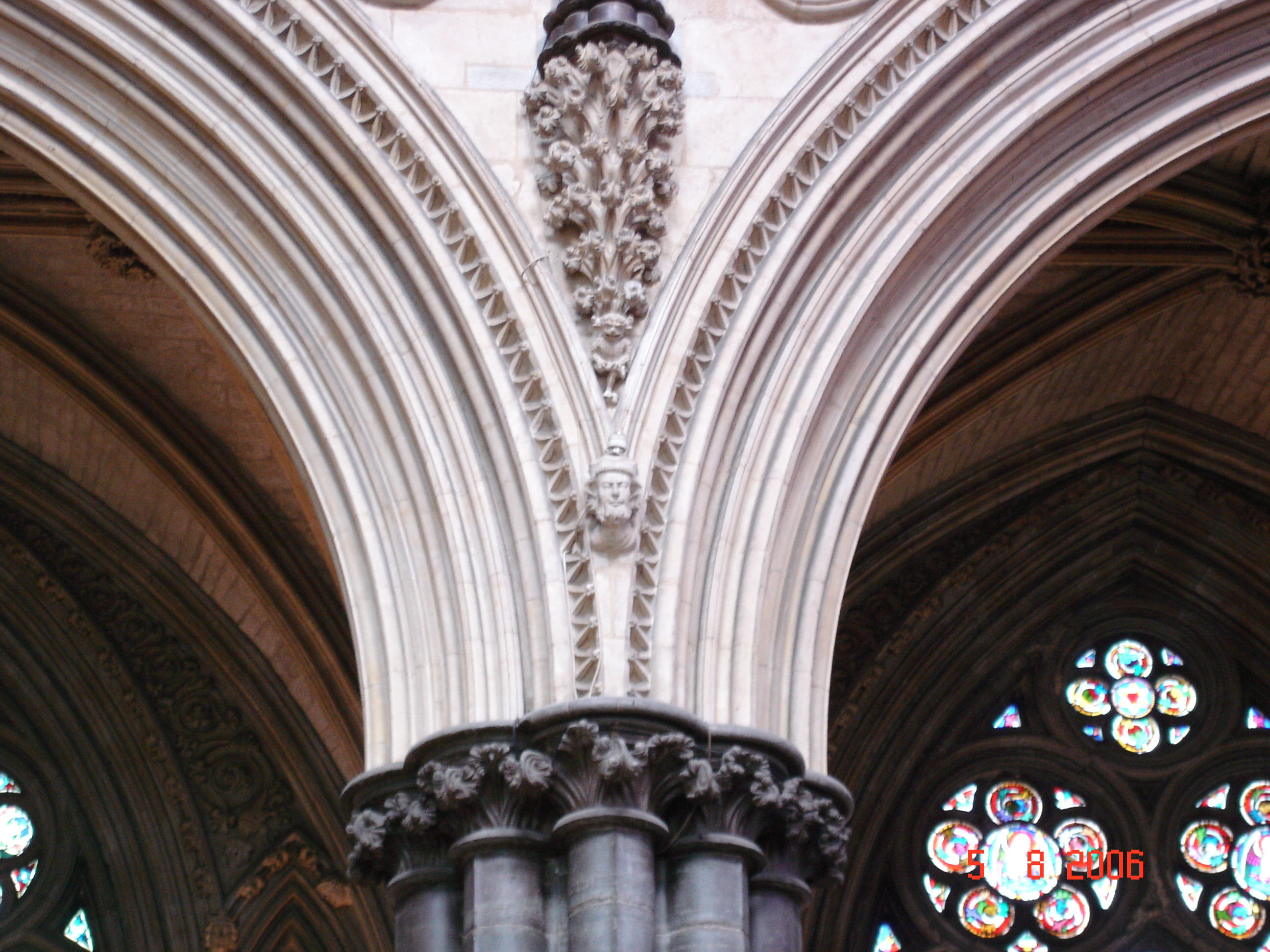
The Lincoln Imp is located at the bottom of the upper V.

The Lincoln Imp is a grotesque on a wall inside Lincoln Cathedral, England, and it has become the symbol of the city of Lincoln. The carving is situated high on the north side of the Angel Choir and is not conspicuous. The Angel Choir was built between 1250 and 1280, so the carving must date from then. It became well known in the late nineteenth century, and its associated folk tales are an elaboration of earlier traditions involving the devil hiding from wind inside the cathedral, the devil looking at Lincoln with malicious envy, and stone sculptures (at Lincoln Cathedral or Lincoln College, Oxford) said to represent either theme.

== History ==
A 1780 guide to early English sculpture by John Carter had a section on "Antiquities from Lincoln". It made no mention of the imp but had an illustration of "A Sculpture projecting over the angle of a Turret of the South Porch of the Cathedral. 'Tis called by the inhabitants, the 'Devil on the Witch's back, looking over Lincoln'." Guides to the cathedral published in 1837 and 1856 also mentioned this exterior sculpture, and made no mention of the imp. An 1869 book by Richard John King did mention the imp carving, though not by nickname. "The grotesque below the second corbel on the north side (counting from the east—it is in the retro-choir) represents an elf with large ears, and may perhaps be regarded as illustrating the mediaeval folk-lore."

The nickname "Lincoln Imp" arose some time before 1897, when it featured in a pamphlet by Arnold Frost (real name G. T. Hemsley), containing his poem "The Ballad of the Wind, the Devil and Lincoln Minster". Frost said it was based on an "old Lincolnshire legend" that had "not hitherto appeared in print". He said it had been told to him "some five or six years ago by a North Lincolnshire man, sixty years of age, who, as a boy, had heard his father relate it." Frost summarised the legend:

The coming of Bishop Remigius to Lincoln made the devil very angry, for up to that time he had had it all his own way in the town and district. The devil tried his utmost to turn him from his purpose of building a Cathedral, but without success. At last in desperation — the Minster then nearing its completion — the devil waylaid the bishop at the south-western corner of the building and tried to kill him. But the good prelate in his extremity called for aid upon the Blessed Virgin Mary — to whom the Church was to be dedicated — whereupon, the Blessed Virgin sent a mighty rushing wind, which, catching the devil, so hustled and buffeted him, that he slipped inside the Church for safety, where he has been ever since, nor dare he come out, knowing that the wind awaits his return in order to make an end of him.

The legend made no mention of a stone carving. That was Frost’s own addition, in the last part of his poem:

The bishop we know died long ago.

The wind still waits, nor will he go
Till he has a chance of beating his foe;
But the devil hopp'd up without a limp.
And at once took shape as the “Lincoln Imp.”
And there he sits a'top of the column,
And grins at the people who gaze so solemn;
Moreover, he mocks at the wind below.

And says, “you may wait till doomsday, O !

Frost was aware of a problem of chronology: the imp carving was made two centuries after Remigius founded the cathedral. He wrote in a footnote: “it is natural to suppose the devil would shift his quarters from time to time, choosing with each remove the most beautiful portion of the Cathedral as his particular stall!”

Frost’s introduction to the poem gave two other legends from published sources, linking the devil with Lincoln Cathedral (but not the imp). One ran as follows:

The wind and the devil being on a friendly tour, [they] arrived at Lincoln Minster, where the latter addressed his friend thus, ‘just wait outside here whilst I go in and have a chat with my friends the Dean and Canons.’ ‘All right,’ said the wind, and he has been waiting there ever since!

The other was a story about a proverbial expression, “looking as the devil over Lincoln”. It meant to regard something or someone with malicious envy, and can be dated at least as far back as 1562 (“Like as the diuel lookt oer Lincolne”). The expression was well known, used by writers including Pope, Swift and Scott. It was illustrated by George Cruikshank as a man with a grotesque expression.

Lincoln Cathedral stands in an exposed position, vulnerable to high winds, and its tall wood and timber spire was “blown down during a tempest in January 1547-8”. Seen as the work of a spiteful devil, this would explain both traditions. In a book published in 1748, Daniel Defoe wrote,

The Middle or Rood Tower is the highest in the whole Kingdom, and when the Spire was standing on it, it must, in Proportion to the Height of the Tower, have exceeded that of old St. Paul's, which was 520 Feet. The Monks were so proud of this Structure, that they would have it, that the Devil looked upon it with an envious Eye; whence the Proverb of a Man who looks invidious and malignant, He looks as the Devil over Lincoln.

Another explanation for the proverb linked it with a sculpture at Lincoln College, Oxford. Thomas Fuller discussed this in his Worthies of England (1662):

Some fetch the original of this Proverb from a stone picture of the Devil, which doth (or lately did) over-look Lincoln College… [however] it is conceived of more antiquity… [and] related originally to the Cathedral Church in Lincoln.

In Fuller’s view, the sculpture at Oxford had simply come to be seen as a humorous embodiment of the existing proverb. Frost was not aware of this history when he wrote his poem, but said he learned some of it while his pamphlet was in press, causing him to release a second edition, with a new introduction, five months later. There he wrote of “the notorious attempt made by ‘Oxford men’ to appropriate one more good thing from the City of Lincoln, namely, the cult of the ‘Lincoln Imp’.” He quoted Fuller as evidence against the “Oxford plagiarists” and provided “two other versions of the legend… from two widely different sources.” He did not specify what the sources were, but said “there is every reason to believe them genuine [though] neither version can boast a Lincolnshire origin.” One of them involved two imps rather than one, thus connecting the Angel Choir carving with the “devil on the witch’s back” sculpture at the south porch, and linking both with the theme of the wind:

The wind, one day, brought two imps to view the new Minster at Lincoln. Both imps were greatly impressed with the magnitude and beauty of the structure, and one of them, smitten by a fatal curiosity, slipped inside the building to see what was going on. His temerity, however, cost him dear, for he was so petrified with astonishment at the wonderful things he both saw and heard, that his heart became as stone within him, and he remained rooted to the ground. The other imp, full of grief at the loss of his brother, flew madly round about the minster, seeking in vain for the lost one. At length, being wearied out, he alighted, quite unwittingly, upon the shoulders of a certain witch, and was also, and in like manner, instantly turned to stone! But the wind still haunts the Minster precincts waiting their return, now hopelessly disconsolate ! and now raging with fury !

The other related to the “devil over Lincoln” theme:

When the Minster was nearing its completion, the devil, who had narrowly and jealously watched the good bishop's proceedings, at once took up his position as over-lord, saying with a grim smile, as he looked over Lincoln, "Ah! my good friend, all this is mine!

Frost produced a third edition of his pamphlet in June 1898, and in the same year his version of the imp legend was given far wider currency by being reproduced in ‘’The Magic of the Horseshoe’’ by the American writer Robert Means Lawrence.

An 1898 cathedral guidebook by A.F. Kendrick called the Lincoln Imp a “delightfully grotesque little specimen of ugliness” and “a characteristic record of the exuberant fancy of our mediaeval artists.” Kendrick also mentioned the south porch carving, calling it “an imp on the back of a witch”, plus another exterior sculpture that locals connected with the same tradition, above the south-east chapel next to St Hugh’s. “The gable of this chapel is worthy of notice. At the head of its tall central lancet is a grotesque figure, commonly pointed out as the ‘Devil looking over Lincoln’.”

The growing popularity of the Lincoln Imp led to a copy being installed at Oxford in 1899, replacing Lincoln College’s earlier claimant that had become damaged. The imp became famous in the early twentieth century as a good-luck charm after a wealthy local jeweller, James Ward Usher, secured sole rights to use its image on merchandise for a period of time. This was met by scepticism in some quarters, as shown by a letter to the magazine Notes and Queries, quoted in a 1908 book on Lincolnshire folklore:

A friend of mine informs me that, according to a ladies' fashion paper which she was reading not long ago, a trinket in the form of 'the Lincoln Imp' will prevent its wearer losing things. I am anxious to know whether this superstition has been made to order. It does not seem probable that it is veritable folk-lore, as no evidence is yet forthcoming that the quaint figure in the Minster which is known as ' the Imp' was originally intended to represent the devil, or till recent days had any connexion with the devil-legend of the city or other traditionary beliefs.

== Folk tales ==
Modern folk tales about the Lincoln Imp are mostly variations on the traditions described in the previous section. Reproduced in newspapers, tourist guides and websites, they are often presented as ancient legends, but lack definite pre-20th century sources. Visit Lincoln (a not for profit community interest company that sponsors tourism and investment) gives the story as follows:

Legend has it that one day the Devil was in a frolicsome mood, and sent two naughty creatures to cause mischief on Earth. After allegedly stopping at Chesterfield, twisting the spire of St Mary and All Saints Church, the two imps went to Lincoln to wreak havoc in the city's Cathedral. Upon arriving, the naughty imps went inside the cathedral and started to cause mayhem, knocking over the Dean, smashing the stained glass windows and destroying the lights. In a bid to put a stop to their antics, an angel was sent to warn the imps off causing any more chaos.

One of the imps hid underneath a table, whilst the other started throwing stones and rocks at the Angel in a final act of defiance - "Stop me if you can!" it cheekily retorted. In a moment of anger, the Angel turned the Imp to stone. He has remained in the same spot ever since, sitting cross-legged on top of the pillar overlooking the Angel Choir – a constant reminder of how good will always triumph over evil. Ever wondered why it's so windy outside the Cathedral? That's thought to be caused by the second Imp, waiting for his friend to return!

Head to Lincoln Cathedral and see the petrified Lincoln Imp high up for yourself - there's a spotlight to help you if you give in! You’ll also find imps across the city too: on door knockers, in gift shops and even in the nickname of the local football team - the Red Imps.

The Lincoln Cathedral shop sells a Lincoln Imp keyring, and the cathedral website tells this story:

One day, according to a very old legend, the Devil sent his imps out to play, and the wind blew two of them all the way to Lincoln. At first they were so awestruck by the splendour of the Cathedral that they were afraid to enter. But soon, one imp plucked up courage, flew into the Cathedral where he tried to trip up the Lord Bishop, and to knock down the Dean, and teased the Vergers and Choir. When he started to break windows the Angels told him to stop his wicked doings; he cheekily replied "Stop me if you can!" Whereupon he was at once turned into stone, and made to sit for evermore in a cleft in the Angel Choir.

The Lincoln Imp is the best known of all the grotesque carved figures in the Cathedral. Its half human, half animal form was probably meant to represent the devil – a popular theme for sculptors of the thirteenth century. The stone figure of the Imp is about 12 inches high, and sits cross-legged high up between two arches on the north side of the Choir.

There is also a "Grimsby Imp" story, a variation of the two-imp story originally told by Arnold Frost in 1898, but with the second character relocated to a different Lincolnshire church, Grimsby Minster. The Grimsby Imp has been spoken about since at least 2017 when it was mentioned by Paul Martin on the television show Flog It!

Everywhere you look, here, in Grimsby Minster, there's something to see. Little delights, little treats. Now, here in the south aisle, I've spotted something I want to show you. He's a little imp, he's known as the Grimsby Imp, and he's more than likely a stonemason's joke, and he's right up there. The figure is supporting the weight of the tower on his back like Atlas carrying the globe. Now, it's thought, legend has it, that he was one of two imps that escaped from Lincoln Cathedral, he found his way here, caused lots of mischief, was found out by the angels and turned into stone. But I've got another theory. I think it reflects the pride of the master stonemason, whose skills underpin the whole building. This has been here for centuries. It's going to remain here for many more centuries to come. I love it, absolutely love it.

In May 2021 an item in Grimsby Live, "The truth behind Grimsby's very own legendary imp", further expanded the story to include the twisted spire of Chesterfield Parish Church. It said a vicar at Grimsby Minster "has a more logical and historical explanation for the figure suggesting one of the craftsmen who built the Minster carved the figure of a man bending over supporting the church." In September 2021 North East Lincolnshire Council announced that Grimsby Minster was to be part of the "Lincoln Imp Trail", involving 32 painted sculptures inspired by the Lincoln Imp placed at various sites around Lincolnshire in a venture organised by the Lincoln Business Improvement Group. Grimsby Minster website makes no mention of the imp.

== Lincoln College, Oxford ==
An 1899 reproduction of the Lincoln Imp also overlooked the Front Quad of Lincoln College, Oxford until 2000 when it was transferred to the bar (Deep Hall) and another Imp was erected in the traditional position above the entrance to Hall.

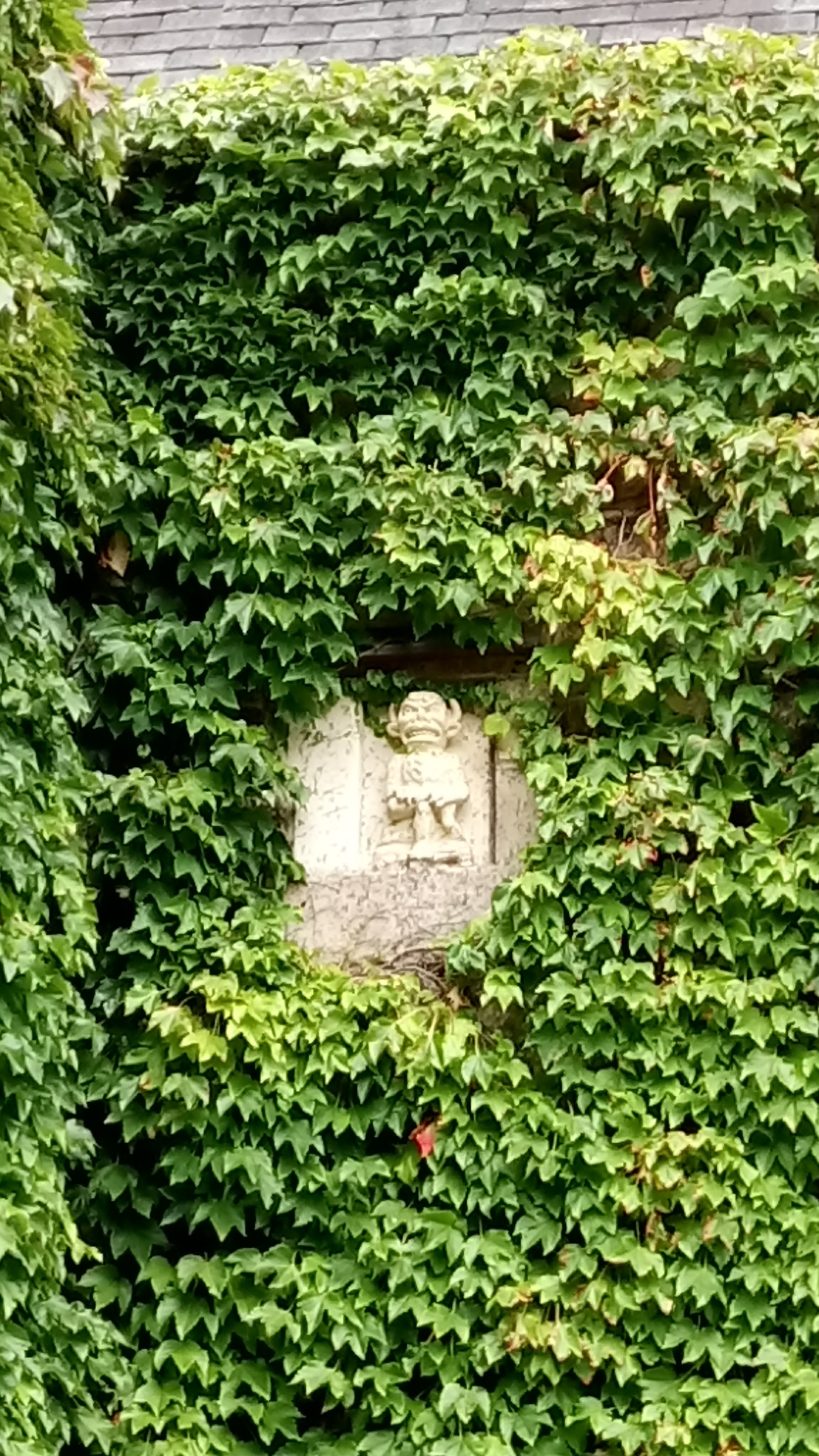
The Lincoln Imp at Lincoln College Oxford is a reference to the origins of the college, Lincoln.

This has given rise to a traditional Oxford expression: 'to look on someone like the Imp looks over Lincoln' (a variant of the older proverb discussed above) as well as giving rise to the title of the college's undergraduate newspaper: The Lincoln Imp. The Lincoln Imp is also the mascot of the college boat club, an image of which is used to decorate the oars and jerseys of the men's 1st VIII.

== Wider use of the image ==
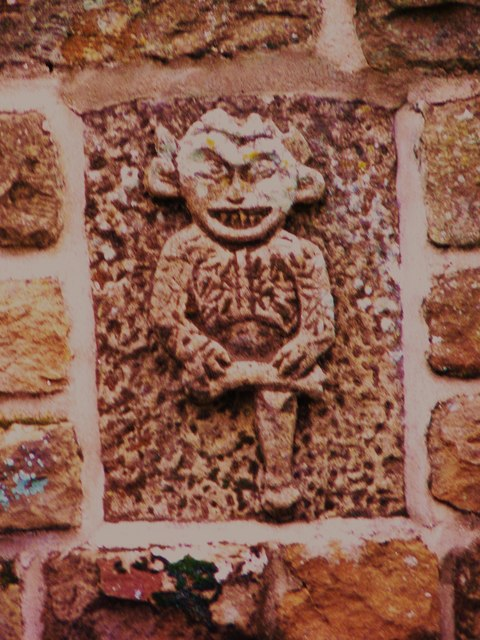
A carving of the Lincoln Imp on a house in Farndale, North Yorkshire

The Lincoln example is by far the best-known example. James Ward Usher, local businessman and philanthropist, obtained sole rights to use the image of the Lincoln Imp on jewellery, in the late 19th century, a venture which contributed greatly to his fame and wealth.

Lincoln City Football Club are nicknamed 'The Imps'. An image of the Lincoln Imp appears on their crest, and 'Poacher the Imp' serves as club mascot. The Lincoln Imp also lends its name to the Gibraltar club Lincoln Red Imps F.C., and Lincoln Hockey Club share the nickname and crest design of their footballing counterparts.

The Lincoln Imp is the badge of No. LXI Squadron RAF.

Lincolnshire County Council use a green modern version of the imp on their logo.

== See also ==
- Cerne Abbas Giant
- Green Man
- Lincoln Cathedral
- The Grimsby Imp
