= Grade II* listed buildings in Lincoln =

There are over 20,000 Grade II* listed buildings in England. This page is a list of these buildings in the district of Lincoln in Lincolnshire.

== Lincoln ==
Name	Location	Type	Completed (Note: The date given is the date used by Historic England as significant for the initial building or that of an important part in the structure's description.)	Date designated	Grid ref. (Note: The grid reference is based on the British national grid reference system, sometimes known as OSGB36, used by the Ordnance Survey.) Geo-coordinates	Entry number (Note: The "List Entry Number" is a unique number assigned to each listed building and scheduled monument by Historic England.)	Image
Assize Courts	Lincoln	Assize Court	1823	8 October 1953	SK9743271900; 53°14′07″N 0°32′30″W	1388488	Assize Courts More images
Boundary Wall bordering Minster Yard to South from Number 16a to Number 17	Lincoln	Gate	c. 1855	8 October 1953	SK9777271762; 53°14′02″N 0°32′12″W	1388667	Upload Photo
Cantilupe Chantry North	Lincoln	House	18th century	2 October 1969	SK9783871749; 53°14′02″N 0°32′08″W	1388663	Cantilupe Chantry North More images
Church of St Benedict	Lincoln	Church	13th century	8 October 1953	SK9748071117; 53°13′41″N 0°32′28″W	1388746	Church of St Benedict More images
Church of St Helen	Boultham Park, Lincoln	Church	13th century	8 October 1953	SK9646069090; 53°12′36″N 0°33′26″W	1388566	Church of St Helen More images
Church of St John	Ermine, Lincoln	Church	1962–1963	19 January 1995	SK9808973285; 53°14′51″N 0°31′53″W	1388800	Church of St John More images
Church of St Swithin	Lincoln	Church	Roman	18 July 1973	SK9774271227; 53°13′45″N 0°32′14″W	1388543	Church of St Swithin More images
Conduit 20 Metres South West of Church of St Mary Le Wigford	Lincoln	Conduit	c. 1540	8 October 1953	SK9746770952; 53°13′36″N 0°32′29″W	1388598	Conduit 20 Metres South West of Church of St Mary Le Wigford More images
County Assembly Rooms	Lincoln	Assembly Rooms	1744	8 October 1953	SK9767171980; 53°14′09″N 0°32′17″W	1388454	County Assembly Rooms More images
Deloraine Court East and Deloraine Court West	Lincoln	House	c. 1300	8 October 1953	SK9772471949; 53°14′08″N 0°32′14″W	1388609	Deloraine Court East and Deloraine Court West More images
Dernstall House	Lincoln	House	17th century	1 April 1965	SK9759771499; 53°13′54″N 0°32′22″W	1388814	Dernstall House More images
24, Eastgate (previously D'Isney Place Hotel) and attached Railing	Lincoln	House	1736	8 October 1953	SK9802571911; 53°14′07″N 0°31′58″W	1388536	24, Eastgate (previously D'Isney Place Hotel) and attached Railing More images
Edward King House and Diocesan Offices and attached Chapel	Lincoln	Bishops Palace	1727	8 October 1953	SK9775271695; 53°14′00″N 0°32′13″W	1388681	Edward King House and Diocesan Offices and attached Chapel More images
Ellis's Mill	Lincoln	Tower Mill	1798	18 July 1973	SK9709272222; 53°14′17″N 0°32′48″W	1388647	Ellis's Mill More images
Governor's House and Old Prison and Chapel and Exercise Yard and Enclosing Wall	Lincoln	Prison Governors House	1787	8 October 1953	SK9750471837; 53°14′05″N 0°32′26″W	1388489	Governor's House and Old Prison and Chapel and Exercise Yard and Enclosing Wall More images
Graveley Place and adjoining Garden Wall	Lincoln	House	Early 14th century	8 October 1953	SK9796771777; 53°14′02″N 0°32′01″W	1388657	Graveley Place and adjoining Garden Wall More images
Judges Lodging and attached Railing	Lincoln	Railings	c. 1810	9 October 1953	SK9760571830; 53°14′04″N 0°32′21″W	1388484	Judges Lodging and attached Railing More images
Leigh-Pemberton House	Lincoln	Jettied House	c. 1543	8 October 1953	SK9763471824; 53°14′04″N 0°32′19″W	1388487	Leigh-Pemberton House More images
Alive Church	Lincoln	Church Hall	1973	15 August 1973	SK9734671288; 53°13′47″N 0°32′35″W	1388720	Alive Church More images
Romanesque Door Arch in the former Lincoln Arms Public House	Lincoln	House	12th century	24 September 1986	SK9728670446; 53°13′20″N 0°32′40″W	1388602	Upload Photo
The Lawn	Lincoln	Psychiatric Hospital	1820	2 October 1969	SK9728371873; 53°14′06″N 0°32′38″W	1388819	The Lawn More images
The Subdeanery and East Midlands Tourist Board Offices	Lincoln	Deanery	1999	8 October 1953	SK9767871782; 53°14′03″N 0°32′17″W	1388668	The Subdeanery and East Midlands Tourist Board Offices More images
Usher Art Gallery	Lincoln	Art Gallery	1926–1927	15 August 1973	SK9778271561; 53°13′56″N 0°32′12″W	1388632	Usher Art Gallery More images
3 Bailgate	Lincoln	House	Early to mid 18th century	2 October 1969	SK9763871838; 53°14′05″N 0°32′19″W	1385394	3 Bailgate More images
6 Lindum Road	Lincoln	House	Late 18th century	15 August 1973	SK9779571494; 53°13′53″N 0°32′11″W	1388620	6 Lindum Road More images
3 and 3a Pottergate	Lincoln	House	17th century	8 October 1953	SK9800071732; 53°14′01″N 0°32′00″W	1388735	3 and 3a Pottergate More images
4 Pottergate	Lincoln	House	14th century	8 October 1953	SK9799471741; 53°14′01″N 0°32′00″W	1388736	4 Pottergate More images
3 Minster Yard and adjoining Area Wall	Lincoln	House	17th century	8 October 1953	SK9790671862; 53°14′05″N 0°32′05″W	1388651	3 Minster Yard and adjoining Area Wall More images
7 and 8 Minster Yard	Lincoln	House	16th century	8 October 1953	SK9792771827; 53°14′04″N 0°32′03″W	1388654	7 and 8 Minster Yard More images
13 Minster Yard	Lincoln	House	c. 1736	8 October 1953	SK9794571747; 53°14′01″N 0°32′03″W	1388658	13 Minster Yard More images
15 Minster Yard	Lincoln	House	c. 1811	8 October 1953	SK9788071730; 53°14′01″N 0°32′06″W	1388661	15 Minster Yard More images
20 Minster Yard	Lincoln	Apartment	1953	8 October 1953	SK9769271831; 53°14′04″N 0°32′16″W	1388670	20 Minster Yard More images
21 Minster Yard	Lincoln	House	Early 18th century	8 October 1953	SK9770071840; 53°14′05″N 0°32′16″W	1388671	21 Minster Yard More images
22 Minster Yard	Lincoln	House	Early 18th century	8 October 1953	SK9770671847; 53°14′05″N 0°32′15″W	1388672	22 Minster Yard More images
23 Minster Yard	Lincoln	House	Early 18th century	8 October 1953	SK9771371854; 53°14′05″N 0°32′15″W	1388673	23 Minster Yard More images
1 Castle Hill	Lincoln	House	Mid 18th century	8 October 1953	SK9762471796; 53°14′03″N 0°32′20″W	1388481	1 Castle Hill More images
6 and 7 Castle Hill	Lincoln	House	Early 18th century	8 October 1953	SK9762271825; 53°14′04″N 0°32′20″W	1388486	6 and 7 Castle Hill More images
268 High Street	Lincoln	Timber Framed House	Late 15th century	8 October 1953	SK9760071482; 53°13′53″N 0°32′22″W	1388582	268 High Street More images
2 Exchequergate	Lincoln	House	Late 15th century	2 October 1969	SK9765771801; 53°14′03″N 0°32′18″W	1388539	2 Exchequergate
20, 21 and 22 Steep Hill	Lincoln	Jettied House	15th century	8 October 1953	SK9764171700; 53°14′00″N 0°32′19″W	1388778	20, 21 and 22 Steep Hill More images
