= Listed buildings in Lincoln, England =

Non-Civil Parish in Lincolnshire, England

Lincoln is a cathedral city and district in Lincolnshire, England. It contains 447 listed buildings that are recorded in the National Heritage List for England. Of these eight are grade I, 103 are grade II* and 336 are grade II.

This list is based on the information retrieved online from Historic England.

== Key ==
Grade	Criteria
I	Buildings that are of exceptional interest
II*	Particularly important buildings of more than special interest
II	Buildings that are of special interest

== Listing ==
Name	Grade	Location	Type	Completed (Note: The date given is the date used by Historic England as significant for the initial building or that of an important part in the structure's description.)	Grid ref. (Note: The grid reference is based on the British national grid reference system, sometimes known as OSGB36, used by the Ordnance Survey.) Geo-coordinates	Notes	Entry number (Note: The "List Entry Number" is a unique number assigned to each listed building and scheduled monument by Historic England.)	Image	Wikidata
Summerhouse 70 Metres West of Number 34	II	Bailgate			SK9761572020; 53°14′10″N 0°32′20″W		1388443	Upload Photo	
Stable and Pigeoncote 20 Metres North East of the Lion and Snake Public House	II	Bailgate			SK9766771946; 53°14′08″N 0°32′17″W		1388456	Stable and Pigeoncote 20 Metres North East of the Lion and Snake Public House More images	Q26667995
Roman Well and Part of Forum Wall	I	Bailgate			SK9762871958; 53°14′08″N 0°32′19″W		1388460	Upload Photo	Q17526550
White Hart Hotel	II	Bailgate			SK9766871846; 53°14′05″N 0°32′17″W		1388461	White Hart Hotel More images	Q26667999
Base of North Gate Bastion Attached to Number 50 (number 50 Not Included)	I	Bailgate			SK9764572125; 53°14′14″N 0°32′18″W		1388462	Upload Photo	Q17526556
K6 Telephone Kiosk	II	Bailgate			SK9763671955; 53°14′08″N 0°32′19″W		1392404	K6 Telephone Kiosk More images	
2, Bailgate	II	2, Bailgate			SK9763671832; 53°14′04″N 0°32′19″W		1385393	2, Bailgate More images	
3, Bailgate	II*	3, Bailgate			SK9763871838; 53°14′05″N 0°32′19″W		1385394	3, Bailgate More images	Q17548892
4, Bailgate	II	4, Bailgate			SK9764071843; 53°14′05″N 0°32′19″W		1385395	4, Bailgate More images	Q26665181
5, Bailgate	II	5, Bailgate			SK9763971848; 53°14′05″N 0°32′19″W		1385396	5, Bailgate More images	Q26665182
6 and 7, Bailgate	II	6 and 7, Bailgate			SK9764071854; 53°14′05″N 0°32′19″W		1385397	6 and 7, Bailgate More images	Q26665183
8, Bailgate	II	8, Bailgate			SK9763771863; 53°14′05″N 0°32′19″W		1385398	8, Bailgate More images	
9 and 10, Bailgate	II	9 and 10, Bailgate			SK9763771872; 53°14′06″N 0°32′19″W		1385399	9 and 10, Bailgate More images	
12a, Bailgate	II	12a, Bailgate			SK9763471884; 53°14′06″N 0°32′19″W		1385400	12a, Bailgate More images	
14, Bailgate	II	14, Bailgate			SK9763271890; 53°14′06″N 0°32′19″W		1388432	14, Bailgate More images	Q26667972
15, Bailgate	II	15, Bailgate			SK9763171895; 53°14′06″N 0°32′19″W		1388433	15, Bailgate More images	
16, Bailgate	II	16, Bailgate			SK9763171906; 53°14′07″N 0°32′19″W		1388434	16, Bailgate More images	Q26667974
17, Bailgate	II	17, Bailgate			SK9763071912; 53°14′07″N 0°32′19″W		1388435	Upload Photo	Q26667975
18, Bailgate	II	18, Bailgate			SK9763071920; 53°14′07″N 0°32′19″W		1388436	Upload Photo	
23 and 24, Bailgate, 2, Westgate	II	23 and 24, Bailgate, 2, Westgate			SK9763871974; 53°14′09″N 0°32′19″W		1388437	Upload Photo	
25 and 26, Bailgate	II	25 and 26, Bailgate			SK9764171985; 53°14′09″N 0°32′19″W		1388438	Upload Photo	
27 and 29, Bailgate	II	27 and 29, Bailgate			SK9764471994; 53°14′10″N 0°32′19″W		1388439	Upload Photo	
30, Bailgate	II	30, Bailgate			SK9764472005; 53°14′10″N 0°32′19″W		1388440	Upload Photo	
31, 32 and 33, Bailgate	II	31, 32 and 33, Bailgate			SK9764672019; 53°14′10″N 0°32′18″W		1388441	Upload Photo	Q26667982
34, Bailgate	II	34, Bailgate			SK9764972029; 53°14′11″N 0°32′18″W		1388442	Upload Photo	
35 and 36, Bailgate	II	35 and 36, Bailgate			SK9764972040; 53°14′11″N 0°32′18″W		1388444	Upload Photo	
37, Bailgate	II	37, Bailgate			SK9765072047; 53°14′11″N 0°32′18″W		1388445	Upload Photo	
38, 39 and 40, Bailgate	II	38, 39 and 40, Bailgate			SK9765072058; 53°14′12″N 0°32′18″W		1388446	Upload Photo	Q26667987
Dw Hotel Bar and Restaurant	II	44, Bailgate			SK9764172079; 53°14′12″N 0°32′19″W		1388447	Upload Photo	Q26667988
Greet Cottage	II	45, Bailgate			SK9764872087; 53°14′13″N 0°32′18″W		1388448	Upload Photo	Q26667989
46 and 47, Bailgate	II	46 and 47, Bailgate			SK9764972095; 53°14′13″N 0°32′18″W		1388449	Upload Photo	Q26667990
Number 52 and Adjoining Newport Arch	I	52, Bailgate			SK9767072132; 53°14′14″N 0°32′17″W		1388450	Number 52 and Adjoining Newport Arch More images	
58-63, Bailgate	II	58-63, Bailgate			SK9767672064; 53°14′12″N 0°32′17″W		1388451	Upload Photo	
69, 71 and 72, Bailgate	II	69, 71 and 72, Bailgate			SK9766672015; 53°14′10″N 0°32′17″W		1388452	Upload Photo	
73, 74 and 75, Bailgate	II	73, 74 and 75, Bailgate			SK9766371998; 53°14′10″N 0°32′18″W		1388453	73, 74 and 75, Bailgate More images	
County Assembly Rooms	II*	76, Bailgate			SK9767171980; 53°14′09″N 0°32′17″W		1388454	County Assembly Rooms More images	
Lion and Snake Public House	II	79, Bailgate			SK9764971935; 53°14′08″N 0°32′18″W		1388455	Lion and Snake Public House More images	
80 and 81, Bailgate	II	80 and 81, Bailgate			SK9765171922; 53°14′07″N 0°32′18″W		1388457	80 and 81, Bailgate More images	
82, 83 and 84, Bailgate	II	82, 83 and 84, Bailgate			SK9765071914; 53°14′07″N 0°32′18″W		1388458	82, 83 and 84, Bailgate More images	Q26667997
85, 86 and 87, Bailgate	II	85, 86 and 87, Bailgate			SK9764771903; 53°14′07″N 0°32′19″W		1388459	Upload Photo	
7, Bank Street	II	7, Bank Street			SK9765671261; 53°13′46″N 0°32′19″W		1388463	Upload Photo	Q26668000
St Swithin's House	II	8, Bank Street			SK9766071253; 53°13′46″N 0°32′19″W		1388464	Upload Photo	Q26668001
Beaumont Manor	II	Beaumont Fee			SK9739171446; 53°13′52″N 0°32′33″W		1388468	Upload Photo	Q26668005
3, Beaumont Fee	II	3, Beaumont Fee			SK9742671407; 53°13′51″N 0°32′31″W		1388465	Upload Photo	
22, Beaumont Fee	II	22, Beaumont Fee			SK9739371618; 53°13′58″N 0°32′33″W		1388466	22, Beaumont Fee More images	Q26668003
The Cottage	II	22a, Beaumont Fee			SK9737171644; 53°13′58″N 0°32′34″W		1388467	Upload Photo	
Church of All Saints	I	Brant Road, Bracebridge			SK9681667902; 53°11′58″N 0°33′08″W		1388470	Upload Photo	
263, Brant Road	II	263, Brant Road, Bracebridge			SK9654866827; 53°11′23″N 0°33′23″W		1388469	Upload Photo	Q26668006
East Holmes Signal Box	II	Brayford Wharf East			SK9726271032; 53°13′39″N 0°32′40″W		1391954	Upload Photo	
Lincolnshire Motor Company Showrooms	II	Brayford Wharf North			SK9722471236; 53°13′45″N 0°32′42″W		1392689	Upload Photo	
Former Drill Hall and Adjoining House	II	Broadgate			SK9774971303; 53°13′47″N 0°32′14″W		1388471	Upload Photo	Q15242381
Greyfriars' Museum	I	Broadgate			SK9775971248; 53°13′45″N 0°32′13″W		1388472	Greyfriars' Museum More images	Q99735905
The Lincolnshire Poacher Public House and Attached Boundary Wall	II	84, Bunkers Hill			TF0000773044; 53°14′42″N 0°30′10″W		1388473	Upload Photo	
Museum of Lincolnshire Life	II	Burton Road			SK9724872194; 53°14′16″N 0°32′40″W		1388474	Upload Photo	Q45319308
Chaplin Arms Public House	II	Canwick Road			SK9801570240; 53°13′13″N 0°32′01″W		1388476	Upload Photo	
Former Chapels at the Old Cemetery	II	Canwick Road			SK9829670020; 53°13′05″N 0°31′46″W		1388477	Upload Photo	Q26668010
Lodge and Adjoining Outbuilding at the Old Cemetery	II	Canwick Road			SK9807670111; 53°13′08″N 0°31′57″W		1388478	Upload Photo	
Mortuary on North Side of the Old Cemetery	II	Canwick Road			SK9824870170; 53°13′10″N 0°31′48″W		1388479	Upload Photo	
Toll Bar Lodge	II	Canwick Road			SK9818069976; 53°13′04″N 0°31′52″W		1388480	Upload Photo	Q26668013
85, Canwick Road	II	85, Canwick Road			SK9792070448; 53°13′19″N 0°32′05″W		1388475	Upload Photo	
K6 Telephone Kiosk at South East Corner of Judges' Lodging	II	Castle Hill			SK9761871821; 53°14′04″N 0°32′20″W		1388485	K6 Telephone Kiosk at South East Corner of Judges' Lodging More images	
Assize Courts	II*	Castle Hill			SK9743271900; 53°14′07″N 0°32′30″W		1388488	Assize Courts More images	Q17548921
Governor's House and Old Prison and Chapel and Exercise Yard and Enclosing Wall	II*	Castle Hill			SK9750471837; 53°14′05″N 0°32′26″W		1388489	Governor's House and Old Prison and Chapel and Exercise Yard and Enclosing Wall More images	Q17548926
Eleanor Cross Fragment 5 Metres East of the Governor's House	II	Castle Hill			SK9752571829; 53°14′04″N 0°32′25″W		1388490	Upload Photo	Q26668017
Lincoln Castle	I	Castle Hill			SK9756571832; 53°14′04″N 0°32′23″W		1388491	Lincoln Castle More images	
Bath House Inside North Wall of Lincoln Castle	II	Castle Hill			SK9750071934; 53°14′08″N 0°32′26″W		1388492	Upload Photo	Q26668018
Statue of George III 30 Metres South of North Wall of Lincoln Castle	II	Castle Hill			SK9750771914; 53°14′07″N 0°32′26″W		1388493	Upload Photo	Q26668019
1, Castle Hill	II*	1, Castle Hill			SK9762471796; 53°14′03″N 0°32′20″W		1388481	1, Castle Hill More images	Q17548900
3, Castle Hill	II	3, Castle Hill			SK9761671796; 53°14′03″N 0°32′20″W		1388482	3, Castle Hill More images	
Castle Hill Club	II	4, Castle Hill			SK9759671798; 53°14′03″N 0°32′21″W		1388483	Castle Hill Club More images	
Judges Lodging and Attached Railing	II*	5, Castle Hill			SK9760571830; 53°14′04″N 0°32′21″W		1388484	Judges Lodging and Attached Railing More images	
6 and 7, Castle Hill	II*	6 and 7, Castle Hill			SK9762271825; 53°14′04″N 0°32′20″W		1388486	6 and 7, Castle Hill More images	
Leigh-Pemberton House	II*	8, Castle Hill			SK9763471824; 53°14′04″N 0°32′19″W		1388487	Leigh-Pemberton House More images	Q6519504
Water Tower	II	Chapel Lane			SK9747172058; 53°14′12″N 0°32′28″W		1388494	Water Tower More images	Q108684839
Church of St Michael on the Mount	II	Christ Hospital Terrace			SK9769571685; 53°14′00″N 0°32′16″W		1388497	Upload Photo	Q26668023
Former Bluecoat School	II	Christ Hospital Terrace			SK9768471734; 53°14′01″N 0°32′17″W		1388498	Upload Photo	Q26668024
4 and 4a, Christ Hospital Terrace	II	4 and 4a, Christ Hospital Terrace			SK9766471729; 53°14′01″N 0°32′18″W		1388495	4 and 4a, Christ Hospital Terrace More images	
Hilton Cottage and Adjoining Wall and Railing	II	5, Christ Hospital Terrace			SK9765371714; 53°14′01″N 0°32′18″W		1388496	Hilton Cottage and Adjoining Wall and Railing More images	Q26668022
Theatre Royal	II	Clasketgate			SK9762271408; 53°13′51″N 0°32′20″W		1388499	Upload Photo	Q7777434
Market Building	II	Cornhill			SK9759371058; 53°13′39″N 0°32′22″W		1388502	Upload Photo	Q26668028
2-5, Cornhill	II	2-5, Cornhill			SK9753171065; 53°13′40″N 0°32′26″W		1388500	Upload Photo	Q26668026
St Hughes Chambers	II	15-17, Corporation Street			SK9752171380; 53°13′50″N 0°32′26″W		1391953	Upload Photo	
49, 51 and 53, Danesgate	II	49, 51 and 53, Danesgate			SK9773271616; 53°13′57″N 0°32′14″W		1388503	Upload Photo	
Steep Hill House	II	59 and 61, Danesgate			SK9766071646; 53°13′58″N 0°32′18″W		1388504	Upload Photo	Q26668030
Archway Attached to Number 14 Castle Villa (number 14 Not Included)	II	Drury Lane			SK9749271753; 53°14′02″N 0°32′27″W		1388506	Upload Photo	Q26668032
Wash House 2 Metres North of Number 14 Castle Villa (number 14 Not Included)	II	Drury Lane			SK9749271761; 53°14′02″N 0°32′27″W		1388507	Upload Photo	Q26668033
Chad Varah House (former Lincoln Theological College, Attached Chapel, Water Tower And House)	II	Drury Lane, LN1 3BP			SK9757071730; 53°14′01″N 0°32′23″W		1388510	Upload Photo	
1-4, Drury Lane	II	1-4, Drury Lane			SK9757071769; 53°14′02″N 0°32′23″W		1388505	1-4, Drury Lane More images	Q26668031
15 and 16, Drury Lane	II	15 and 16, Drury Lane			SK9747971755; 53°14′02″N 0°32′28″W		1388508	Upload Photo	Q26668034
Castle Moat House	II	18, Drury Lane			SK9741271766; 53°14′02″N 0°32′31″W		1388509	Upload Photo	
Base of Roman Wall Turret	I	East Bight			SK9773072120; 53°14′14″N 0°32′14″W		1388512	Upload Photo	Q17526569
Roman Wall between Eastgate and North Wing of Eastgate Hotel	I	East Bight			SK9785372000; 53°14′10″N 0°32′07″W		1388513	Upload Photo	Q17526574
Section of Roman Wall	I	East Bight			SK9775172121; 53°14′14″N 0°32′13″W		1388514	Upload Photo	Q17526577
Ice House 20 Metres North East of Number 13 (the Bishop's House)	II	Eastgate			SK9782271984; 53°14′09″N 0°32′09″W		1388521	Upload Photo	Q26668042
Boundary Stone Attached to the South Front of Number 17	II	Eastgate			SK9793271926; 53°14′07″N 0°32′03″W		1388523	Upload Photo	
Boundary Stone Attached to Wall Opposite Number 17	II	Eastgate			SK9792971914; 53°14′07″N 0°32′03″W		1388524	Upload Photo	
Church of St Peter in Eastgate and Attached Boundary Wall	II	Eastgate			SK9797871954; 53°14′08″N 0°32′01″W		1388534	Upload Photo	Q7591466
North Wall of Former Deanery	II	Eastgate			SK9778271905; 53°14′07″N 0°32′11″W		1388537	Upload Photo	Q26668055
Remains of North Tower of Roman East Gate	I	Eastgate			SK9784171933; 53°14′08″N 0°32′08″W		1388538	Remains of North Tower of Roman East Gate More images	Q17526599
6, Eastgate	II	6, Eastgate			SK9770471892; 53°14′06″N 0°32′15″W		1388515	Upload Photo	
7, Eastgate	II	7, Eastgate			SK9771371898; 53°14′06″N 0°32′15″W		1388516	Upload Photo	
8, Eastgate	II	8, Eastgate			SK9774871915; 53°14′07″N 0°32′13″W		1388517	Upload Photo	
9, Eastgate	II	9, Eastgate			SK9776271914; 53°14′07″N 0°32′12″W		1388518	Upload Photo	
Atherstone Place	I	12, Eastgate			SK9778171948; 53°14′08″N 0°32′11″W		1388519	Upload Photo	
The Bishop's House	I	13, Eastgate			SK9780071953; 53°14′08″N 0°32′10″W		1388520	The Bishop's House More images	Q17526588
17, Eastgate	II	17, Eastgate			SK9793371932; 53°14′07″N 0°32′03″W		1388522	Upload Photo	
18, Eastgate	II	18, Eastgate			SK9795171932; 53°14′07″N 0°32′02″W		1388525	Upload Photo	
St Peter's Lodge	II	18.5, Eastgate			SK9796271933; 53°14′07″N 0°32′01″W		1388526	Upload Photo	
Number 19 and Attached Yard Wall	II	19, Eastgate			SK9802171936; 53°14′08″N 0°31′58″W		1388527	Upload Photo	
20, Eastgate	II	20, Eastgate			SK9804071941; 53°14′08″N 0°31′57″W		1388528	Upload Photo	
22 and 23, Eastgate	II	22 and 23, Eastgate			SK9806071932; 53°14′07″N 0°31′56″W		1388529	Upload Photo	
Former D'Isney Place Hotel And Attached Railing	II*	24 and 24a, Eastgate			SK9802571911; 53°14′07″N 0°31′58″W		1388536	Former D'Isney Place Hotel And Attached Railing More images	Q17548930
25 and 27, Eastgate	II	25 and 27, Eastgate			SK9798271911; 53°14′07″N 0°32′00″W		1388530	Upload Photo	Q26668051
Elephant Inn	II	28 and 29, Eastgate			SK9790171896; 53°14′06″N 0°32′05″W		1388531	Elephant Inn More images	
Cathedral School and Attached Former Stable	II	30, Eastgate			SK9783971902; 53°14′07″N 0°32′08″W		1388532	Cathedral School and Attached Former Stable More images	Q26668053
Atton Place	II	32, Eastgate			SK9773071885; 53°14′06″N 0°32′14″W		1388533	Upload Photo	Q26668054
Former Corn Exchange	II	1-6 Exchange Arcade, LN5 7HB			SK9756871040; 53°13′39″N 0°32′24″W		1388501	Upload Photo	Q26668027
Church of St Mary Magdalene	II	Exchequergate			SK9765971824; 53°14′04″N 0°32′18″W		1388540	Church of St Mary Magdalene More images	Q7590501
Exchequergate	I	Exchequergate			SK9767771803; 53°14′03″N 0°32′17″W		1388541	Exchequergate More images	Q17526604
Exchequergate Lodge	II	Exchequergate			SK9767871830; 53°14′04″N 0°32′17″W		1388542	Upload Photo	Q26668056
2, Exchequergate	II*	2, Exchequergate			SK9765771801; 53°14′03″N 0°32′18″W		1388539	Upload Photo	Q17548935
Church of St Swithin	II*	Free School Lane			SK9774271227; 53°13′45″N 0°32′14″W		1388543	Church of St Swithin More images	Q7591804
Public Library	II	Free School Lane			SK9773471280; 53°13′46″N 0°32′15″W		1388544	Upload Photo	Q26668057
St Swithin's Vestry and Adjoining Wall	II	Free School Lane			SK9769871240; 53°13′45″N 0°32′16″W		1388545	Upload Photo	
Summerhouse 70 Metres East of Number 4 (greestone House)	II	Greestone Place			SK9800671641; 53°13′58″N 0°31′59″W		1388550	Upload Photo	Q26668063
Former Tithe Barn to Vicar's Court	II	Greestone Place			SK9790971668; 53°13′59″N 0°32′05″W		1388551	Upload Photo	Q26668064
Greestone Steps and Arch with Adjoining Close Wall to West	I	Greestone Place			SK9793471626; 53°13′58″N 0°32′03″W		1388552	Upload Photo	Q17526611
1, Greestone Place	II	1, Greestone Place			SK9788471722; 53°14′01″N 0°32′06″W		1388546	Upload Photo	Q26668059
2, Greestone Place	II	2, Greestone Place			SK9789571696; 53°14′00″N 0°32′05″W		1388547	Upload Photo	Q26668060
Number 3 and Adjoining North Garden Wall	II	3, Greestone Place			SK9792671695; 53°14′00″N 0°32′04″W		1388548	Upload Photo	Q26668061
Greenstone House and Attached Forecourt Wall and Railing	II	4, Greestone Place			SK9794471665; 53°13′59″N 0°32′03″W		1388549	Upload Photo	Q26668062
1, Greestone Terrace	II	1, Greestone Terrace			SK9794271646; 53°13′58″N 0°32′03″W		1388553	Upload Photo	Q26668065
2, Greestone Terrace	II	2, Greestone Terrace			SK9794371646; 53°13′58″N 0°32′03″W		1388554	Upload Photo	Q26668066
Greestone Holme	II	3, Greestone Terrace			SK9796971643; 53°13′58″N 0°32′01″W		1388555	Upload Photo	Q26668067
Greetwell Cottage	II	1, Greetwell Gate			SK9806571915; 53°14′07″N 0°31′56″W		1388556	Upload Photo	Q26668068
Lincoln Prison Entrance Buildings and Walls	II	Greetwell Road			SK9914771978; 53°14′08″N 0°30′58″W		1388558	Upload Photo	Q26668070
Lincoln Prison Cell Blocks	II	Greetwell Road			SK9903371950; 53°14′07″N 0°31′04″W		1388559	Upload Photo	Q26668071
Nurses' Home at Lincolnshire County Hospital	II	Greetwell Road			SK9868171864; 53°14′05″N 0°31′23″W		1388560	Upload Photo	Q26668072
Eastgate Church of England Infants School and Teacher's House and Boundary Wall	II	Greetwell Street			SK9816871945; 53°14′08″N 0°31′50″W		1388557	Upload Photo	
7-11, Guildhall Street	II	7-11, Guildhall Street			SK9747571227; 53°13′45″N 0°32′29″W		1388561	Upload Photo	
16, Guildhall Street	II	16, Guildhall Street			SK9742071235; 53°13′45″N 0°32′31″W		1388562	Upload Photo	
Post Office	II	19 and 20, Guildhall Street			SK9745771255; 53°13′46″N 0°32′29″W		1388563	Upload Photo	Q26668075
24 and 25, Guildhall Street	II	24 and 25, Guildhall Street			SK9749971242; 53°13′45″N 0°32′27″W		1388564	Upload Photo	Q26668076
26, Guildhall Street	II	26, Guildhall Street			SK9750671240; 53°13′45″N 0°32′27″W		1388565	Upload Photo	Q26668077
Church of St Helen	II*	Hall Drive, Boultham Park			SK9646069090; 53°12′36″N 0°33′26″W		1388566	Church of St Helen More images	Q17548940
Crimean War Memorial 3 Metres North West of Church of St Helen	II	Hall Drive, Boultham Park			SK9645069096; 53°12′37″N 0°33′26″W		1388567	Upload Photo	Q26668078
Church of St Botolph	II	High Street			SK9723269817; 53°12′59″N 0°32′43″W		1388596	Upload Photo	
Church of St Mary Le Wigford	I	High Street			SK9749570949; 53°13′36″N 0°32′28″W		1388597	Upload Photo	
Conduit 20 Metres South West of Church of St Mary Le Wigford	II*	High Street			SK9746770952; 53°13′36″N 0°32′29″W		1388598	Conduit 20 Metres South West of Church of St Mary Le Wigford More images	
Church of St Peter at Gowts	I	High Street			SK9732070401; 53°13′18″N 0°32′38″W		1388599	Upload Photo	Q7591464
Gowts Bridge	II	High Street			SK9725670218; 53°13′12″N 0°32′41″W		1388601	Upload Photo	Q26668107
Romanesque Door Arch in the Former Lincoln Arms Public House	II*	High Street			SK9728670446; 53°13′20″N 0°32′40″W		1388602	Upload Photo	Q17548957
St Dunstan's Lock	II	High Street			SK9759071510; 53°13′54″N 0°32′22″W		1388603	St Dunstan's Lock More images	
St Mary's Guildhall	I	High Street			SK9731270454; 53°13′20″N 0°32′38″W		1388604	St Mary's Guildhall More images	Q17526634
Stonebow and Guildhall	I	High Street			SK9752671237; 53°13′45″N 0°32′26″W		1388605	Stonebow and Guildhall More images	
Signal Box	II	High Street			SK9746770942; 53°13′36″N 0°32′29″W		1392292	Upload Photo	
53 and 54, High Street	II	53 and 54, High Street			SK9721369999; 53°13′05″N 0°32′44″W		1388568	Upload Photo	Q26668079
107-113, High Street	II	107-113, High Street			SK9727670428; 53°13′19″N 0°32′40″W		1388569	Upload Photo	Q26668080
Central Methodist Church	II	123, High Street, LN5 7PR			SK9729070545; 53°13′23″N 0°32′39″W		1388595	Upload Photo	Q26668104
190 and 191, High Street	II	190 and 191, High Street			SK9746271023; 53°13′38″N 0°32′29″W		1388570	Upload Photo	Q26668081
192, High Street	II	192, High Street			SK9746671031; 53°13′39″N 0°32′29″W		1388571	Upload Photo	Q26668082
195, High Street	II	195, High Street			SK9746971050; 53°13′39″N 0°32′29″W		1388572	Upload Photo	
Lloyd's Bank	II	202, High Street			SK9748671092; 53°13′41″N 0°32′28″W		1388573	Upload Photo	
High Bridge	I	207, 209 and 210, High Street			SK9750571160; 53°13′43″N 0°32′27″W		1388574	High Bridge More images	
214 and 215, High Street	II	214 and 215, High Street			SK9750671181; 53°13′43″N 0°32′27″W		1388575	Upload Photo	Q26668085
Midland Bank	II	220 and 221, High Street			SK9751071220; 53°13′45″N 0°32′27″W		1388576	Upload Photo	
National Westminster Bank	II	225, High Street			SK9750271261; 53°13′46″N 0°32′27″W		1388577	Upload Photo	
252 and 253, High Street	II	252 and 253, High Street			SK9755471414; 53°13′51″N 0°32′24″W		1388578	252 and 253, High Street More images	
Garmston House	II	262 and 262a, High Street			SK9757271472; 53°13′53″N 0°32′23″W		1388579	Garmston House More images	
264 and 265, High Street	II	264 and 265, High Street			SK9757571491; 53°13′53″N 0°32′23″W		1388580	264 and 265, High Street More images	Q26668090
266 and 267, High Street	II	266 and 267, High Street			SK9759271491; 53°13′53″N 0°32′22″W		1388581	Upload Photo	1. REF!
285, High Street	II	285, High Street			SK9756671360; 53°13′49″N 0°32′23″W		1388583	Upload Photo	
286 and 287, High Street	II	286 and 287, High Street			SK9757071343; 53°13′49″N 0°32′23″W		1388584	Upload Photo	
297a, 298, 299 and 300, High Street	II	297a, 298, 299 and 300, High Street			SK9753371203; 53°13′44″N 0°32′25″W		1388585	Upload Photo	Q26668094
305 and 306, High Street	II	305 and 306, High Street			SK9752471119; 53°13′41″N 0°32′26″W		1388586	Upload Photo	
310, High Street	II	310, High Street			SK9752171099; 53°13′41″N 0°32′26″W		1388587	Upload Photo	Q26668096
313, High Street	II	313, High Street			SK9752371076; 53°13′40″N 0°32′26″W		1388588	Upload Photo	Q26668097
314 and 315, High Street	II	314 and 315, High Street			SK9751571068; 53°13′40″N 0°32′27″W		1388589	Upload Photo	
319, High Street	II	319, High Street, LN5 7DW			SK9750171025; 53°13′38″N 0°32′27″W		1388590	Upload Photo	Q26668099
320, High Street	II	320, High Street, LN5 7DW			SK9749771020; 53°13′38″N 0°32′28″W		1388591	Upload Photo	
323, High Street	II	323, High Street, LN5 7DW			SK9749371007; 53°13′38″N 0°32′28″W		1388592	Upload Photo	Q26668101
333, High Street	II	333, High Street			SK9744570895; 53°13′34″N 0°32′31″W		1388593	Upload Photo	
363-364 High Street, Lincoln	II	363-364 High Street, LN5 7RL			SK9737270674; 53°13′27″N 0°32′35″W		1388594	Upload Photo	
Unitarian Chapel	II	377 High Street, LN5 7RY			SK9734070518; 53°13′22″N 0°32′37″W		1388606	Upload Photo	
Former Stable Range 70 Metres North of Deloraine Court	II	James Street			SK9774271993; 53°14′10″N 0°32′13″W		1388610	Upload Photo	
Railings and Gateway at Number 17	II	James Street			SK9775671987; 53°14′09″N 0°32′13″W		1388612	Upload Photo	
1, James Street	II	1, James Street			SK9772671904; 53°14′07″N 0°32′14″W		1388607	Upload Photo	Q26668110
2 and 3, James Street	II	2 and 3, James Street			SK9772471924; 53°14′07″N 0°32′14″W		1388608	Upload Photo	
Close Wall Adjoining Numbers 4 and 10 and 12 (numbers 10 and 12 Not Included)	II	4, James Street			SK9774472095; 53°14′13″N 0°32′13″W		1388511	Upload Photo	
Deloraine Court East and Deloraine Court West	II*	4, 5 and 6, James Street			SK9772471949; 53°14′08″N 0°32′14″W		1388609	Deloraine Court East and Deloraine Court West More images	
Burghersh Chantry	II	17, James Street			SK9776771993; 53°14′10″N 0°32′12″W		1388611	Upload Photo	
Cathedral School Boarding House	II	18, James Street			SK9776671976; 53°14′09″N 0°32′12″W		1388613	Upload Photo	
Church of St Giles	II	Lamb Gardens			SK9887572842; 53°14′36″N 0°31′11″W		1388614	Upload Photo	
Telephone Kiosks 20 Metres East of Numbers 1 and 2	II	Lindum Road			SK9781671428; 53°13′51″N 0°32′10″W		1388616	Upload Photo	
Magistrates Courts Offices	II	Lindum Road			SK9778071462; 53°13′52″N 0°32′12″W		1388618	Upload Photo	
Lincolnshire College of Art and Design	II	Lindum Road			SK9791371607; 53°13′57″N 0°32′04″W		1388627	Upload Photo	Q26668128
Lindum Holme Lodge and Attached Gateway	II	Lindum Road			SK9806271672; 53°13′59″N 0°31′56″W		1388628	Upload Photo	Q26668129
Sessions House	II	Lindum Road			SK9785671473; 53°13′53″N 0°32′08″W		1388630	Upload Photo	Q26668131
Stairs House	II	Lindum Road			SK9794671583; 53°13′56″N 0°32′03″W		1388631	Upload Photo	
Usher Art Gallery	II*	Lindum Road			SK9778271561; 53°13′56″N 0°32′12″W		1388632	Usher Art Gallery More images	
Garden Pavilion and Attached Terrace Wall 70 Metres South East of Usher Art Gallery	II	Lindum Road			SK9784771541; 53°13′55″N 0°32′08″W		1388633	Upload Photo	Q26668133
Boundary Wall and Gatepiers at Usher Art Gallery	II	Lindum Road			SK9781671511; 53°13′54″N 0°32′10″W		1388634	Upload Photo	
1 and 2, Lindum Road	II	1 and 2, Lindum Road			SK9778371424; 53°13′51″N 0°32′12″W		1388615	Upload Photo	
Number 3 and Attached Grotto	II	3, Lindum Road			SK9778671444; 53°13′52″N 0°32′12″W		1388617	Upload Photo	
5, Lindum Road	II	5, Lindum Road			SK9779171483; 53°13′53″N 0°32′11″W		1388619	Upload Photo	
6, Lindum Road	II*	6, Lindum Road			SK9779571494; 53°13′53″N 0°32′11″W		1388620	6, Lindum Road More images	
12, 13 and 14, Lindum Road	II	12, 13 and 14, Lindum Road			SK9801171616; 53°13′57″N 0°31′59″W		1388621	Upload Photo	
15-18, Lindum Road	II	15-18, Lindum Road			SK9803271624; 53°13′57″N 0°31′58″W		1388622	Upload Photo	
19a, Lindum Road	II	19a, Lindum Road			SK9805071634; 53°13′58″N 0°31′57″W		1388623	Upload Photo	Q26668124
20, 21 and 22, Lindum Road	II	20, 21 and 22, Lindum Road			SK9804971639; 53°13′58″N 0°31′57″W		1388624	Upload Photo	Q26668125
Pottergate Lodge and Adjoining Boundary Wall and Railing and Gatepiers	II	24, Lindum Road			SK9802571664; 53°13′59″N 0°31′58″W		1388625	Upload Photo	
Adam and Eve Public House	II	25, Lindum Road			SK9806471690; 53°14′00″N 0°31′56″W		1388626	Upload Photo	
1 and 2, Lindum Terrace	II	1 and 2, Lindum Terrace			SK9819971677; 53°13′59″N 0°31′49″W		1388635	Upload Photo	
3 and 4, Lindum Terrace	II	3 and 4, Lindum Terrace			SK9821571679; 53°13′59″N 0°31′48″W		1388636	Upload Photo	
5 and 6, Lindum Terrace	II	5 and 6, Lindum Terrace			SK9824671685; 53°13′59″N 0°31′46″W		1388637	Upload Photo	
7, Lindum Terrace	II	7, Lindum Terrace			SK9828171685; 53°13′59″N 0°31′45″W		1388638	Upload Photo	
22 and 24, Melville Street	II	22 and 24, Melville Street			SK9780271031; 53°13′38″N 0°32′11″W		1388639	Upload Photo	Q26668139
40, Michaelgate	II	40, Michaelgate			SK9763171698; 53°14′00″N 0°32′20″W		1388641	Upload Photo	Q26668141
42, Michaelgate	II	42, Michaelgate			SK9763471704; 53°14′00″N 0°32′19″W		1388642	Upload Photo	Q26668142
Ellis's Mill	II*	Mill Road			SK9709272222; 53°14′17″N 0°32′48″W		1388647	Ellis's Mill More images	
2-14, Mill Road	II	2-14, Mill Road			SK9715472172; 53°14′16″N 0°32′45″W		1388643	Upload Photo	Q26668143
16, Mill Road	II	16, Mill Road			SK9714872188; 53°14′16″N 0°32′45″W		1388644	Upload Photo	Q26668144
18-40, Mill Road	II	18-40, Mill Road			SK9713872216; 53°14′17″N 0°32′46″W		1388645	Upload Photo	
42, Mill Road	II	42, Mill Road			SK9713072238; 53°14′18″N 0°32′46″W		1388646	Upload Photo	Q26668146
Statue of Alfred Lord Tennyson	II	Minster Green			SK9785971893; 53°14′06″N 0°32′07″W		1388648	Upload Photo	
Close Wall And Tower In The Garden Of Number 10 Close Wall And Tower In The Garden Of Number 2 Close Wall And Tower In The Garden Of Number 25	I	Minster Yard			SK9798871853; 53°14′05″N 0°32′00″W		1388535	Upload Photo	Q17526594
Close Wall between Number 16a Minster Yard and the Deanery	I	Minster Yard			SK9778571749; 53°14′02″N 0°32′11″W		1388665	Upload Photo	
Close Wall to South and West of the Deanery	I	Minster Yard			SK9768771754; 53°14′02″N 0°32′17″W		1388666	Upload Photo	
Boundary Wall Bordering Minster Yard to South from Number 16a to Number 17	II*	Minster Yard			SK9777271762; 53°14′02″N 0°32′12″W		1388667	Upload Photo	
Bishops Palace (remains)	I	Minster Yard			SK9778671662; 53°13′59″N 0°32′11″W		1388677	Bishops Palace (remains) More images	
Inner East Gateway to Bishops Palace	II	Minster Yard			SK9782671729; 53°14′01″N 0°32′09″W		1388678	Upload Photo	
Outer East Gateway to Bishops Palace	I	Minster Yard			SK9785471734; 53°14′01″N 0°32′08″W		1388679	Upload Photo	Q17526713
Cathedral Church of St Mary and Cloisters and Chapter House and Libraries	I	Minster Yard			SK9779671808; 53°14′04″N 0°32′11″W		1388680	Cathedral Church of St Mary and Cloisters and Chapter House and Libraries	Q390169
Edward King House and Diocesan Offices and Attached Chapel	II*	Minster Yard			SK9775271695; 53°14′00″N 0°32′13″W		1388681	Upload Photo	
Close Wall to South and West of Edward King House	I	Minster Yard			SK9773771649; 53°13′58″N 0°32′14″W		1388682	Upload Photo	Q17526715
Priory Gate	II	Minster Yard			SK9789471876; 53°14′06″N 0°32′05″W		1388683	Priory Gate More images	
Gatehouse and Gateway Tower to Vicars' Court	I	1a, Minster Yard			SK9786671728; 53°14′01″N 0°32′07″W		1388649	Gatehouse and Gateway Tower to Vicars' Court More images	Q17526644
Vicars Court	I	1, 2 and 2a, Minster Yard			SK9787371703; 53°14′00″N 0°32′07″W		1388684	Vicars Court More images	
The Priory and Attached Section of Close Wall	I	2, Minster Yard			SK9795071892; 53°14′06″N 0°32′02″W		1388650	Upload Photo	
Number 3 and Adjoining Area Wall	II*	3, Minster Yard			SK9790671862; 53°14′05″N 0°32′05″W		1388651	Number 3 and Adjoining Area Wall More images	Q17548983
Vicars Court and Priests Vicars Houses	I	3 and 3a, Minster Yard			SK9784671675; 53°13′59″N 0°32′08″W		1388685	Vicars Court and Priests Vicars Houses	Q17526724
4, 5 and 5a, Minster Yard	II	4, 5 and 5a, Minster Yard			SK9791371849; 53°14′05″N 0°32′04″W		1388652	4, 5 and 5a, Minster Yard More images	Q26668148
Vicars Court and Attached Wall to South	I	4 and 4a, Minster Yard			SK9783471716; 53°14′01″N 0°32′09″W		1388686	Upload Photo	
Number 6 and Attached Wall	II	6, Minster Yard			SK9792271836; 53°14′04″N 0°32′04″W		1388653	Number 6 and Attached Wall More images	Q26668149
7 and 8, Minster Yard	II*	7 and 8, Minster Yard			SK9792771827; 53°14′04″N 0°32′03″W		1388654	7 and 8, Minster Yard More images	
9, Minster Yard	II	9, Minster Yard			SK9794171814; 53°14′04″N 0°32′03″W		1388655	9, Minster Yard More images	Q26668150
Choristers' House	II	10, 10a and 10b, Minster Yard			SK9795071802; 53°14′03″N 0°32′02″W		1388656	Choristers' House More images	Q26668151
The Chancery	I	11, Minster Yard			SK9796071795; 53°14′03″N 0°32′02″W		1380559	The Chancery More images	Q17526547
Graveley Place and Adjoining Garden Wall	II*	12, Minster Yard			SK9796771777; 53°14′02″N 0°32′01″W		1388657	Graveley Place and Adjoining Garden Wall More images	Q17548993
13, Minster Yard	II*	13, Minster Yard			SK9794571747; 53°14′01″N 0°32′03″W		1388658	13, Minster Yard More images	
13a, Minster Yard	II	13a, Minster Yard			SK9795371746; 53°14′01″N 0°32′02″W		1388659	13a, Minster Yard More images	
14, Minster Yard	II	14, Minster Yard			SK9792971745; 53°14′01″N 0°32′03″W		1388660	14, Minster Yard More images	1. REF!
Cantilupe Chantry South	I	16, Minster Yard			SK9784371738; 53°14′01″N 0°32′08″W		1388662	Cantilupe Chantry South More images	
Cantilupe Chantry North	II*	16a, Minster Yard			SK9783871749; 53°14′02″N 0°32′08″W		1388663	Cantilupe Chantry North More images	
The Deanery and Paley Flats and Adjoining Outbuildings and Stables	I	17, Minster Yard			SK9770571765; 53°14′02″N 0°32′16″W		1388664	The Deanery and Paley Flats and Adjoining Outbuildings and Stables More images	
The Subdeanery and East Midlands Tourist Board Offices	II*	18 and 18a, Minster Yard			SK9767871782; 53°14′03″N 0°32′17″W		1388668	The Subdeanery and East Midlands Tourist Board Offices More images	
19, Minster Yard	II	19, Minster Yard			SK9768571820; 53°14′04″N 0°32′17″W		1388669	19, Minster Yard More images	
20, Minster Yard	II*	20, Minster Yard			SK9769271831; 53°14′04″N 0°32′16″W		1388670	20, Minster Yard More images	
21, Minster Yard	II*	21, Minster Yard			SK9770071840; 53°14′05″N 0°32′16″W		1388671	21, Minster Yard More images	
22, Minster Yard	II*	22, Minster Yard			SK9770671847; 53°14′05″N 0°32′15″W		1388672	22, Minster Yard More images	Q17549039
23, Minster Yard	II*	23, Minster Yard			SK9771371854; 53°14′05″N 0°32′15″W		1388673	23, Minster Yard More images	
24 and 24a, Minster Yard	II	24 and 24a, Minster Yard			SK9771371880; 53°14′06″N 0°32′15″W		1388674	Upload Photo	Q26668155
25, Minster Yard	II	25, Minster Yard			SK9772571874; 53°14′06″N 0°32′14″W		1388675	Upload Photo	Q26668156
27, Minster Yard	II	27, Minster Yard			SK9773771875; 53°14′06″N 0°32′14″W		1388676	Upload Photo	
Former Baptist Sunday School and Attached Boundary Wall	II	Mint Street			SK9743371275; 53°13′47″N 0°32′31″W		1388687	Upload Photo	Q26668160
Bandstand in Arboretum	II	Monks Road			SK9843271472; 53°13′52″N 0°31′37″W		1388688	Upload Photo	Q26668161
K6 Telephone Kiosk at Entrance to Arboretum	II	Monks Road			SK9831871422; 53°13′51″N 0°31′43″W		1388689	Upload Photo	
Shelter in Arboretum	II	Monks Road			SK9838871522; 53°13′54″N 0°31′39″W		1388690	Upload Photo	
Statue of Lion in Arboretum	II	Monks Road			SK9847271511; 53°13′53″N 0°31′34″W		1388691	Upload Photo	
Church of All Saints and Attached Sunday School and Railing	II	Monks Road			SK9852071406; 53°13′50″N 0°31′32″W		1388692	Upload Photo	Q4729330
Church of St Hugh and Attached Vestry	II	Monks Road			SK9784071388; 53°13′50″N 0°32′09″W		1388693	Upload Photo	Q22087162
Gibney Building at Lincolnshire College of Art and Design	II	Monks Road			SK9789971443; 53°13′52″N 0°32′05″W		1388694	Upload Photo	
Masonry Fragments 25 Metres East of Chancel at Monks Abbey	II	Monks Road			SK9893271343; 53°13′48″N 0°31′10″W		1388695	Upload Photo	
Ruins of Chancel at Monks Abbey	II	Monks Road			SK9890571341; 53°13′48″N 0°31′11″W		1388696	Upload Photo	Q26668168
Ruins of Nave at Monks Abbey	II	Monks Road			SK9887471342; 53°13′48″N 0°31′13″W		1388697	Upload Photo	Q26668169
The Cafe and Lodge the Arboretum	II	Monks Road			SK9833071440; 53°13′51″N 0°31′42″W		1388698	Upload Photo	Q26668170
Police station and Gaol and Adjoining House	II	2, Monks Road			SK9786771456; 53°13′52″N 0°32′07″W		1388629	Upload Photo	
Queen in the West Public House	II	Moor Street			SK9663571669; 53°14′00″N 0°33′13″W		1388699	Upload Photo	
Colonia Wall 3 Metres West of Number 2 Beaumont Fee (number 2 Not Included)	II	Motherby Hill			SK9736171638; 53°13′58″N 0°32′34″W		1388700	Upload Photo	
West Hill House	II	Motherby Hill			SK9734371737; 53°14′02″N 0°32′35″W		1388701	Upload Photo	
Bromhead Hospital	II	Nettleham Road			SK9798872214; 53°14′17″N 0°32′00″W		1388708	Upload Photo	Q26668180
Northgate House and Attached Railings	II	1, Nettleham Road			SK9794272047; 53°14′11″N 0°32′02″W		1388702	Upload Photo	Q26668174
Orchard House	II	21, Nettleham Road			SK9801172328; 53°14′20″N 0°31′58″W		1388703	Upload Photo	
66, Nettleham Road	II	66, Nettleham Road			SK9825272565; 53°14′28″N 0°31′45″W		1388704	Upload Photo	
96-102, Nettleham Road	II	96-102, Nettleham Road			SK9832972693; 53°14′32″N 0°31′41″W		1388706	Upload Photo	Q26668178
104-110, Nettleham Road	II	104-110, Nettleham Road			SK9833972708; 53°14′32″N 0°31′40″W		1388707	Upload Photo	Q26668179
Grosvenor Hall Private Nursing Home	II	Newark Road			SK9679468236; 53°12′09″N 0°33′08″W		1388710	Upload Photo	
210, Newark Road	II	210, Newark Road			SK9670868167; 53°12′06″N 0°33′13″W		1388709	Upload Photo	Q26668181
House Front Incorporated in Lincolnshire County Council Offices	II	Newland			SK9717571481; 53°13′53″N 0°32′44″W		1388719	Upload Photo	
New Life Christian Fellowship	II*	Newland			SK9734671288; 53°13′47″N 0°32′35″W		1388720	Upload Photo	
Newland Chambers	II	Newland			SK9736871284; 53°13′47″N 0°32′34″W		1388721	Upload Photo	
1, Newland	II	1, Newland			SK9741071266; 53°13′46″N 0°32′32″W		1388711	Upload Photo	
22 and 22a, Newland	II	22 and 22a, Newland			SK9734271250; 53°13′46″N 0°32′36″W		1388712	Upload Photo	Q26668184
24, Newland	II	24, Newland			SK9733371255; 53°13′46″N 0°32′36″W		1388713	Upload Photo	Q26668185
26 and 28, Newland	II	26 and 28, Newland			SK9731571257; 53°13′46″N 0°32′37″W		1388714	26 and 28, Newland More images	
30, Newland	II	30, Newland			SK9730271261; 53°13′46″N 0°32′38″W		1388715	30, Newland More images	Q26668187
Grafton House	II	32, Newland			SK9727671276; 53°13′47″N 0°32′39″W		1388716	Upload Photo	
64, Newland	II	64, Newland			SK9721271338; 53°13′49″N 0°32′43″W		1388717	Upload Photo	Q26668189
Numbers 78-88 and Attached Railings	II	Newland			SK9714971374; 53°13′50″N 0°32′46″W		1388718	Numbers 78-88 and Attached Railings More images	Q26668190
Boundary Stone 15 Metres North of the Newport Arch	II	Newport			SK9766772137; 53°14′14″N 0°32′17″W		1388725	Upload Photo	Q26668196
Boundary Stone 25 Metres North of the Newport Arch	II	Newport			SK9765772141; 53°14′14″N 0°32′18″W		1388726	Upload Photo	
Church of St Nicholas	II	Newport			SK9768972452; 53°14′24″N 0°32′16″W		1388727	Upload Photo	
Willsons Cottages at Newport Cemetery	II	Newport			SK9768572534; 53°14′27″N 0°32′16″W		1388728	Upload Photo	Q26668199
23, Newport	II	23, Newport			SK9759072301; 53°14′20″N 0°32′21″W		1388722	Upload Photo	Q26668193
Newport Manor	II	58, Newport			SK9768472428; 53°14′24″N 0°32′16″W		1388723	Upload Photo	
St Nicholas House	II	70, Newport			SK9769872570; 53°14′28″N 0°32′15″W		1388724	Upload Photo	Q26668195
Brush Factory and Attached Warehouse	II	North Witham Bank			SK9745771174; 53°13′43″N 0°32′30″W		1388729	Upload Photo	Q26668200
Northgate Cottage	II	6, Northgate			SK9792872137; 53°14′14″N 0°32′03″W		1388730	Upload Photo	Q26668201
Colonia Wall and Lower West Gate	I	Orchard Street			SK9733271449; 53°13′52″N 0°32′36″W		1388731	Colonia Wall and Lower West Gate More images	Q17526733
Friends Meeting House	II	Park Street			SK9737471330; 53°13′48″N 0°32′34″W		1388732	Upload Photo	Q26668202
Gazebo 20 Metres South of Number 2	II	Pottergate			SK9803671709; 53°14′00″N 0°31′58″W		1388734	Upload Photo	Q26668204
Pottergate Arch	I	Pottergate			SK9802271693; 53°14′00″N 0°31′59″W		1388738	Pottergate Arch More images	Q17526744
2, Pottergate	II	2, Pottergate			SK9801171717; 53°14′00″N 0°31′59″W		1388733	Upload Photo	Q26668203
3 and 3a, Pottergate	II*	3 and 3a, Pottergate			SK9800071732; 53°14′01″N 0°32′00″W		1388735	3 and 3a, Pottergate More images	Q17549061
4, Pottergate	II*	4, Pottergate			SK9799471741; 53°14′01″N 0°32′00″W		1388736	4, Pottergate More images	Q17549067
St Marys School	I	5, Pottergate			SK9798371758; 53°14′02″N 0°32′01″W		1388737	St Marys School More images	Q17526739
Crown Mill	II	Princess Street			SK9704770336; 53°13′16″N 0°32′53″W		1388739	Upload Photo	Q26668205
The Rest	II	4, Priorygate			SK9790271908; 53°14′07″N 0°32′05″W		1388740	The Rest More images	Q26668206
24, Rasen Lane	II	24, Rasen Lane			SK9753172269; 53°14′19″N 0°32′24″W		1388741	Upload Photo	Q26668207
Dial Cottage	II	88, Riseholme Road			SK9759773528; 53°14′59″N 0°32′19″W		1388742	Upload Photo	Q26668208
Fosse House	II	Roman Wharf			SK9646971565; 53°13′57″N 0°33′22″W		1388743	Upload Photo	
Wesleyan Day School	II	27, Rosemary Lane			SK9795371302; 53°13′47″N 0°32′03″W		1388744	Upload Photo	Q26668210
Mayors Parlour	II	Saltergate			SK9754871235; 53°13′45″N 0°32′25″W		1388753	Upload Photo	Q26668218
Racecourse Grandstand	II	Saxilby Road			SK9591471842; 53°14′06″N 0°33′52″W		1388754	Upload Photo	Q26668219
Saxon Villa and Attached Railings	II	32, Saxon Street			SK9748272336; 53°14′21″N 0°32′27″W		1388755	Upload Photo	Q26668220
Chapel at St Annes Bedehouses	II	Sewell Road			SK9849071765; 53°14′02″N 0°31′33″W		1388758	Upload Photo	
St Annes Bedehouses	II	Sewell Road			SK9844171768; 53°14′02″N 0°31′36″W		1388759	Upload Photo	Q26668224
Eastern Boundary Wall at St Annes Bedehouses	II	Sewell Road			SK9850871766; 53°14′02″N 0°31′32″W		1388760	Upload Photo	Q26668225
Well House at North End of St Annes Bedehouses	II	Sewell Road			SK9846871762; 53°14′02″N 0°31′34″W		1388761	Upload Photo	Q26668226
Lindum House and Attached Garden Wall and Boundary Wall	II	11, Sewell Road			SK9838871772; 53°14′02″N 0°31′39″W		1388756	Upload Photo	Q26668221
Numbers 27 and 29 and Attached Boundary Wall	II	27 and 29, Sewell Road			SK9844871736; 53°14′01″N 0°31′36″W		1388757	Upload Photo	Q26668222
2 and 3, Silver Street	II	2 and 3, Silver Street			SK9755371257; 53°13′46″N 0°32′24″W		1388762	2 and 3, Silver Street More images	Q26668227
Lincoln Constitutional Club	II	18, Silver Street			SK9778571364; 53°13′49″N 0°32′12″W		1388763	Upload Photo	Q26668228
21, 22 and 23, Silver Street	II	21, 22 and 23, Silver Street			SK9777371394; 53°13′50″N 0°32′12″W		1388764	Upload Photo	Q26668229
24, Silver Street	II	24, Silver Street			SK9776671390; 53°13′50″N 0°32′13″W		1388765	Upload Photo	Q26668230
42, Silver Street	II	42, Silver Street			SK9763171310; 53°13′48″N 0°32′20″W		1388766	Upload Photo	Q26668231
Central Market	II	Sincil Street, LN5 7ET			SK9761371096; 53°13′41″N 0°32′21″W		1388825	Upload Photo	
Stones Place	II	Skellingthorpe Road			SK9415770231; 53°13′15″N 0°35′28″W		1388767	Upload Photo	Q26668232
Stamp End Bridge	II	Spa Road			SK9846271027; 53°13′38″N 0°31′36″W		1388768	Upload Photo	Q26668233
St Annes Cottage	II	6, St Annes Close			SK9852071784; 53°14′02″N 0°31′32″W		1388745	Upload Photo	Q26668211
Church of St Benedict	II*	St Benedicts Square			SK9748071117; 53°13′41″N 0°32′28″W		1388746	Church of St Benedict More images	Q17549072
War Memorial 5 Metres East of Church of St Benedict	II	St Benedicts Square			SK9749271114; 53°13′41″N 0°32′28″W		1388747	Upload Photo	Q26668212
St Catherines Methodist Church and Adjoining Church Hall	II	St Catherines			SK9712969559; 53°12′51″N 0°32′49″W		1388748	Upload Photo	Q26668213
Well Approximately 5 Metres East of Number 2 (the Well House)	II	St Leonards Lane			SK9821971956; 53°14′08″N 0°31′48″W		1388750	Upload Photo	Q26668215
The Well House	II	2, St Leonards Lane			SK9820471959; 53°14′08″N 0°31′48″W		1388749	Upload Photo	Q26668214
St Mark's Church Hall	II	St Mark's Street, LN7 7BA			SK9735870861; 53°13′33″N 0°32′35″W		1388751	Upload Photo	Q26668216
Lincoln Central Station and Footbridge and Platform Building and Yard Walls	II	St Marys Street			SK9757170879; 53°13′34″N 0°32′24″W		1388752	Upload Photo	Q3427836
Barbican Hotel	II	11, St Mary's Street, LN5 7EQ			SK9757070974; 53°13′37″N 0°32′24″W		1475731	Upload Photo	
Former St Mark’s Railway Station and adjoining Office and Platform	II	1-6 Station Street, LN5 7EY			SK9733870751; 53°13′30″N 0°32′36″W		1388600	Upload Photo	Q6551021: 1. REF!
Boundary Stone 1 Metre to Right of Door of Number 45	II	Steep Hill			SK9763271744; 53°14′02″N 0°32′19″W		1388794	Upload Photo	Q26668258
Jew's House	I	1, Steep Hill			SK9763371566; 53°13′56″N 0°32′20″W		1388810	Jew's House More images	
Jews Court	I	2 and 3, Steep Hill			SK9763771576; 53°13′56″N 0°32′19″W		1388769	Jews Court More images	Q3178465
9, Steep Hill	II	9, Steep Hill			SK9764671614; 53°13′57″N 0°32′19″W		1388770	9, Steep Hill More images	Q26668234
10, Steep Hill	II	10, Steep Hill			SK9764571624; 53°13′58″N 0°32′19″W		1388771	10, Steep Hill More images	Q26668235
Chestnut House	II	11a, Steep Hill			SK9764471652; 53°13′59″N 0°32′19″W		1388772	Chestnut House More images	Q26668236
12 and 13, Steep Hill	II	12 and 13, Steep Hill			SK9764571659; 53°13′59″N 0°32′19″W		1388773	12 and 13, Steep Hill More images	Q26668237
14, Steep Hill	II	14, Steep Hill			SK9764671668; 53°13′59″N 0°32′19″W		1388774	14, Steep Hill More images	Q26668238
15 and 16, Steep Hill	II	15 and 16, Steep Hill			SK9764771675; 53°13′59″N 0°32′19″W		1388775	15 and 16, Steep Hill More images	Q26668239
17 and 18, Steep Hill	II	17 and 18, Steep Hill			SK9764671683; 53°14′00″N 0°32′19″W		1388776	17 and 18, Steep Hill More images	Q26668240
19, Steep Hill	II	19, Steep Hill, LN2 1LT			SK9764271693; 53°14′00″N 0°32′19″W		1388777	19, Steep Hill More images	Q26668241: 1. REF!
24, Steep Hill	II	24, Steep Hill			SK9762271745; 53°14′02″N 0°32′20″W		1388779	24, Steep Hill More images	
25, Steep Hill	II	25, Steep Hill			SK9762271750; 53°14′02″N 0°32′20″W		1388781	25, Steep Hill More images	
26 and 27, Steep Hill	II	26 and 27, Steep Hill			SK9762271758; 53°14′02″N 0°32′20″W		1388782	26 and 27, Steep Hill More images	
Wig and Mitre Public House (number 29)	II	28, 29 and 30, Steep Hill			SK9762071767; 53°14′02″N 0°32′20″W		1388783	Wig and Mitre Public House (number 29) More images	Q26668247
32, Steep Hill	II	32, Steep Hill			SK9762471780; 53°14′03″N 0°32′20″W		1388784	32, Steep Hill More images	Q26668248
33, Steep Hill	II	33, Steep Hill			SK9762471786; 53°14′03″N 0°32′20″W		1388785	33, Steep Hill More images	Q26668249
34, Steep Hill	II	34, Steep Hill			SK9762571790; 53°14′03″N 0°32′20″W		1388786	Upload Photo	Q26668250
36, Steep Hill	II	36, Steep Hill			SK9764071791; 53°14′03″N 0°32′19″W		1388787	36, Steep Hill More images	
37, Steep Hill	II	37, Steep Hill			SK9763871786; 53°14′03″N 0°32′19″W		1388788	Upload Photo	
The Spinning Wheel	II	39, Steep Hill			SK9763771780; 53°14′03″N 0°32′19″W		1388789	The Spinning Wheel More images	
40, Steep Hill	II	40, Steep Hill			SK9763771775; 53°14′03″N 0°32′19″W		1388790	40, Steep Hill More images	Q26668254
41 and 42, Steep Hill	II	41 and 42, Steep Hill			SK9763571768; 53°14′02″N 0°32′19″W		1388791	41 and 42, Steep Hill More images	Q26668255
43 and 44, Steep Hill	II	43 and 44, Steep Hill			SK9763471756; 53°14′02″N 0°32′19″W		1388792	43 and 44, Steep Hill More images	Q26668256
45, Steep Hill	II	45, Steep Hill			SK9763771747; 53°14′02″N 0°32′19″W		1388793	45, Steep Hill More images	Q26668257
46 and 47 Steep Hill, 1, Christ Hospital Terrace	I	46 and 47 Steep Hill, 1, Christ Hospital Terrace			SK9764371732; 53°14′01″N 0°32′19″W		1388795	46 and 47 Steep Hill, 1, Christ Hospital Terrace More images	Q3343784
Number 48 and Attached Boundary Wall	II	48, Steep Hill			SK9765671699; 53°14′00″N 0°32′18″W		1388796	Number 48 and Attached Boundary Wall More images	Q26668259
49 and 50, Steep Hill	II	49 and 50, Steep Hill			SK9765671689; 53°14′00″N 0°32′18″W		1388797	49 and 50, Steep Hill More images	Q26668260
Harding House	II	51, Steep Hill			SK9765871677; 53°13′59″N 0°32′18″W		1388798	Harding House More images	Q26668261
52 and 53, Steep Hill	II	52 and 53, Steep Hill			SK9765971672; 53°13′59″N 0°32′18″W		1388799	52 and 53, Steep Hill More images	Q26668262
Church of St John	II*	Sudbrooke Drive, Ermine			SK9808973285; 53°14′51″N 0°31′53″W		1388800	Church of St John More images	
Garden Temple 75 Metres West of Lincolnshire College of Art and Design	II	Temple Gardens			SK9783471632; 53°13′58″N 0°32′09″W		1388801	Upload Photo	
Ruined Building and Adjoining Section of Close Wall to North	I	Temple Gardens			SK9781471641; 53°13′58″N 0°32′10″W		1388802	Ruined Building and Adjoining Section of Close Wall to North	
2, 3 and 4, The Strait	II	2, 3 and 4, The Strait			SK9760071517; 53°13′54″N 0°32′21″W		1388803	2, 3 and 4, The Strait More images	
5, The Strait	II	5, The Strait			SK9760671526; 53°13′55″N 0°32′21″W		1388804	5, The Strait More images	Q26668265
7, The Strait	II	7, The Strait			SK9761171534; 53°13′55″N 0°32′21″W		1388805	7, The Strait More images	Q26668266
8 and 9, The Strait	II	8 and 9, The Strait			SK9761771540; 53°13′55″N 0°32′21″W		1388806	8 and 9, The Strait More images	
10 and 11, The Strait	II	10 and 11, The Strait			SK9762071548; 53°13′55″N 0°32′20″W		1388807	10 and 11, The Strait More images	
12 and 13, The Strait	II	12 and 13, The Strait			SK9762471553; 53°13′55″N 0°32′20″W		1388808	12 and 13, The Strait More images	
14, The Strait	II	14, The Strait			SK9762971557; 53°13′56″N 0°32′20″W		1388809	14, The Strait More images	
25 and 26, The Strait	II	25 and 26, The Strait			SK9762271526; 53°13′55″N 0°32′20″W		1388811	25 and 26, The Strait More images	
27 and 28, The Strait	II	27 and 28, The Strait			SK9761571518; 53°13′54″N 0°32′21″W		1388812	27 and 28, The Strait More images	Q26668272
29, The Strait	II	29, The Strait			SK9761271512; 53°13′54″N 0°32′21″W		1388813	29, The Strait More images	Q26668273
Dernstall House	II*	33 and 34, The Strait			SK9759771499; 53°13′54″N 0°32′22″W		1388814	Dernstall House More images	
Charlesworth Monument	II	Union Road			SK9732771784; 53°14′03″N 0°32′36″W		1388815	Upload Photo	
Wall and Railings Enclosing Charlesworth Monument	II	Union Road			SK9733671781; 53°14′03″N 0°32′35″W		1388816	Upload Photo	
Hilton House and Attached Wall and Gatepiers	II	Union Road			SK9735771790; 53°14′03″N 0°32′34″W		1388817	Upload Photo	
Hilton Lodge and Attached Walls	II	Union Road			SK9735271825; 53°14′04″N 0°32′34″W		1388818	Upload Photo	
The Lawn	II*	Union Road			SK9728371873; 53°14′06″N 0°32′38″W		1388819	The Lawn More images	
Former Headmasters House and Dormitory Block at St Josephs School	II	Upper Lindum Street			SK9816671728; 53°14′01″N 0°31′51″W		1388820	Upload Photo	
Elm House	II	1, Upper Long Leys Road			SK9715972154; 53°14′15″N 0°32′45″W		1388821	Upload Photo	
The Olde House	II	1, Vere Street			SK9760172537; 53°14′27″N 0°32′20″W		1388822	Upload Photo	Q26668280
The Witch and the Wardrobe Public House and Attached Outbuildings	II	21, Waterside North			SK9770071152; 53°13′42″N 0°32′16″W		1388823	Upload Photo	
Green Dragon Public House	II	28, 29 and 30, Waterside North			SK9776071150; 53°13′42″N 0°32′13″W		1388824	Upload Photo	
Doughtys Oil Mill and Attached Gatehouse and Grain Store	II	Waterside South			SK9784971100; 53°13′41″N 0°32′08″W		1388826	Upload Photo	
Water Pump at North West Junction with Steep Hill	II	Well Lane			SK9765871613; 53°13′57″N 0°32′18″W		1388828	Upload Photo	
Danes Cottages	II	4-7, Well Lane			SK9770971623; 53°13′58″N 0°32′15″W		1388827	Danes Cottages More images	Q26668285
Mint Wall	I	West Bight			SK9758972004; 53°14′10″N 0°32′22″W		1388829	Mint Wall More images	
Stable Block in Grounds of Number 5 Pottergate in St Marys School	II	Winnowsty Lane			SK9808671824; 53°14′04″N 0°31′55″W		1388830	Upload Photo	
Tower and Sections of Close Wall Bordering Grounds of Number 5 Pottergate	I	Winnowsty Lane			SK9807571830; 53°14′04″N 0°31′56″W		1388831	Upload Photo	
Harvest Moon Public House	II	Wolsey Way			SK9986273188; 53°14′47″N 0°30′18″W		1388832	Upload Photo	
1, Wordsworth Street	II	1, Wordsworth Street			SK9761571747; 53°14′02″N 0°32′20″W		1388833	Upload Photo	Q26668289
Lincoln Christ Hospital School and Attached Headmasters House	II	Wragby Road			SK9869772376; 53°14′21″N 0°31′21″W		1388836	Upload Photo	Q26668292
St Marys Nursery School and Attached Wall and Railings	II	1, Wragby Road			SK9813271813; 53°14′03″N 0°31′52″W		1388834	Upload Photo	Q26668290
15 and 17, Wragby Road	II	15 and 17, Wragby Road			SK9820271856; 53°14′05″N 0°31′49″W		1388835	Upload Photo	

== See also ==
- Grade I listed buildings in Lincolnshire
- Grade II* listed buildings in Lincolnshire

== Sources ==
- Pevsner, Nikolaus; Harris, John; Antram, Nicholas (1989) [1954], Lincolnshire, The Buildings of England, New Haven and London: Yale University Press, ISBN 978-0-300-09620-0
