= Alive Church, Lincoln =

Alive Church
- Alive Church, Lincoln
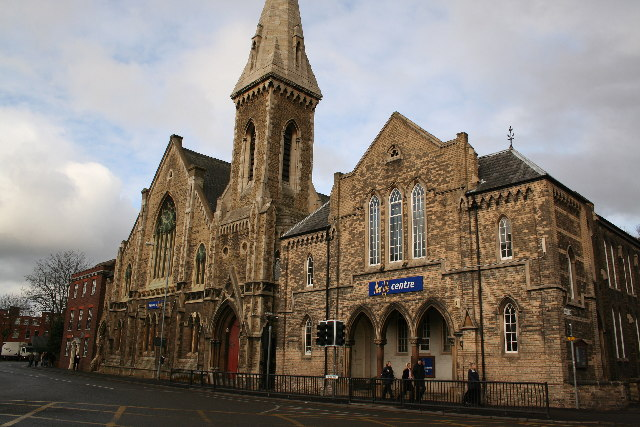
- Alive Church, Lincoln
- Alive Church
- 53.2295°N 0.54329°W
- OS grid reference: SK 97346 71288
- Location: Newland, Lincoln, Lincolnshire,
- Country: England
- Denomination: Alive Church
- Website: alivechurch.org.uk

History
- Status: Active

Architecture
- Functional status: Active
- Heritage designation: Grade II* listed
- Designated: 1973

Alive Church, Lincoln is a Grade II*-listed church in the city of Lincoln, in Lincolnshire, England. It is an active place of worship and part of the Alive Church group of churches. The building is a former Congregational church, built in 1876 with its interior refitted in 1991. When it was listed in 1973 it was known as the New Life Christian Fellowship.
