= Newland, Lincoln =

Area of Lincoln in Lincolnshire England

Coordinates: 53.229332°N 0.545657°W

Newland
- Suburb and Historic District
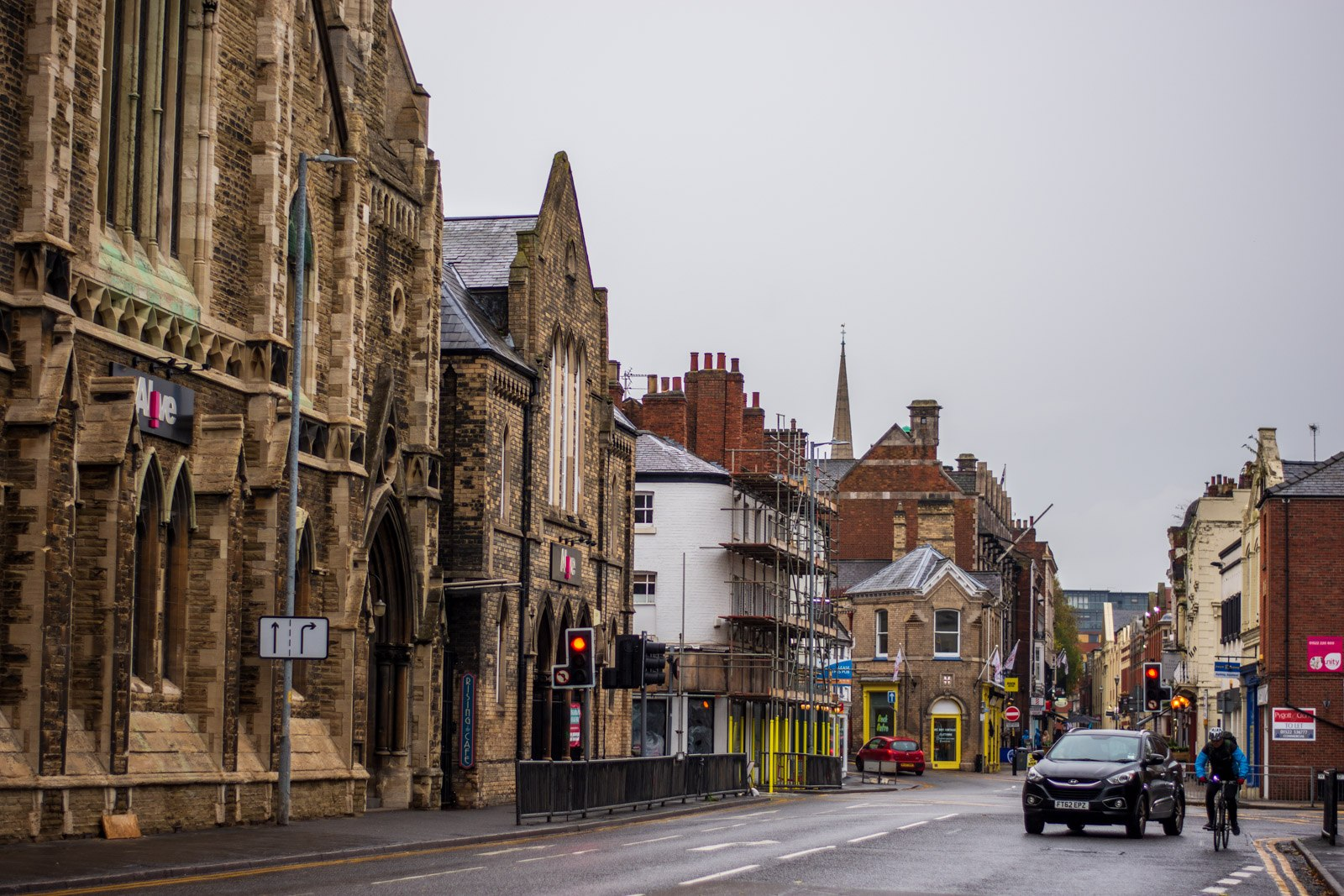
- Newland, Lincoln

- Location within Lincolnshire
- Population: 603
  - London: 157 mi (253 km) S
- Civil parish: Unparished
- District: Lincoln
- Shire county: Lincolnshire
- Region: East Midlands
- Country: England
- Sovereign state: United Kingdom
- Post town: Lincoln
- Postcode district: LN1
- Dialling code: 01522
- Police: Lincolnshire
- Fire: Lincolnshire
- Ambulance: East Midlands
- UK Parliament: Lincoln

Newland is a historic district of Lincoln in the county of Lincolnshire, England. It is located to the west of the city centre and faces Brayford Pool. The street and area around it existed in Roman times as archaeologists found some 23 human skeletons of that period on the site of the former Viking House in 2015. An additional three skeletons were found in 2018 during construction of student flats on the site. The name of the area may derive from land reclamation which took place around the Foss Dyke in the 1120s, in the reign of Henry I. One of Lincoln's many demolished medieval churches, St Stephen-in-Newland, stood on the area's main street until the mid-sixteenth century.

Newland was once home to the Lincoln Port on the River Witham. The Palace Theatre, Lincoln's main theatre until its demolition in the 1940s and its supersession by the New Theatre Royal Lincoln, was located in Newland. The area houses the headquarters of Lincolnshire County Council, which were built in the 1930s on the site of eighteenth-century Newland House, and which incorporate the original façade. In 2024 the area's main thoroughfare, Newland, and adjacent roads, underwent extensive rebuilding.
