= Leigh-Pemberton House =

Building in Lincoln, England

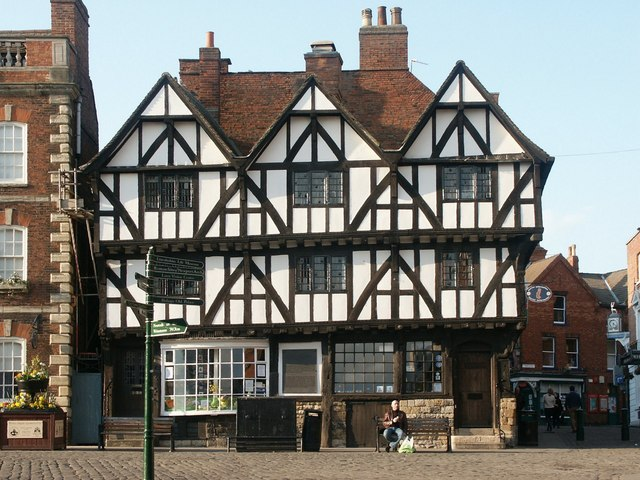

- Location within Lincolnshire

General information
- Location: Lincoln, Lincolnshire, England
- Coordinates: 53.2345°N 0.5387°W
- Completed: 1543

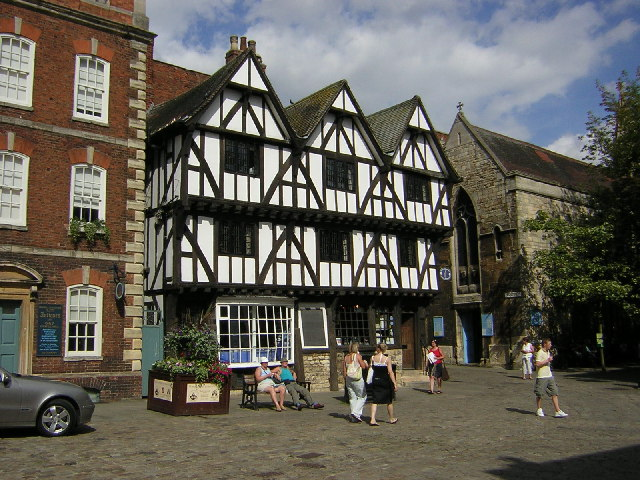

Leigh-Pemberton House is a historic house located on Castle Square in Lincoln, England, located on Bailgate between Lincoln Cathedral and Lincoln Castle. It became a Grade II* listed building on 8 October 1953. It is a half-timbered Tudor house, originally built for a merchant in 1543. A bank from 1899 until 1979, it was eventually given to the city of Lincoln by the Chairman of the National Westminster Bank, Sir Robin Leigh-Pemberton, (later governor of the Bank of England). It underwent extensive restoration in 1929 and 1970.
