= Boole family =

English family

The Boole family is an English family with number of illustrious scientists, intellectuals and artists. This is the family of George Boole, a mathematician, philosopher and logician. Boole's Boolean Algebra laid the foundation of modern computer science.

George Boole was born in 1815 to John Boole Sr., a shoemaker and Mary Ann Joyce. George Boole had 3 siblings, 2 brothers and 1 sister, namely Charles Boole, William Boole and Mary Boole.

In 1855, George Boole married Mary Everest Boole (niece of Sir George Everest).

George and Mary had 5 children, all girls, namely:

- Mary Ellen Boole Hinton: Mary, a mathematician, married a fellow mathematician and author Charles Howard Hinton (son of James Hinton, a surgeon). They had four children, namely George (1882–1943), Eric (1884-), William (1886–1909), Sebastian (1887–1923). After the sudden death of her husband, Mary Ellen committed suicide in Washington, D.C. in May 1908.
  - Sebastian Boole Hinton, a lawyer. He married Carmelita Hinton (nee Chase), an educator, and had 3 children. Carmelita Hinton was sister to Helena Modjeska Chase, an accomplished artist, writer and musician.
    - Jean Hinton Rosner (1917–2002), a peace activist. She was married to Stephen 'Steve' Rosner. They had 4 children, namely, Edward Hinton Rosner, Marni Rosner, Sarah Wendi Rosner and Peter Robin Rosner.
    - William H. Hinton (1919–2004) visited China in the 1930s and 40s and wrote an influential account of the Communist land reform. Hinton married Bertha Sneck, an American translator and political activist.
      - Carma Hinton, William's daughter, a filmmaker and professor at George Mason University.
    - Joan Hinton (1921–2010), a nuclear physicist, worked for the Manhattan Project and lived in China from 1948 until her death on 8 June 2010; she was married to Erwin (Sid) Engst (1949–2003), an advisor to the People's Republic of China. They had 3 children.
      - Yang Heping (Fred Engst) is a professor at University of International Business and Economics at Beijing.
  - George Boole Hinton, a botanist.
    - Howard Everest Hinton, George's son, an entomologist and professor.
      - Geoffrey Everest Hinton, a cognitive psychologist and computer scientist notable for his work in field of Artificial Intelligence. He is famously referred as "Godfather of AI" and "Godfather of Deep Learning". He has been awarded Turing Award, sometimes referred to as the 'Nobel Prize of Computing', in 2018. The Nobel Prize in Physics 2024 was awarded to him and John J. Hopfield “for foundational discoveries and inventions that enable machine learning with artificial neural networks.”
- Margaret Boole (1858–1935), married Edward Ingram Taylor, an artist. They had two sons.
  - Geoffrey Ingram Taylor (1886-1975), a mathematician and a Fellow of the Royal Society.
  - Julian Taylor (1889-1961), a neurosurgeon and a professor of surgery.
- Alicia Boole Stott (1860–1940), a mathematician who made important contributions to four-dimensional geometry. Alicia Boole married Walter Stott in 1890, and they had 2 children:
  - Mary Stott (1891–1982), Alicia's daughter.
  - Leonard Stott (1892–1963), a medical doctor and tuberculosis pioneer, invented a portable X-ray machine, a pneumothorax apparatus, and system of navigation based on spherical coordinates.
- Lucy Everest Boole (1862–1904), a chemist who was the first female professor of chemistry in England and female Fellow of the Royal Institute of Chemistry. Lucy was a spinster.
- Ethel Lilian Voynich (1864–1960), a novelist and musician who married the Polish scientist and revolutionary Wilfrid Michael Voynich and was the author of the novel The Gadfly.
