= Carma Hinton =

American filmmaker (born 1949)

- 韩倞
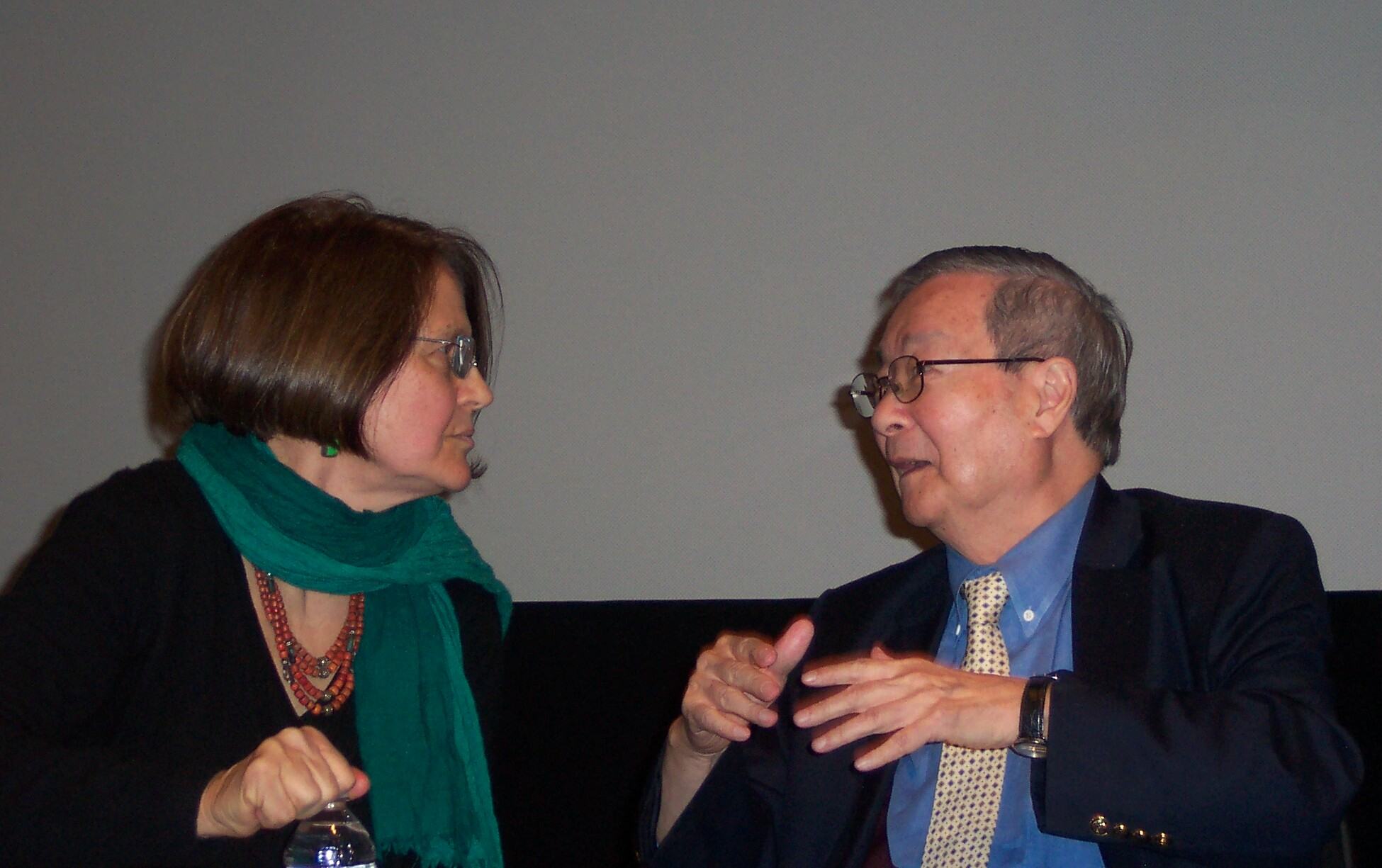
- Hinton (left) at a panel discussion on The Red Detachment of Women at Freer Gallery with Chi Wang (right)
- Born: 1949 (age 76–77); Beijing, China
- Education: Harvard University (PhD)
- Occupation: Filmmaker
- Parents: William H. Hinton (father); Bertha Sneck (mother)

Carma Hinton (Chinese: 韩倞; pinyin: Hán Jìng, born 1949) is a documentary filmmaker and Clarence J. Robinson Professor of Visual Culture and Chinese Studies at George Mason University. She worked with Richard Gordon in directing thirteen documentary films about China, including Morning Sun and The Gate of Heavenly Peace. She has also taught at Swarthmore College, Wellesley College, MIT, and Northeastern University and has lectured on Chinese culture, history, and film around the world.

== Early life ==
Hinton was born to American parents in Beijing, China. Her father was William H. Hinton, an American farmer and prolific writer. Hinton was raised speaking Chinese as her first language. She attended Beijing's prestigious 101 Middle School before leaving the country when she was twenty-one.

Hinton attended Harvard University where she earned a Ph.D. in art history.

== Career ==
=== Films ===
Hinton has received several awards for her work in film including the George Foster Peabody Award (twice), the John E. O'Connor Film Award, the Best Social and Political Documentary and the International Critics Prize (Banff Television Festival), as well as a number of nominations for "best documentary feature".

Her films have received recognition in both the popular press and in academic journals.

- Morning Sun, about China's Cultural Revolution—is "a stunning new documentary film" (Newsweek), "an astonishing mix of propaganda and news footage ... an illuminating look at China's dark time" (The Boston Globe), and "transfixing" (The New York Times).
- The Gate of Heavenly Peace, about the 1989 Tiananmen Square protests—"is a deep, powerful and rivetingly complex study of Tiananmen" (Newsweek), "enthralling" (The New York Times), and "one of the great documentaries of the past 20 years" (Boston Phoenix).
- One Village in China—"an empathetic introduction to a handful of people who live in a complexly textured world of large power constellations, intimate social relations and deep moral dilemmas" (Journal of Asian Studies).
- Long Bow Trilogy:
  - Small Happiness—" Shows the changing lives of village women, called "invaluable for both general audiences and the academic community" (Smithsonian Institution).
  - To Taste 100 Herbs: Gods, Ancestors, and Medicine depicts the work of a Chinese herbal physician and his Catholic faith.
  - All Under Heaven

Hinton's films have been shown in numerous film festivals and other venues worldwide and have been broadcast on television stations around the world.

=== Other work ===
Hinton has also produced websites for Morning Sun and The Gate of Heavenly Peace. These sites contain thousands of pages of text in Chinese and English, along with media clips, slideshows, photographs, posters, diaries, and other images. The sites receive over twenty-thousand visitors per month, and they have been incorporated into Chinese studies courses worldwide. The Gate of Heavenly Peace website has been recognized by The Washington Post, The Boston Globe, Wired, and Yahoo, among others, as one of the leading Internet resources on China. It has received an award from the Australian National University as one of the best web resources in the fields of social sciences and humanities. It is also rated as an essential educational resource by the Internet Guide for China Studies at Heidelberg University.

In 1997, Hinton assisted the Peabody Essex Museum in Salem, Massachusetts, in a unique project to bring a Qing dynasty house from China's Anhui province to the U.S. The house, known as Yin Yu Tang, has been reassembled at the Peabody, where it provides an extraordinary opportunity for visitors to learn about Chinese architecture, traditional culture, and daily life.

== Personal ==
=== Notable family members ===
- William Hinton (father), author of Fanshen: A Documentary of Revolution in a Chinese Village.
- Bertha Sneck (mother), translator for Chinese government.
- Joan Hinton (aunt), a nuclear physicist who worked on the Manhattan Project in Los Alamos, and her husband Erwin (Sid) Engst
- Carmelita Hinton (grandmother), educator and founder of the Putney School in Vermont.
- Charles Howard Hinton (great-grandfather), mathematician and science fiction writer.
- George Boole (great-great-grandfather), mathematician and philosopher, inventor of boolean algebra.
- Ethel Lilian Voynich (great-grandaunt, daughter of George Boole), novelist, musician, author of The Gadfly. Her husband, Wilfrid Michael Voynich, was an antique book-dealer and the eponym of the Voynich manuscript. Clips from a film of The Gadfly appear in Carma Hinton's 2003 documentary Morning Sun
