= Tokyo Melody: A Film about Ryuichi Sakamoto =

- French: Tokyo melody: un film sur Ryuichi Sakamoto
- Directed by: Elizabeth Lennard
- Starring: Ryuichi Sakamoto; Akiko Yano; Haruomi Hosono; Yukihiro Takahashi
- Cinematography: Jacques Pamart; Michel Bort
- Edited by: Makiko Suzuki
- Music by: Ryuichi Sakamoto
- Production companies: INA; Yoroshita Music Inc.
- Release date: 1985
- Running time: 62 minutes
- Countries: France, Japan
- Languages: Japanese, French, English

Tokyo Melody: A Film about Ryuichi Sakamoto (French: Tokyo melody: un film sur Ryuichi Sakamoto) is a 1985 French-Japanese documentary co-production of France's INA and Yoroshita Music Inc. Shot in Tokyo and directed by Elizabeth Lennard, the film uses a "hands-off" nonlinear structure in which interviews with musician Ryuichi Sakamoto, concert footage of Yellow Magic Orchestra, and scenes of Sakamoto recording his 1984 studio album Illustrated Musical Encyclopedia are combined with stylized or naturalistic shots of traditional festivals, street dancers, the urban built environment, and city life in 1980s Tokyo. Lennard has described the film as "the sounds of Tokyo—seen through the eyes of, and a portrait of, Sakamoto."

== Synopsis ==
The documentary opens with a shot of Sakamoto playing with an toy space gun in the park, reacting to the electronic sounds it makes, as a voiceover of his own voice quotes Debussy. This cuts to a scene of Sakamoto standing in front of an enormous scene in downtown Tokyo, which is playing footage from a YMO concert. Footage of Sakamoto recording in Onkio Haus studio jumps to a head-on shot of Sakamoto in colorful eye makeup commenting on the nonlinear possibilities of music in a digital age. Panning shots of urban Tokyo and Japanese trains and subways intercut with Sakamoto playing a piano riff in the studio over a multi-layered sample. Sakamoto in eye makeup speaks to the creative opportunities and challenges of living in Japan at a time when it has become an economic superpower. He speaks to people having a hunger for culture, as the film cuts to footage of people dancing to rock and roll or folk-inspired music in the street.

As the diegetic music of Sakamoto recording in the studio plays in the background, the camera cuts to blue-tinted footage of danchi apartment buildings, including shots of the tall central cavities equipped with nets to prevent fatal drops. Sakamoto relates his music philosophy to the camera, which then cuts to images of electronics superstores filled with televisions. Sakamoto plays the theme to the 1983 Nagisa Ōshima film Merry Christmas Mr. Lawrence on a grand piano over an excerpt of the film in which a Sgt. Gengo Hara (Beat Takeshi), so drunk he claims he's Santa Claus, absolves prisoners Lt. Col. John Lawrence (Tom Conti) and Maj. Jack "Strafer" Celliers (David Bowie) of a death sentence.

The camera follows Sakamoto hand-transcribing music on paper and testing it on piano as he speaks to the challenges of composing for film. He eats dinner in the studio and discusses the intensive selection process involved in assembling a track list for an album. Sakamoto demonstrates the use of a Fairlight CMI digital synthesizer loaded with floppy "memory discs" to create samples and loops which can also be rendered visually on a monitor. He then returns to the giant screen, this time playing footage from commercials he appeared in. The camera cuts to short sequences of Japanese street festivals and groups of celebrants carrying an omikoshi, which segues to concert footage of YMO playing the song "Tong Poo" on stage. The live footage is interleaved with a scene filmed by Lennard in which Sakamoto and then-wife Akiko Yano play a duet of "Tong Poo" on their grand piano at home.

Sakamoto answers a car phone and, in a mix of Japanese and French, explains that he's filmed "heaven" and that it was full of trees. He then enters the studio and performs his song "Self Portrait," which plays behind the closing credits.

== Cast ==
- Ryuichi Sakamoto
- Akiko Yano
- Haruomi Hosono (archival)
- Yukihiro Takahashi (archival)

== Production ==
Aided by a French film crew from the Institut national de l'audiovisuel, Lennard shot the film in Tokyo over the course of seven days in May 1985, four of which she spent with Sakamoto. Lennard, who does not speak Japanese, relied on an interpreter during filming, the voice of whom can be heard during the scene with the Fairlight synthesizer. Japanese dialogue was later transcribed and translated into French by Ryoji Nakamura for the subtitles.

== Release and reception ==
=== Original release ===
Ad for one-day Shibuya Public Hall screening at 1985 Tokyo Film Festival

In 1985, Tokyo Melody was screened at the Rotterdam Film Festival, the Locarno Film Festival, and the São Paulo International Film Festival. The Japanese premiere coincided with the inaugural Tokyo International Film Festival, screening at five times throughout the day on June 9, 1985, at Shibuya Public Hall.

The film played at Filmex in February 1985, then made its New York debut at the Museum of Modern Art on April 9, 1985, as part of the New Directors/New Films series, where it shared a bill with the Carma Hinton and Richard Gordon documentary Small Happiness: Women of a Chinese Village. Janet Maslin, writing for the New York Times, commented on the film's "naïve solemnity," while a full-page ad for the series in the Times described the film as a "jigsaw puzzle about Tokyo today." The film aired on France 3 in 1986 and was also played on NHK.

=== Screening history ===
Program cover for 1996 double feature of Tokyo Melody and Chris Marker's Le Mystère Koumiko

In the first three decades following its original release, Tokyo Melody was shown sporadically. In February 1996, the film was screened again in Tokyo sharing a bill with French artist Chris Marker's 1965 documentary Le Mystère Koumiko at BOX Higashi-Nakano. Billed as "Tokyo Timeslip 1964/1984: Through French Eyes," the double feature juxtaposed Lennard's view of the city from ten years prior with Marker's view from two decades before that, situating Lennard's film in a Tokyo of the past.

Following the MoMa screening, the documentary was not screened again in North America until 2019, when a Vancouver art space showed the film. Tokyo Melody returned to New York in February 2023 for four screenings at Spectacle Theater. On July 29, 2023, director Elizabeth Lennard's personal 16mm print of the film was screened at Japan Society as part of the Japan Cuts festival, the first time the print had been screened since it returned from São Paulo in 1985 missing frames that had been stolen and spliced over, Lennard speculated, as souvenirs.

=== Restoration ===
In March 2025, Sakamoto official social media accounts announced a 2026 roadshow of a 4K restored version of the film and launched an official website. Repertory screenings of the restoration were held throughout Japan in 2026. April of that year saw the film added to the Criterion Channel.

== Media ==
The documentary has been commercially released on VHS and DVD in Japan by Pony Canyon. Excerpts from Tokyo Melody, digitized from the original negative, appear in the 2017 Sakamoto documentary Coda to depict Sakamoto in his younger years. An NHK documentary on Sakamoto called 坂本龍一 芸術は長く、人生は短し Sakamoto Ryuichi: Art is Long, Life is Short that premiered in July 2023, with narration from Sakamoto's longtime friend Koji Yakusho, also incorporates clips from Lennard's documentary.
