= Long Bow Trilogy =

Chinese documentary film trilogy

The Long Bow Trilogy is a 1986 documentary film trilogy co-directed by Carma Hinton and Richard Gordon. The films focus on a variety of topics, but all depict life in Zhangzhuangcun (translated as Long Bow Village), a village in the Shanxi province of the People's Republic of China often known as the topic of the book Fanshen by Carma Hinton's father, William H. Hinton. Many of the people mentioned or interviewed for Fanshen appear in the films.

== Background ==
Although her father had worked extensively with the villagers of Long Bow, Carma Hinton did not have the idea of making films about the village until she witnessed villagers performing on stilts in 1977. Afterwards, she worked with Richard Gordon to make a 28-minute film titled Stilt Dancers of Long Bow Village in collaboration with GEO magazine. The reception to this film inspired further interest in filming the villagers, leading to the inception of the trilogy. The topics of each part of the trilogy were chosen, in part, based on the topics of interviews with the subject of the third film, Dr. Shen Fasheng.

== Films ==
Narration throughout the films is kept to a minimum, with emphasis placed on the testimony of people living in the village. The films were produced over three years, with the chronological production order being Small Happiness (1984), All Under Heaven (1985), and To Taste 100 Herbs (1986). All three films were edited by David Carnochan.

=== Part One: All Under Heaven ===
The first film discusses the religious and cultural traditions of the community in Long Bow Village, including a funeral, a country fair, and an open air opera performance. Although nominally about religion and culture, large parts of the film consist of interviews where village residents discuss the transition from collective farming to individual farming in China and the effects on the community. Long Bow prospered under collective management, which led to resistance when economic reforms dismantled the system. Although villagers agree the old system had problems with motivation (with workers getting paid merely for showing up to work), the new system creates problems as collectively purchased farming equipment becomes useless on small, privately owned plots. In this way, agriculture also becomes feminized, as women are left to tend to their husband's fields while the men take higher paying jobs. A vegetable farming entrepreneur in the village is one of the only people happy about the changes, stating that "everyone has to make some money- I'll make more and they'll make less." Another man, more bitter over the prospects, remarks that "When times get difficult, people will think of the collective and Chairman Mao." The resurgence in private personal wealth in the village has led to more lavish weddings, funerals, and festivals, many of which were prohibited in their traditional forms during the cultural revolution, and all are shown in the film.

=== Part Two: Small Happiness ===
The second film focuses on the advances and limitations of women's rights in China after the cultural revolution, including interviews with village women who discuss topics such as birth control and customs, the criminalization of foot binding, marriage, and love. The film is named for a village proverb that reflects gender roles: "To give birth to a boy is considered a big happiness. To give birth to a girl is a small happiness." The older women of the village reflect on the old customs such as foot binding as "horrors of another world," with one explaining how she was forced to smother her own baby due to famine pre-revolution. However, gender roles are not yet equal, with a woman testifying that she had to stop driving a tractor because it was not considered "convenient" for men and women to work together. Furthermore, government birth control, despite being more lenient in rural areas, affects women deeply, who are socially pressured to give birth to sons over daughters. A focal point of the film is a marriage scene, in which the bride begrudgingly takes part in a ceremony to honor the groom's ancestors, being heckled by his friends and family for the duration.

=== Part Three: To Taste 100 Herbs ===
In contrast to the first two films, the third film focuses largely on one individual: Dr. Shen Fasheng, a Catholic doctor who practices traditional Chinese medicine as well as Western medical practices. Although Dr. Shen is a minority in the village as a practicing Christian, he is considered an important member of the community by other villagers and garners respect. In addition to interviews regarding Catholicism, medical ethics, rural health care, and traditional medicine, the film also includes scenes of Christian prayer services. Dr. Shen also in part served as the inspiration for the trilogy as a whole, having helped solidify the focus of the films on religion, family, and medicine.

== Reception ==
The film trilogy was well received by scholars in Asian studies and has become a common classroom film, especially when shown after assigned readings of Fanshen and Shenfan, as many people mentioned in Hilton's works are depicted and interviewed in the films. Due to the significant emphasis placed on oral testimony, the film trilogy has been the subject of interest and review by oral historians.
