= A New Era of Thought =

Book by Charles Hinton in 1888

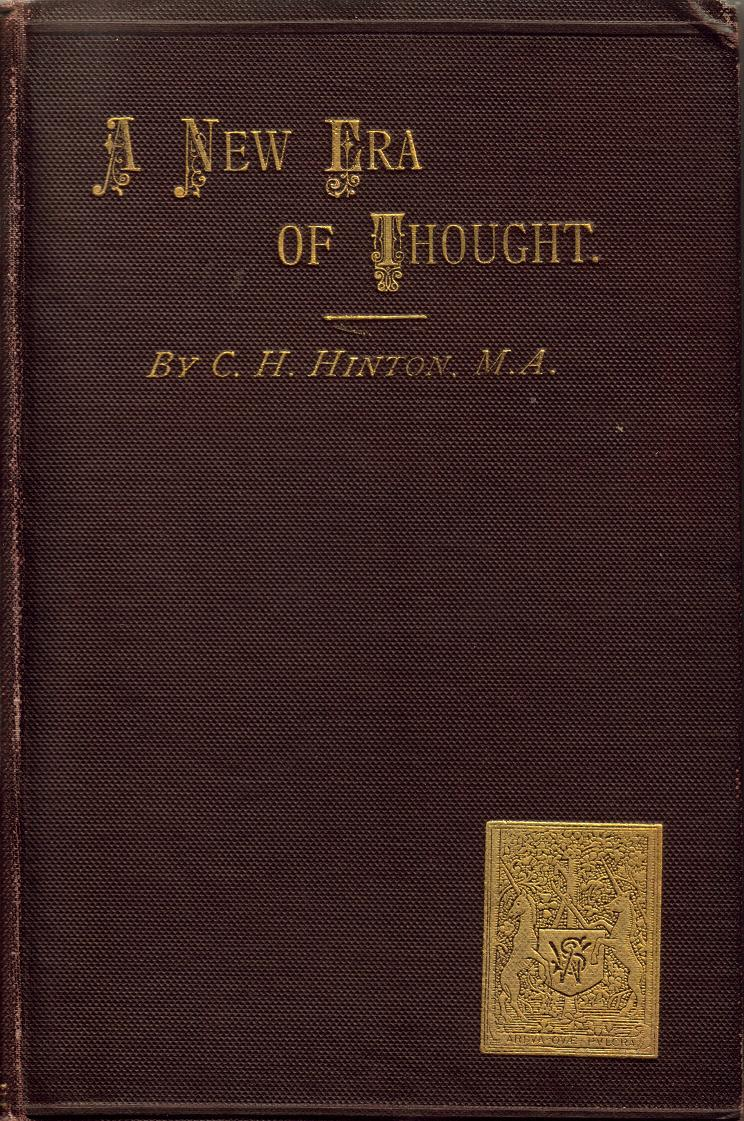
- Author: Charles Howard Hinton
- Subject: Four-dimensional space
- Published: 1888
- Pages: 230

A New Era of Thought is a non-fiction work written by Charles Howard Hinton, published in 1888 and reprinted in 1900 by Swan Sonnenschein & Co. Ltd., London. A New Era of Thought is about four-dimensional space and its implications on human thinking. The preface was written by Alicia Boole and H. John Falk. They also rewrote Part II which Hinton had sketched. The book has xvi and 230 pages.

== Context ==
A New Era of Thought is inspired by Plato's allegory of the cave and is influenced by the works of Immanuel Kant, Carl Friedrich Gauss and Nikolai Lobachevsky. It influenced the work of P.D. Ouspensky, particularly his book Tertium Organum where it is frequently quoted; Scientific American writer Martin Gardner, who mentioned this book in some of his articles; and Rudy Rucker's The Fourth Dimension.

== Synopsis ==
A New Era of Thought consists of two parts. The first part is a collection of philosophical and mathematical essays on the fourth dimension. These essays are somewhat disconnected. They teach the possibility of thinking four-dimensionally and about the religious and philosophical insights thus obtainable. In the second part Hinton develops a system of coloured cubes. These cubes serve as model to get a four-dimensional perception as a basis of four-dimensional thinking. This part describes how to visualize a tesseract by looking at several 3-D cross sections of it. The system of cubic models in A New Era of Thought is a forerunner of the cubic models in Hinton's book The Fourth Dimension.

== Contents ==
- Preface
- Table of Contents
- Introductory Note to Part I
- Part I
  - Introduction
  - Chapter I.
    - Scepticism and Science.
    - Beginning of Knowledge.
  - Chapter II.
    - Apprehension of Nature.
    - Intelligence.
    - Study of Arrangement or Shape.
  - Chapter III.
    - The Elements of Knowledge.
  - Chapter IV.
    - Theory and Practice.
  - Chapter V.
    - Knowledge: Self-Elements.
  - Chapter VI.
    - Function of Mind.
    - Space against Metaphysics.
    - Self-Limitations and its Test.
    - A Plane World.
  - Chapter VII.
    - Self Elements in our Consciousness.
  - Chapter VIII.
    - Relation of Lower and Higher Space.
    - Theory of the Aether.
  - Chapter IX.
    - Another View of the Aether.
    - Material and Aetherial Bodies.
  - Chapter X.
    - Higher Space and Higher Being.
    - Perception and Inspiration.
  - Chapter IX.
    - Space the Scientific Basis of Altruism and Religion.
- Part II
  - Chapter I.
    - Three-space.
    - Genesis of a Cube.
    - Appearances of a Cube to a Plane-being.
  - Chapter II.
    - Further Appearances of a Cube to a Plane-being.
  - Chapter III.
    - Four-space.
    - Genesis of a Tessaract; its Representation in Three-space.
  - Chapter IV.
    - Tessaract moving through Three-space.
    - Models of the Sections.
  - Chapter V.
    - Representation of Three-space by Names and in a Plane.
  - Chapter VI.
    - The Means by which a Plane-being would Acquire a Conception of our Figures.
  - Chapter VII.
    - Four-space: its Representation in Three-space.
  - Chapter VIII.
    - Representation of Four-space by Name.
    - Study of Tessaracts.
  - Chapter IX.
    - Further Study of Tessaracts.
  - Chapter X.
    - Cyclical Projections.
  - Chapter XI.
    - A Tessaractic Figure and its Projections.

Appendices

- A. 100 Names used for Plane Space.
- B. 216 Names used for Cubic Space.
- C. 256 Names used for Tessaractic Space.
- D. List of Colours, Names and Symbols.
- E. A Theorem in Four-Space.
- F. Exercises on Shapes of Three Dimensions.
- G. Exercises on Shapes of Four Dimensions.
- H. Sections of the Tessaract.
- K. Drawings of the Cubic Sides and Sections of the Tessaract (Models 1–12) with Colours and Names.
