= Mary Everest Boole =

Author of didactic works on mathematics

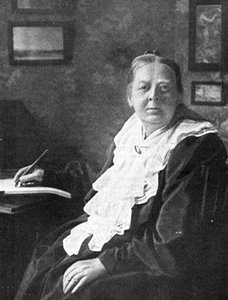
Mary Everest Boole

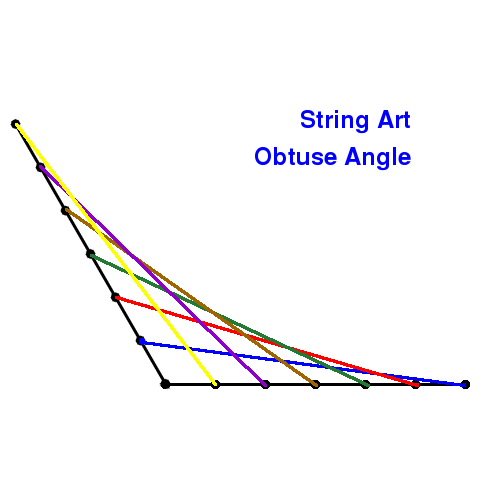
Curve stitching

Mary Everest Boole (11 March 1832 – 17 May 1916) was a self-taught mathematician married to logical pioneer George Boole during his years in Cork, Ireland. She is known as an author of didactic works on mathematics, such as Philosophy and Fun of Algebra. Her unconventional ideas on education, as expounded in The Preparation of the Child for Science, included encouraging children to explore mathematics through playful activities such as curve stitching. Her life is of interest to feminists as an example of how women made careers in an academic system that did not welcome them.

== Life ==
Mary Everest was born in Wickwar, Gloucestershire, England, the daughter of Reverend Thomas Roupell Everest, the rector of Wickwar, and Mary (née Ryall). Her uncle was George Everest, the surveyor and geographer after whom Mount Everest was named. She spent the first part of her life in France where she received an education in mathematics from a private tutor. On returning to England at the age of 11, she continued to pursue her interest in mathematics through self-instruction. Self-taught mathematician George Boole tutored her, and she visited him in Ireland where he held the position of professor of mathematics at Queen's College Cork. Upon the death of her father in 1855, they married and she moved to Cork. Mary greatly contributed as an editor to Boole's The Laws of Thought, a work on algebraic logic. She had five daughters with him.

She was widowed in 1864, at the age of 32, and returned to England, where she was offered a post as a librarian at Queen's College on Harley Street, London. In August 1865, her address was listed as 68 Harley Street in a Deed of Assignment in which she disposed of her husband's former house in Ireland, acting as the Executrix of his will. The deed was witnessed by "John Knights, Porter at Queens College, Harley Street, London and Jane White, Housekeeper at 68 Harley Street, London". As well as working as a librarian, she also tutored privately in mathematics and developed a philosophy of teaching that involved the use of natural materials and physical activities to encourage an imaginative conception of the subject. Her interest extended beyond mathematics to Darwinian theory, philosophy and psychology and she organised discussion groups on these subjects among others. At Queen's College, against the approval of the authorities, she organised discussion groups of students with the unconventional James Hinton, a promulgator of polygamy. This in part led to her mental breakdown and the dispersal of her children.

In later life, she belonged to the circle of the Tolstoyan pacifist publisher, C. W. Daniel; she chose the name The Crank for his magazine because, she said, 'a crank was a little thing that made revolutions'.

Mary took an active interest in politics, introducing her daughter Ethel to the Russian anti-tsarist cause under Sergei Stepniak. After the Boer war 1899–1902 she became more outspoken in her writings against imperialism, organized religion, the financial world and the tokenism she felt that Parliament represented. She opposed women's suffrage and probably for this reason has not generally been regarded as a feminist. She died in 1916, at the age of 84.

Boole was a practitioner of homeopathic medicine.

== Contributions to education ==
Mary first became interested in mathematics and teaching through her tutor in France, Monsieur Deplace. He helped her understand mathematics through questioning and journal writing. After marrying George Boole she began contributing to the scientific world by advising her husband in his work while attending his lectures, both of which were unheard of for a woman to do in that time period. During this time she also shared ideas with Victoria Welby, another female scholar and dear friend. They discussed everything from logic and mathematics, to pedagogy, theology, and science.

Her teaching first began while working as a librarian. Mary would tutor students with new methods; using natural objects, such as sticks or stones. She theorized that using physical manipulations would strengthen the unconscious understanding of materials learned in a classroom setting. One of her most notable contributions in the area of physical manipulations is curve stitching with the use of sewing cards, which she discovered as a form of amusement as a child. This helped to encourage the connections of mathematical concepts to outside sources.

Her book Philosophy and Fun of Algebra explained algebra and logic to children in interesting ways, starting with a fable, and including bits of history throughout. She references not only history, but also philosophy and literature, using a mystical tone to keep the attention of children. Mary encouraged the use of mathematical imagination with critical thinking and creativity. This, along with reflective journal writing and creating one's own formulas, was essential in strengthening comprehension and understanding. Cooperative learning was also important because students could share discoveries with each other in an environment of peer tutoring and develop new ideas and methods.

She worked on promoting her husband's works, with great attention to mathematical psychology. George Boole's main focus was on psychologism, and Mary provided a more ideological view of his work. She supported the idea that arithmetic was not purely abstract as many believed, but more anthropomorphic. Pulsation was also important in her works and could be described as a sequence of mental attitudes, with her attention being analysis and synthesis. She believed that Indian logic played a role in the development of modern logic by her husband George Boole and others.

=== Philosophy and Fun of Algebra ===
Mary's book, Philosophy and Fun of Algebra, was written and published in 1909. This book was designed to teach children algebra, although it is written less like a more traditional textbook and instead has a more comical and fanciful writing style. In the first chapter, "From Arithmetic to Algebra," Mary opens her book by explaining "Logos" or as she calls it "hidden wisdom" through an analogy with a tale about a King or Parliament passing an act that would be against the Logos described in her book. Moving onto chapter 2, "The Making of Algebras," Mary writes a about a story of two groups, the Arabs and their cousins who lived outside of Arabia, the Hebrews. She explains more about the uses of algebra, taking from her husbands form of algebra, Boolean Algebra. She further explains with an example of two babies, both of whom, in their own ways, learn about algebra. One baby touches a tea pot and finds it to be cool; another baby touches a different tea pot and finds it to be hot. Both children learned by "empirical experience."

Cover of Mary's textbook, Philosophy and Fun of Algebra

Chapter 3, "Simultaneous Problems," moves into the more mathematical side of algebra. Mary starts with three statements about three variables, "x equals half of y; y equals twice x; z equals x multiplied by y." She wants the reader to suppose that if x is Unity (1), then what would variables y and z be? Once the reader replaces x for 1, then it can be deduced whether x can or cannot be 1. Her next step is to suppose x is 0 and to repeat the previous procedure; then to do the same with making both y and z be 1 and 0. Once all three variables are tried for 1 or 0, one must experiment with other values (e.g. 2, 3, 4, etc.). Continuing into chapter 4, "Elements of Complexity," Mary resumes writing in a dialogue style way to explain the "provisional elimination of some elements of complexity." She describes this concept as trying to find which hypothetical values of x could help the reader to find the values of y and z.

The rest of the chapters go through concepts like mathematical certainty, the Boole method of algebra, Jacob's Ladder, √ −1, and infinity. Through all of this, she continues her familiar writing style of including folk tales, sorties, analogies, and easy to understand language for children. In the later chapters of her book, Mary makes many references to the bible and biblical figures, like Moses, Isaiah, and Elijah, of the Old Testament. Her stories and allusions to well-known figures helps to make her work more digestible to her intended audience, that being children, allowing them to understand mathematical concepts in a fun and engaging way.

== Spiritualism ==
Boole was interested in parapsychology and the occult, and was a convinced spiritualist. She was the first female member of the Society for Psychical Research which she joined in 1882. However, being the only female member at the time, she resigned after six months.

Boole was the author of the book The Message of Psychic Science for Mothers and Nurses. She revealed the manuscript to Frederick Denison Maurice who objected to its controversial ideas and this resulted in her losing her job as librarian at Queens College. The book was not published until 1883. It was later republished as The Message of Psychic Science to the World (1908).

== Family ==
Her five daughters made their marks in a range of fields.

- Mary Ellen (1856–1908) married mathematician Charles Hinton.
- Margaret (1858–1935) was the mother of mathematician G. I. Taylor.
- Alicia Boole Stott (1860–1940) became an expert in four-dimensional geometry.
- Lucy Everest (1862–1905) was a talented chemist and became the first woman Fellow of the Institute of Chemistry.
- Ethel Lilian (1864–1960) married the Polish revolutionary Wilfrid Michael Voynich and was the author of a number of works including The Gadfly.

Geoffrey Hinton is a great-grandson of Boole, and is well known for research in Artificial Intelligence (AI).

== Publications ==
- The Message of Psychic Science for Mothers and Nurses. London: Trübner & Co. 1883.
- Symbolical Methods of Study. K. Paul, Trench & co. 1884.
- The Preparation of the Child for Science. Oxford: The Clarendon Press. 1904.
- The Message of Psychic Science to the World. London: C. W. Daniel. 1908.
- Philosophy and Fun of Algebra. London: C. W. Daniel. 1909.
- The Forging of Passion into Power. M. Kennerley. 1911.
- E. M. Cobham, ed. (1931). Collected Works. in four volumes
- D.G. Tahta, ed. (1972). A Boolean Anthology: Selected Writings of Mary Boole—On Mathematical Education. Association of Teachers of Mathematics.
