= Caroline Haddon =

British philosophical writer

Caroline Haddon (15 April 1837 – 13 March 1905) was a British philosophical writer. She was the sister-in-law of James Hinton, "the great influence of her life", and she wrote several works about Hinton and his thought.

== Life ==
Caroline Haddon was born on 15 April 1837 in Finsbury, the daughter of John Haddon and Elizabeth Cort.

Haddon ran a girls' school in Dover. She paid for Havelock Ellis to pursue his study of medicine at St Thomas's Hospital. Together with her sister Margaret and Havelock Ellis, she championed Hinton's evolutionary mysticism within the Fellowship of the New Life. She supported Hinton's advocacy of polygamy, notably in an outspoken 1885 pamphlet The Future of Marriage which scandalised London radicals at the time, especially as rumour maintained that she had had an affair with Hinton before his death in 1875. In a talk she gave to the Fabian Society, 'The Two Socialisms', she was the first at the society to use the word 'socialism'.

Haddon died on 13 March 1905.

== Works ==
- (ed.) Philosophy and Religion: selections from the MSS. of J. Hinton by James Hinton, London: Kegan and Paul, 1881.
- A Law of Development: An Essay, London: J. Haddon, 1883
- The Larger Life: Studies in Hinton's Ethics, London: Kegan and Paul, 1886.
- Where does your interest come from?: a word to lady investors, 1886
