= Pieter Hendrik Schoute =

Dutch mathematician (1846–1913)

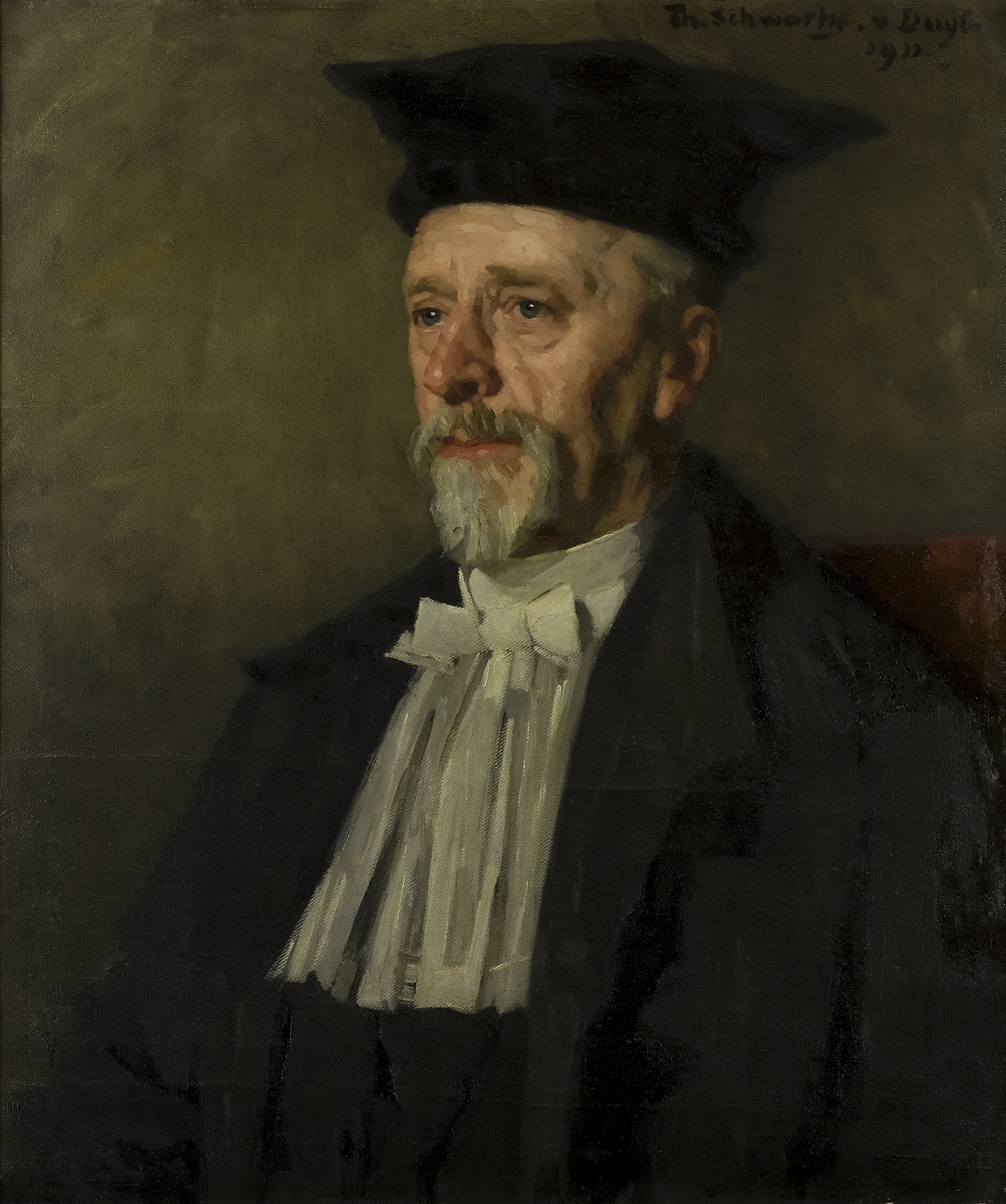
Pieter Hendrik Schoute

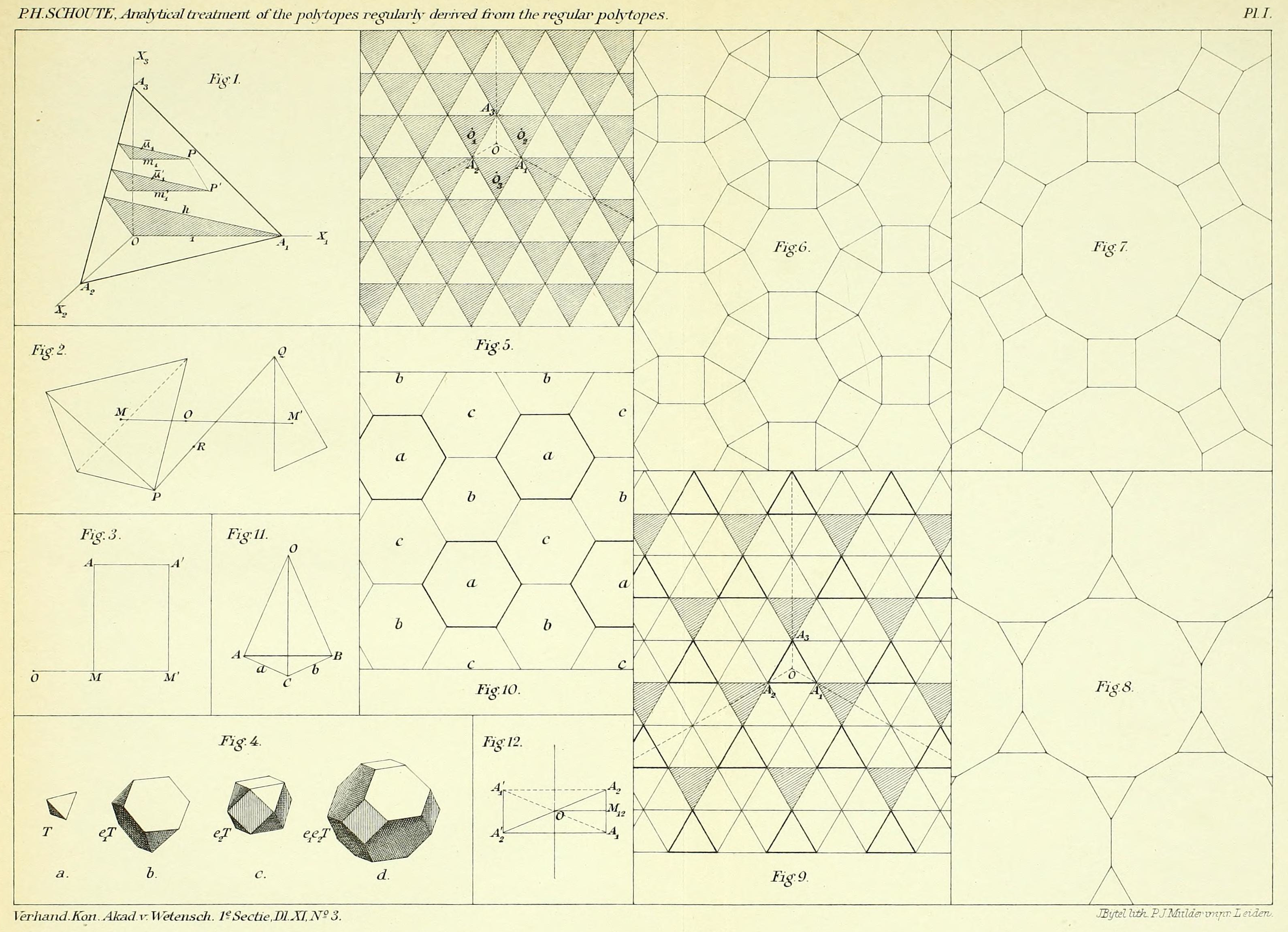
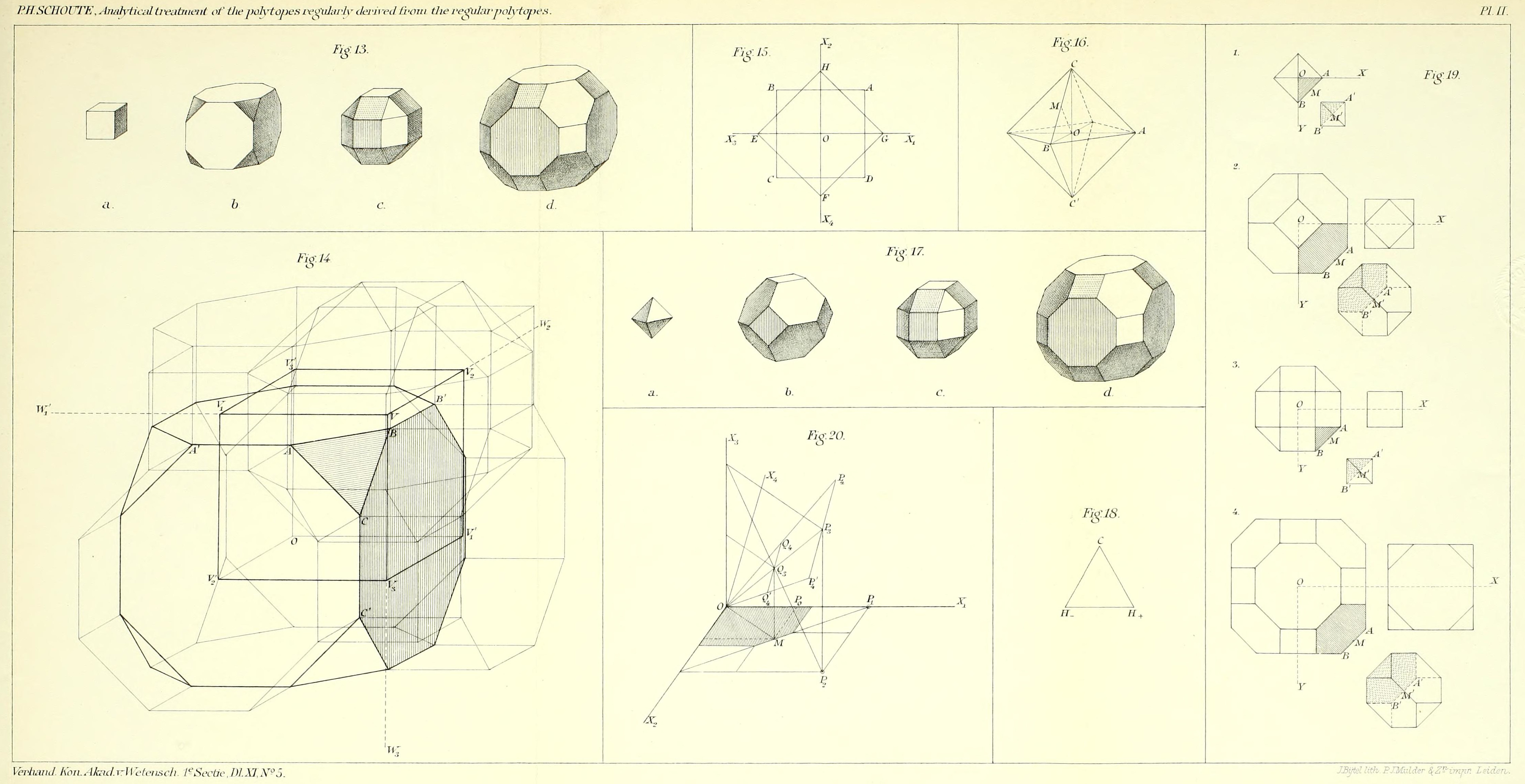
Illustrations from Analytical treatment... (1911) with uniform tilings, Archimedean solids and a runcitruncated cubic honeycomb

Pieter Hendrik Schoute (21 January 1846, Wormerveer – 18 April 1913, Groningen) was a Dutch mathematician known for his work on regular polytopes and Euclidean geometry.

He started his career as a civil engineer, but became a professor of mathematics at Groningen and published some thirty papers on polytopes between 1878 and his death in 1913. He collaborated with Alicia Boole Stott on describing the sections of the regular 4-polytopes.

In 1886, he became member of the Royal Netherlands Academy of Arts and Sciences.
