= Joan Hinton =

American nuclear physicist and supporter of Maoist China (1921–2010)

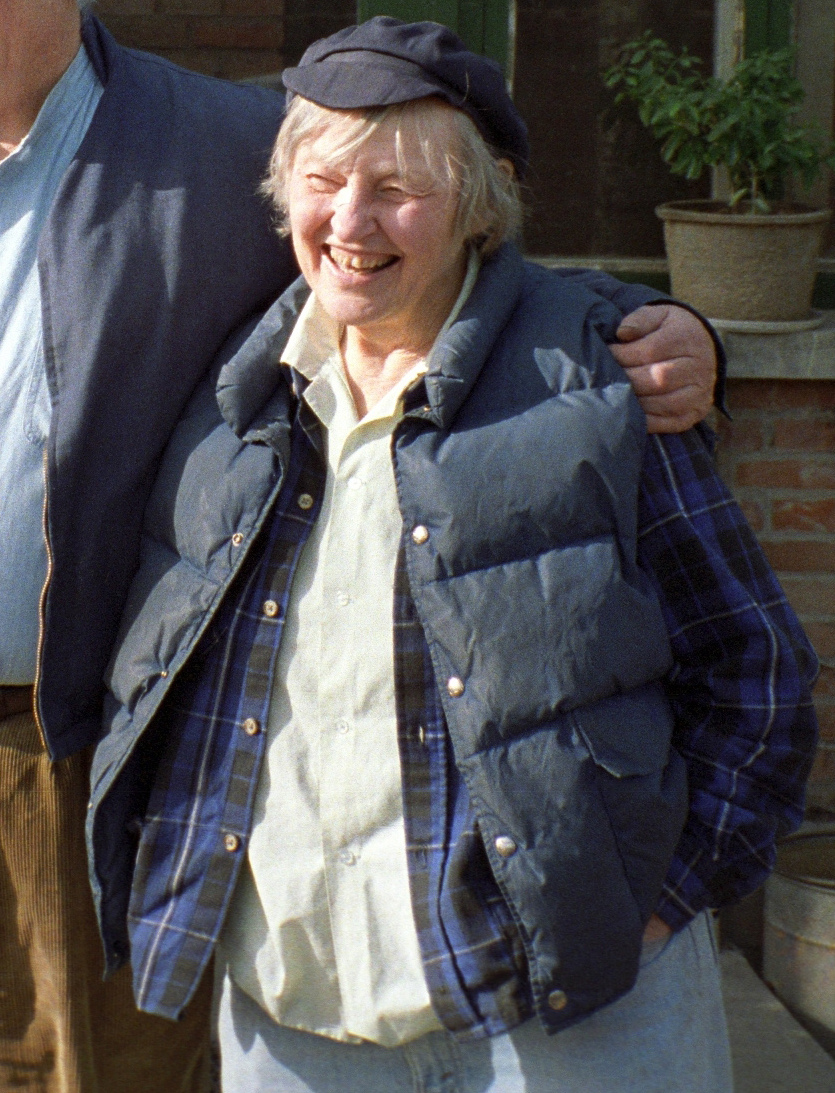
- Born: Joan Chase Hinton; October 20, 1921; Chicago, Illinois, U.S.
- Died: June 8, 2010 (aged 88); Beijing, China
- Other name: Chinese: 寒春
- Occupation: Nuclear physicist
- Spouse: Erwin Engst (m. 1949; death 2003)
- Parents: Sebastian Hinton (father); Carmelita Hinton (mother)
- Relatives: William H. Hinton (brother); Jean Hinton Rosner

Joan Hinton (Chinese name: 寒春, Pinyin: Hán Chūn; 20 October 1921 – 8 June 2010) was a nuclear physicist and one of the few female scientists who worked for the Manhattan Project in Los Alamos. Dismayed at the use of the atomic bomb against the Japanese, she went to live and work in China, staying on after the establishment of the People's Republic of China after 1949. She and her husband Erwin (Sid) Engst participated in China's efforts at developing a socialist economy, working extensively in agriculture, and supported the policies of Mao Zedong. She lived on a dairy farm north of Beijing before her death on June 8, 2010.

== Early life ==
On October 20, 1921, Hinton was born as Joan Chase Hinton in Chicago, Illinois. Her father, Sebastian Hinton, was a lawyer (who also was the inventor of the jungle gym); her mother, Carmelita Hinton, was an educator and the founder of The Putney School, an independent progressive school in Vermont.

=== Family background ===
Joan Hinton's great-grandfather was the mathematician George Boole, and her grandfather was the mathematician Charles Howard Hinton. Ethel Lilian Voynich, a great-aunt, was the author of The Gadfly, a novel later read by millions of Soviet and Chinese readers. Her sister, Jean Hinton Rosner (1917–2002), was a civil rights and peace activist. She was first cousin, once removed, with Geoffrey Hinton.

== Education ==
Hinton graduated from the Putney School, where her skiing skills qualified her for a berth on the 1940 U.S. Ski Team at the Winter Olympic Games, had they been held that year. She studied physics at Bennington College and graduated in 1942 with a bachelor's degree in natural science. In 1944, Hinton earned a doctorate in physics from University of Wisconsin.

== Career ==
=== Nuclear scientist ===
Hinton was in Los Alamos for the Manhattan Project. Under the supervision of Enrico Fermi, she calibrated neutron detectors to be used in the Alamogordo test.

She snuck in to watch the Trinity test; as she recalled:

It was like being at the bottom of an ocean of light. We were bathed in it from all directions. The light withdrew into the bomb as if the bomb sucked it up. Then it turned purple and blue and went up and up and up. We were still talking in whispers when the cloud reached the level where it was struck by the rising sunlight so it cleared out the natural clouds. We saw a cloud that was dark and red at the bottom and daylight on the top. Then suddenly the sound reached us. It was very sharp and rumbled and all the mountains were rumbling with it.

Joan Hinton was shocked when the US government, three weeks later, dropped nuclear bombs on Hiroshima and Nagasaki. She left the Manhattan Project and lobbied the government in Washington to internationalize nuclear power.

=== Moving to China ===
Her brother William H. Hinton (1919–2004) had travelled to China for the first time in 1937 and returned after the war. His book Fanshen: Documentary of Revolution in a Chinese Village, published in 1966 described his observations of land reform in the communist-occupied area of Northwest China. With his advice, in March 1948, Joan Hinton travelled to Shanghai, worked for Soong Ching-ling, the widow of President Sun Yat-sen, and tried to establish contacts with the Chinese communists. She witnessed the communists gaining control of Beijing in 1949 and moved to Yan'an, where she married Erwin Engst, who had been working in China since 1946. After 5 months living in caves in 1949 they moved to the border of Suiyuan to work on a state farm called Sanbien Farm, living meagerly in a stockaded village named Chungchuan without electricity or radios. At one point the village was attacked by bandits. No one knew in the U.S. of their whereabouts except family and a circle of scientists. In October 1952 Joan went public in Beijing, attending the Asia and Pacific Rim Peace Conference where she denounced the atomic bombing of Hiroshima. She was called "The Atom Spy Who Got Away", and questions were asked about her and her brother William during the Army–McCarthy hearings, but she never used her scientific training in China's nuclear program. In May 1955, she, Erwin, and their three young children moved to a farm near Xi'an. In April 1966 the family moved to Beijing to work as translators and editors at the beginning of the Cultural Revolution.

After 1956, Hinton finally obtained permanent residency to live in China and she chose to retain her US citizenship.

On August 29 (or in June, according to another source), 1966, Joan, Erwin and two other Americans living in China—Bertha Sneck (Shǐ Kè 史克, who had previously been married to Joan's brother William) and Ann Tompkins (Tāngpǔjīnsēn 汤普金森)—signed a big-character poster put up at the Foreign Experts Bureau in Beijing with the following text:

Which monsters and freaks are pulling the strings so foreigners get this kind of treatment? Foreigners working in China, no matter what class background they have, no matter what their attitude is toward the revolution, they all get the "five nots and two haves": the five nots—first: no physical labour, second: no thought reform, third: no chances of contacts with workers and peasants, fourth: no participation in class struggle, fifth: no participation in production struggle; the two haves—first: they have an exceptionally high living standard, second: they have all kinds of specialization. What kind of concept is that? This is Khrushchevism, this is revisionist thinking, this is class exploitation! [...] We demand: [...] Seventh: the same living standard and the same level of Chinese staff; eighth: no specialization any more. Long live the Great Proletarian Cultural Revolution!

A copy of the poster was shown to Mao Zedong, who issued a directive that "revolutionary foreign experts and their children should be treated the same as the Chinese."

In 1972, Joan and Erwin started working in agriculture again at the Red Star Commune in Daxing, Beijing. In June 1987, William Hinton went to the town of Dazhai in Shanxi province to observe the changes brought about by the reform policies, and in August 1987, Joan Hinton stayed at Dazhai as well.

In a 1996 interview with CNN, after nearly 50 years in China, she stated "[we] never intended to stay in China so long, but were too caught up to leave." Hinton described the changes she and her husband had witnessed in China since the beginning of the reform and opening up of Deng Xiaoping in the late 1970s. They stated they "have watched their socialist dream fall apart" as much of China embraced capitalism. A 2004 MSNBC interview noted her critical assessment of economic change as "betrayals of the socialist cause." She noted what she describes as a rise of exploitation in Chinese society.

Hinton lived alone following the death of her husband in 2003. Her three children moved to the United States, with Hinton noting that "They probably would have stayed if China were still socialist." Hinton retained her American citizenship, which she considered "convenient for travel." Her son, Yang Heping (Fred Engst) moved back to Beijing in 2007 as a professor at the University of International Business and Economics.

In her 2005 essay "The Second Superpower", Hinton stated, "There are two opposing superpowers in the world today: the U.S. on one side, and world public opinion on the other. The first thrives on war. The second demands peace and social justice."

She remained active in the small community of expats in Beijing, protesting against the war in Iraq.

== Personal life ==
In 1949, Hinton married Erwin Engst (1919–2003), a dairy-cattle expert, in Yan'an, Shaanxi Province, China. Hinton had two sons, Bill and Fred Engst and a daughter, Karen Engst. In 1923 Hinton's father checked himself into a clinic for treatment, but while there he committed suicide.

On June 8, 2010, Hinton died in Beijing, China. She was 88.

== References and further reading ==
=== English ===
- Cheng, Henry (17 June 2026), "Rethinking Comrade and Foreigner:Joan Hinton and the Boundaries of Belonging in Maoist China", Made in China
- Joan Hinton: From a Farm in Sian: Letter to Anna Louise Strong (January 12, 1963)
- Joan Hinton: The Second Superpower (Beijing International Peace Vigil)
- Rafal T. Prinke: The Booles and Related Families
- Li Jing: Beijing issues ‘green cards’ to foreigners (China Daily, August 23, 2004)
- Rob Gifford: Portraits of a Changing China—American Maoist Joan Hinton (National Public Radio, September 3, 2002)
- Caroline L. Herzenberg: Hyde Park Women in the Manhattan Project (Hyde Park Historical Society 2004)
- Hayford, Charles W. (15 July 2010), "Joan Hinton (1921-2010)", China Beat
- Staunch Proletarian Internationalists and Anti-imperialist Fighters (International Network for Philippine Studies, August 1, 2002)
- Robert F. Tinker: Science Standards: Promises and Dangers. In: Hands On!, (Cambridge: MA, TERC), v. 16, no.1 (Spring 1993) pp. 2, 17–19.
- Seth Faison: History's Fellow Travelers Cling to Mao's Road (New York Times, August 28, 1996)
- Andrea Koppel: Leftist Americans in China grieve shift to capitalism (CNN, October 1, 1996)—with photo of Sid Engst and Hinton
- Catherine Rampell: The atom spy that got away American defector to Maoist China not happy with 56 years of progress (NBC, August 13, 2004)
- Brauchli, Marcus. 'To foreigners who sought a new life, China's market reforms are a betrayal.' Wall Street Journal. 11 Sept. 1999.
- Rare blood donated to save American friend (China Daily, October 23, 2003)
- The Blonde Atomic Traitress Gerry Kennedy tells the story of Joan and William Hinton. Broadcast on BBC Radio 4, May 14, 2007

=== Chinese ===
- Zhōngguó nóngjīyuàn nóngjī shìyànzhàn jiǎnjiè 中国农机院农机试验站简介 (an introduction to Joan Hinton's farm; Chinese Academy of Agricultural Mechanization Sciences)
- Měi nǚ hédàn zhuānjiā Zhōngguó yǎng niú 57 nián cháng gěi zǒnglǐ dì zhǐtiáo 美女核弹专家中国养牛57年 常给总理递纸条 ) (An American woman nuclear bomb expert has been raising cattle in China for 57 years; she often writes to the prime minister; China Radio International, October 3, 2005
- Nà shì wǒ de gēgē Hán Dīng 那是我的哥哥韩丁 (That's my brother Bill Hinton; Haidian dang'anguan)
- Yáng Zhènníng 杨振宁: Yáng Zhènníng yǎn zhōng de tóngchuāng hǎoyǒu Dèng Jiàxiān 杨振宁眼中的同窗好友邓稼先 (Deng Jiaxian in the eyes of his good friend Yang Zhenning; October 13, 2004)
- Yáng Zǎo Hán Chūn duì Zhōngguó rǔyè zhī gòngxiàn 阳早寒春对中国乳业之贡献 (Erwin Engst and Joan Hinton's contributions to the Chinese dairy industry; Beijing Youth Daily, January 2004)
- Lǐ Yán 李言: Yī shēng gān wéi Zhōngguó niú 一生甘为中国牛 (Guangming Daily, May 26, 2004)
- Cānjiā "wéngé" de wàiguórén 参加“文革”的外国人 (Foreigners who participated in the "Cultural Revolution"; Hanwang, March 14, 2002)

== Literature ==
- Juliet de Lima-Sison (ed.), Dao-yuan Chou: Silage Choppers & Snake Spirits. The Lives & Struggles of Two Americans in Modern China. Ibon Books, Quezon 2009, ISBN 971-0483-37-4.
- Samuel A. Goudsmit Papers, 1921–1979, Box 41 Folder 13, on Joan Hinton, 1949–1978 (American Institute of Physics, Center for History of Physics; College Park, MD 20740).
- Ellis M. Zacharias: The Atom Spy Who Got Away (Real, 7/1953)
