= Bertha Sneck =

American translator and political activist (1916–2010)

Bertha Sneck (Chinese Name: Shǐ Kè 史克; 3 December 1916 in Maynard – 1 March 2010 in Beijing) was an American translator and political activist who lived in China.

== Biography ==
Born to Finnish ancestors; Her Father was David Sneck (born in Finland in 1886). Her Mother, Ida Maria Rossi (born in Finland in 1888). Her grandparents were Ida Sofia Juhontytär Kauppinen (born 1868 in Finland), and Matts Josefsson Salear (Sneck) (born in Finland in 1865)

Bertha Sneck moved to China in 1948 with her husband William H. Hinton. Their daughter Carma Hinton was born there. Sneck worked from 1949 to 1963 in the Foreign Languages Institute of Beijing and from 1964 to 1972 for the Newspaper "China in Pictures".

In June 1966 she and three other Americans – Ann Tompkins, Joan Hinton and "Sid" Erwin Engst – wrote a large-character poster (dàzìbào 大字报), in which they demanded to be treated exactly the same way that their Chinese colleagues were and to be allowed to engage in political activities. A copy of the poster was given to Mao Zedong, who praised it.

From 1972 to her retirement, Bertha Sneck worked for the newspaper Beijing Review and the magazine Chinese Literature. In 1984 the State Council recognized her for exceptional service.

== Footnotes ==
↑ Chou 2009, S. 350; 毛泽东：对四位美国专家的一张大字报的批语 (8. September 1966). In: 《建国以来毛泽东文稿》. Beijing: 中央文献出版社, 1998, Vol. 12, p. 126f., ISBN 7-5073-0397-7 and 毛泽东：对四位美国专家的一张大字报的批示 (29 August 1966). In: 《毛泽东思想万岁》 Vols. 1961–1968, p. 350, Beijing: Samisdat, (2005?).
