= William H. Hinton =

American intellectual (1919–2004)

William Hinton
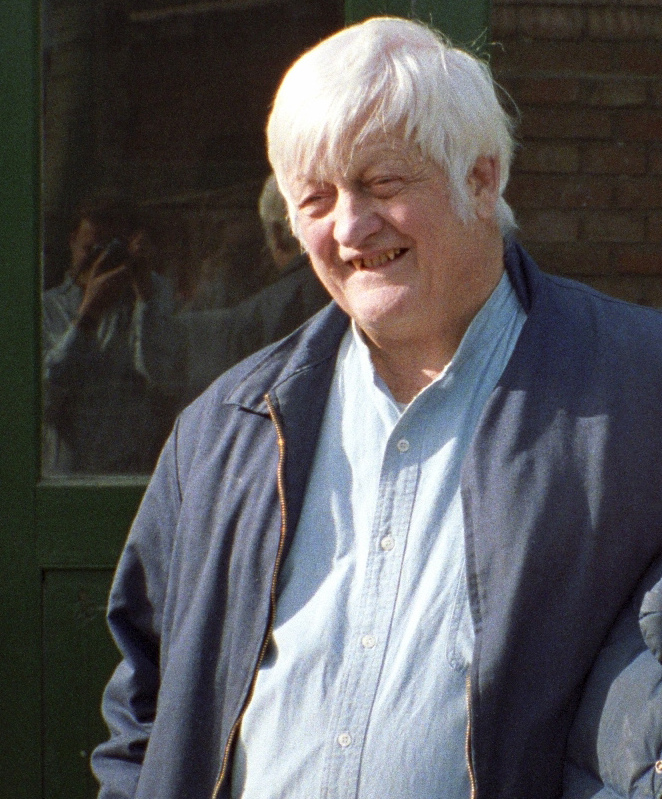
- Hinton in 1993
- Born: William Howard Hinton; February 2, 1919; Chicago, Illinois, U.S.
- Died: May 15, 2004 (aged 85); Concord, Massachusetts, U.S.
- Education: Harvard University; Cornell University (BS)
- Occupations: Writer; political scientist
- Movement: Maoism
- Spouses: Bertha Sneck (m. 1941; div. 1954) Joanne Raiford (m. 1958; died 1986) Katherine Chiu (m. 1987)
- Children: 4, including Carma
- Mother: Carmelita Hinton
- Relatives: Charles Hinton (grandfather); Ethel Voynich (great-aunt); Joan Hinton (sister)

William Howard Hinton (Chinese: 韩丁; pinyin: Hán Dīng; February 2, 1919 – May 15, 2004) was an American intellectual, known for his work on communism in China. He authored the book Fanshen, published in 1966, a "documentary of revolution" which chronicled the land reform program of the Chinese Communist Party (CCP) in the 1940s in Zhangzhuangcun (张庄村, pinyin: Zhāngzhuāngcūn), sometimes translated as Long Bow Village, a village in Shanxi Province in northern China. Sequels (Shenfan) followed the experience of the village during the 1950s and Cultural Revolution. Hinton wrote and lectured extensively to explain the Maoist approach and later to criticize Deng Xiaoping's reform and opening up.

== Early life and education ==
Hinton was born on February 2, 1919, in Chicago. His great-grandfather was the mathematician George Boole, his grandfather was the mathematician Charles Howard Hinton, and his father, Sebastian Hinton, was a lawyer who invented the playground jungle gym before later committing suicide. His mother, Carmelita Hinton, was an educator and the founder of The Putney School, an independent progressive school in Vermont. His great-aunt was novelist Ethel Lilian Voynich (1864–1960), whose 1897 book The Gadfly sold over a million copies and became the number one American bestseller in the Soviet Union during the Cold War. Hinton's sister, Joan Hinton, was a physicist who worked on the Manhattan Project in Los Alamos, New Mexico before moving to Beijing and becoming a Maoist.

Hinton attended Harvard University for two years, where he was captain of the ski team. In 1939, he raced the famous Inferno race from the summit of Mount Washington, skiing behind Toni Matt, who famously schussed the headwall. Hinton commented in 1996 that "he knew Matt did something special, as a huge roar came up from the crowd." Hinton earned a Bachelor of Science degree in agronomy and dairy husbandry from Cornell University in 1941.

== Career ==
=== Experiences in China ===
Hinton first visited China in 1937. At the time, prevailing U.S. views of the Chinese Communist Party since the 1920s had alternated between uncertainty and hostility. Most U.S. "experts" on communism were baffled by the appeal of a Marxist-Leninist party to Asian peasants. Some diplomats considered the Chinese Communist Party "agrarian reformers" who labeled themselves revolutionaries. They were uncertain whether or how closely the Communists were tied to the Soviet Union.

Given the attention lavished on the Kuomintang (KMT) by both U.S. President Franklin D. Roosevelt and the media, especially Henry Luce's Time Magazine, the U.S. public was slow to take notice of the Communists' rise in importance in China. When the U.S. joined China and the other Allied Powers of the Second World War in the War against Japan, there had been little contact between U.S. diplomats and the CCP, even though the KMT-led United Front against Japan made the Communists an implicit ally.

At the time of Hinton's first visit to China in the mid-1930s, a handful of U.S. journalists, such as Edgar Snow, Helen Foster Snow, and Owen Lattimore, had sneaked through the KMT blockade into communist territory. All praised the high morale, social reform, and commitment to fighting Japan that they observed.

Along with academic colleagues, Hinton made similar observations when he served from 1945 to 1953 during his subsequent visit to China. Hinton was a staff member of the U.S. Office of War Information and was present at the Chongqing negotiations between the Kuomintang and the Chinese Communist Party, where he met Zhou Enlai and Mao Zedong.

Hinton then worked for the United Nations as a tractor-technician, providing training in modern agricultural methods in rural China. When the United Nations program in the communist-led area ended in 1947, he accepted a position teaching at a Party-run university. Shortly thereafter, roughly half the faculty and staff left to join land reform work teams. Hinton asked to join the university-staffed work team going to the village of Zhang Zhuang (now popularly rendered in English as Long Bow, due to Hinton's writing), which was within walking distance of the university and on the outskirts of Changzhi. By 1948, his then-wife Bertha Sneck had also joined him in China.

Hinton spent eight months working in the fields in the day and attending land reform meetings both day and night, and during this time he took careful notes on the land reform process. He assisted in the development of mechanized agriculture and education, and mainly stayed in the CCP-governed northern Chinese village of Changzhi, forging close bonds with the inhabitants. Hinton aided the locals with complicated CCP initiatives, especially literacy projects, the breaking up of the feudal estates, ensuring the equality of women, and the replacement of the imperial-era magistrates that governed the village with councils in a symbiotic relationship with the landed gentry class. Hinton took more than one thousand pages of notes during his time in China.

=== Return to the United States ===
On his return to the United States after the conclusion of the Korean War in 1953, Hinton wanted to chronicle his observations of the revolutionary process in Long Bow. But on his return, at the height of McCarthyism, customs officials seized his papers, and turned them over to the Senate Committee on Internal Security (chaired by Senator James Eastland). Hinton was subjected to continual harassment by the FBI, his passport was confiscated, and he was barred from all teaching jobs. At first permitted to work as a truck mechanic, he was later blacklisted and denied all employment. He then took up farming on some land inherited from his mother, and farmed for a living for some fifteen years. During this period Hinton continued to speak out about the successes of the Chinese Communist Revolution and waged a long (and eventually successful) legal battle to recover his notes and papers from the Eastland Committee.

After the government returned his notes and papers, Hinton set to writing Fanshen, a documentary account of the land reform in Long Bow village in which he had been both observer and participant. After many mainstream U.S. publishers had turned it down, it was published in 1966 by Monthly Review and was a success, selling hundreds of thousands of copies, with translations in ten languages. In the book, Hinton examines the revolutionary experience of the Long Bow village, painting a complex picture of conflict, contradiction and cooperation in rural China. Hinton's book did not shy away from discussing the violence of land reform in Long Bow. In Hinton's view, peasant liberation justified class struggle.

After the death of Edgar Snow, Hinton became the most famous of Americans sympathetic to the People's Republic of China, and he served as the first national chairman of the US–China Peoples Friendship Association from 1974 to 1976. The association published his interviews with Chinese premier Zhou Enlai. Hinton cooled toward official policy as market reforms under Deng Xiaoping moved away from the type of socialism originally associated with Mao Zedong. Eventually, he wrote Shenfan (read as the opposite of Fanshen) and The Great Reversal, and became an outspoken opponent of the socialist market economy ("socialism with Chinese characteristics") and the reform and opening up that the CCP continues today.

== Personal life ==
In 1945, Hinton married Bertha Sneck, a writer and translator. They had one daughter, Carma Hinton, an academic and documentary filmmaker. Hinton and Sneck divorced in 1954. In 1958, Hinton married Joanne Raiford, a metallurgical technician, and had three more children. Raiford died in 1986, and Hinton married Katherine Chiu, an employee of UNICEF, in 1987.

In 2004, Hinton died in Concord, Massachusetts at the age of 85.

== Works ==
- 1966, Fanshen: A Documentary of Revolution in a Chinese Village, Monthly Review Press, ISBN 0-520-21040-9, ISBN 0-85345-046-3, ISBN 0-394-70465-7, ISBN 1-58367-175-7.
- —— (1970). Iron Oxen; a Documentary of Revolution in Chinese Farming. New York: Monthly Review Press.
- —— (1969). "Fanshen" Re-Examined in the Light of the Cultural Revolution. Boston, MA: New England Free Press.
- 1972, Hundred Day War: The Cultural Revolution at Tsinghua University, Monthly Review Press, ISBN 0-85345-281-4, ISBN 0-85345-238-5.
- 1972, Turning Point in China: An Essay on the Cultural Revolution, Monthly Review Press, ISBN 0-85345-215-6.
- 1984, Shenfan, Vintage, ISBN 0-394-72378-3, ISBN 0-330-28396-0, ISBN 0-394-48142-9.
- 1989, The Great Reversal: The Privatization of China, 1978-1989, Monthly Review Press, ISBN 0-85345-794-8, ISBN 0-85345-793-X.
- 1995, Ninth Heaven to Ninth Hell: The History of a Noble Chinese Experiment (with Qin Huailu and Dusanka Miscevic), Barricade Books, ISBN 1-56980-041-3. About Chen Yonggui and Dazhai.
- —— (2003). "Background Notes to Fanshen". Monthly Review. 55 (5): 45. doi:10.14452/MR-055-05-2003-09_7.
- 2006, Through a Glass Darkly: American Views of the Chinese Revolution, Monthly Review Press, ISBN 1-58367-141-2. A critique of Edward Friedman, Paul G. Pickowicz, Mark Selden, Chinese Village, Socialist State, Yale University Press 1991, ISBN 0-300-05428-9.

== See also ==
- Joan Hinton
- Carma Hinton
- Bertha Sneck
