= Lucy Everest Boole =

British chemist and pharmacist (1862-1904)

- Born: 5 August 1862; Cork, Ireland
- Died: 5 December 1904 (aged 42)
- Scientific career
- Fields: Chemistry, pharmacy
- Workplaces: London School of Medicine for Women

Lucy Everest Boole FRIC (5 August 1862 – 5 December 1904) was a British chemist and pharmacist who was the first woman to research pharmacy in England. She was the first female professor at the London School of Medicine for Women in the Royal Free Hospital, and the first female Fellow of the Royal Institute of Chemistry.

== Early life and education ==
Boole was born in 1862 in Cork, Ireland, where her father, mathematician and logician George Boole, was professor at Queen's College. Her mother, Mary Everest Boole, was a self-taught mathematician and educationalist with an interest in pedagogy. Lucy was the fourth of five sisters, many of whom were also notable. Her sister Alicia Boole was a mathematician and her sister Ethel Lilian Voynich was a novelist. George Boole died in 1864 leaving the family poor; they returned to Britain, where her mother became a librarian at Queen's College, London. Lucy worked as a librarian and residence supervisor at Queens' College but received no university education. She attended the London School of Pharmacy from 1883 to 1888 where she pursued her training as a pharmacist and passed her Major Examination in 1888.

== Professional career ==
Shortly after finishing her education at the London School of Pharmacy, Lucy became the research assistant of Wyndham Dunstan, a chemistry professor of the Pharmaceutical Society. She became a lecturer and demonstrator in chemistry in 1881 at the London School of Medicine in 1893. In 1894, she was elected the first female fellow of the Institute of Chemistry. It is thought that she was the first female professor of Chemistry at Royal Free Hospital, London. She published collectively with Sir Wyndham Dunstan, including a paper 'An Enquiry into the Vessicating Constituent of Croton Oil', becoming the first woman to co-author a paper regarding research in the pharmaceutical field. In this paper, she proposed a new analytical method for tartar emetic using gravimetric techniques as opposed to the previous volumetric techniques. Despite the strong criticism received for Lucy's proposal, it became the official method of assay in the British Pharmacopeia from 1898 to 1963.

== Publications and contributions ==
- Dunstan, Wyndham Rowland; Boole, Lucy Everest (1 January 1896). "An enquiry into the nature of the vesicating constituent of croton oil". Proceedings of the Royal Society of London. 59 (353–358): 237–249. doi:10.1098/rspl.1895.0083.
- Cash, John Theodore; Dunstan, Wyndham Rowland (1 January 1893). "VIII. The physiological action of the nitrites of the paraffin series, considered connection with their chemical constitution". Philosophical Transactions of the Royal Society of London B. 184: 505–639. doi:10.1098/rstb.1893.0008.

== Later life ==
Lucy Boole never married and lived with her mother in Notting Hill, London. Her mother summarized her career: "Lucy Everest Boole: never at any college. Learned Chemistry in order to qualify as dispenser or shop assistant in pharmacy. Became Fellow of the Institute of Chemistry, Lecturer in Chemistry and Head of Chemical Laboratories at London School of Medicine for Women." She became ill in 1897 and died in 1904 at the age of 42. Little more is known about her life and works.
