= Alicia Boole Stott =

Irish mathematician (1860–1940)

- Born: 8 June 1860; Cork, Ireland
- Died: 17 December 1940 (aged 80); Middlesex, England
- Citizenship: British
- Known for: Four-dimensional space Polytopes
- Parents: George Boole (father); Mary Everest Boole (mother)

Alicia Boole Stott (8 June 1860 – 17 December 1940) was a British mathematician. She made a number of contributions to the field and was awarded an honorary doctorate from the University of Groningen. She grasped four-dimensional geometry from an early age, and introduced the term "polytope" for a convex solid in four or more dimensions.

== Early life ==
Alicia Boole was born in Cork, Ireland, the third of five daughters of English parents: the mathematician and logician George Boole and Mary Everest Boole, a self-taught mathematician and educationalist. Of her sisters, Lucy Everest Boole was a chemist and pharmacist and Ethel Lilian Voynich was a novelist.

Alicia's father died from a fever in 1864, when Alicia was four. Facing poverty, Alicia's mother moved the family to London, where Mary became the librarian at Queen's College, London. Alicia, unlike her sisters, remained in Cork and stayed with her grandmother and great uncle. When Alicia was 11 she rejoined her mother and sisters in London.

Mary researched mathematics and educational methods aside from her work as a teacher, and she later wrote about the use of geometric models for early childhood mathematical education. Irene Polo-Blanco suggests it is likely that Mary used these methods in teaching math to her daughters. At the time, formal mathematical education was not available or encouraged for most women, and Alicia mostly learned from her mother and the first two books of Euclid.

Alicia attended the school attached to Queens' College with one of her sisters, but never attended university.

== Career ==
=== Early ===
Stott was the only Boole sister to inherit the mathematical career of her parents, although her mother Mary Everest Boole had brought up all of her five children from an early age "to acquaint them with the flow of geometry" by projecting shapes onto paper, hanging pendulums etc.

Stott was first exposed to geometric models of higher-dimensional spaces by her brother-in-law Charles Howard Hinton when she was 17, and she developed the ability to visualise four-dimensional space. Hinton had crafted 4D models with wooden cubes and shared these with the Boole sisters. Eventually, Stott grew better than Hinton at understanding higher-dimensional geometry. Hinton's cubes later became a popular and notoriously difficult method of attempting to understand 4D geometry. Stott was one of the only people known to have mastered the technique.

Stott found that there are exactly six regular convex 4-polytopes. That discovery had been made by Ludwig Schläfli before 1850 but his work had not yet been published. She introduced the term polytope because she did not know Schläfli's term polyscheme. She produced three-dimensional central cross-sections of all the six regular polytopes in four dimensions by purely Euclidean constructions and synthetic methods since she had never learned any analytic geometry. She made cardboard models of all these sections.

=== Late ===
Stott contributed to parts of Hinton's 1888 introduction to higher-dimensional reasoning, A New Era of Thought. She wrote about sections of 3D solids, and authored part of the preface. Stott began secretarial work near Liverpool by 1889.

In 1895, Stott learned of Pieter Schoute's work on central sections of the regular polytopes from her husband. Stott saw that drawings from Schoute's papers matched her 3D models, and mailed him photographs of her work. Schoute asked to meet and collaborate, and the pair began a partnership that lasted until his death two decades later. They corresponded via letters, but in some early summers, Schoute visited Stott and stayed with her family in England as they worked together. He later convinced her to publish her results, which she did in two papers published in Amsterdam in 1900 and 1910. Stott and Schoute also collaborated on papers published in 1908 and 1910. The pair presented Stott's models in 1907 at the annual British Association of the Advancement of Science meeting in Leicester. In 1912 at the 5th International Congress of Mathematicians in Cambridge, Schoute presented his work on semiregular polytopes and credited Stott with the roots of his proof. Stott created complete sets of models of the 120-cell and 600-cell, and left them with Schoute.

The University of Groningen honoured her by inviting her to attend the tercentenary celebrations of the university and awarding her an honorary doctorate in 1914. After Schoute's death in 1913 Alicia took a hiatus from mathematical work.

In 1930 she was introduced by her nephew Geoffrey Ingram Taylor to Harold Scott MacDonald Coxeter and they worked together on various problems. Alicia made two further important discoveries relating to constructions for polyhedra related to the golden section. She presented a joint paper with Coxeter at the University of Cambridge. Coxeter later wrote, "The strength and simplicity of her character combined with the diversity of her interests to make her an inspiring friend."

== Personal life ==
Stott was known to her friends and family as Alice, though she always published under the name Alicia.

Stott met and married Walter Stott, an actuary, in 1890 near Liverpool. They had two children together, Mary (1891–1982) and Leonard (1892–1963). Her son Leonard became a physician and inventor.

== Death and legacy ==
Alicia Boole Stott died in Middlesex in 1940. In spring 2001, a paper roll of coloured drawings of polyhedra was found at Groningen University. Though unsigned, it was immediately recognised as Alicia's work.

Stott's models are kept at the University of Groningen and The Faulkes Institute for Geometry at Cambridge.

Stott was the first person to write the English word "polytope" and popularized the term. Reinhold Hoppe originated the German word polytop in 1882, and Stott anglicized the word to refer to the 4D forms she studied.

== Works ==
- 1900: "On certain series of sections of the regular four-dimensional hypersolids", Verhandelingen der Koninklijke Akademie van Wetenschappen te Amsterdam VII (3), 21 pages, 5 plates.
- — (1910). "Geometrical deduction of semiregular from regular polytopes and space fillings" (PDF). Verhandelingen der Koninklijke Akademie van Wetenschappen te Amsterdam. XI (1). Amsterdam: Johannes Müller. Archived from the original (PDF) on 29 April 2025.

== See also ==
- Leonardo polyhedron
