= Charles Howard Hinton =

British mathematician and author (1853–1907)

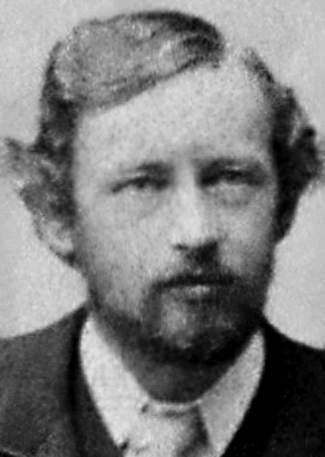
- Hinton, c. 1890.
- Born: 1853; London, England
- Died: 30 April 1907 (aged 54); Washington, D.C., U.S.
- Education: Cheltenham College
- Spouses: Mary Ellen Boole (m. 1880) Maud Weldon (m. 1883)
- Children: 6
- Father: James Hinton
- Relatives: Ada Nettleship

Charles Howard Hinton (1853 – 30 April 1907) was a British mathematician and writer of science fiction works titled Scientific Romances. He was interested in higher dimensions, particularly the fourth dimension. He is known for coining the word "tesseract" and for his work on methods of visualising the geometry of higher dimensions.

== Life ==
Hinton's father, James Hinton, was a surgeon and advocate of polygamy. Charles Hinton was born in England. His siblings included the costume designer Ada Nettleship (1856 – 1932).

Hinton taught at Cheltenham College while he studied at Balliol College, Oxford, where he obtained his B.A. in 1877. From 1880 to 1886, he taught at Uppingham School in Rutland, where Howard Candler, a friend of Edwin Abbott Abbott's, also taught. Hinton received his M.A. from Oxford in 1886.

In 1880, Hinton married Mary Ellen Boole, daughter of Mary Everest Boole and George Boole, the founder of mathematical logic. The couple had four children: George (1882–1943), Eric (born 1884), William (1886–1909) and Sebastian (1887–1923) (inventor of the jungle gym and father of William and Joan Hinton).

In 1883, he went through a marriage ceremony with Maud Florence Weldon, by whom he had had twin children, under the assumed identity of John Weldon. He was subsequently convicted of bigamy and spent three days in prison, losing his job at Uppingham. His father James Hinton was a radical advocate of polygamous relationships, and according to Charles' mother James had once remarked to her: "Christ was the saviour of Men but I am the saviour of Women and I don't envy him a bit."

In 1887, Charles moved with Mary Ellen to Japan to work in a mission before accepting a job as headmaster of the Victoria Public School. In 1893, he sailed to the United States on the SS Tacoma to take up a post at Princeton University as an instructor in mathematics.

In 1897, he designed a gunpowder-powered baseball pitching machine for the Princeton baseball team's batting practice. The machine was versatile, capable of variable speeds with an adjustable breech size, and firing curve balls by the use of two rubber-coated steel fingers at the muzzle of the pitcher. He successfully introduced the machine to the University of Minnesota, where Hinton worked as an assistant professor until 1900, when he resigned to move to the U.S. Naval Observatory in Washington, D.C.

At the end of his life, Hinton worked as an examiner of chemical patents for the United States Patent Office. At age 54, he died unexpectedly of a cerebral hemorrhage on 30 April 1907 in Washington, D.C. After Hinton's sudden death his wife, Mary Ellen, committed suicide, also in Washington, D.C., in May 1908.

== Fourth dimension ==
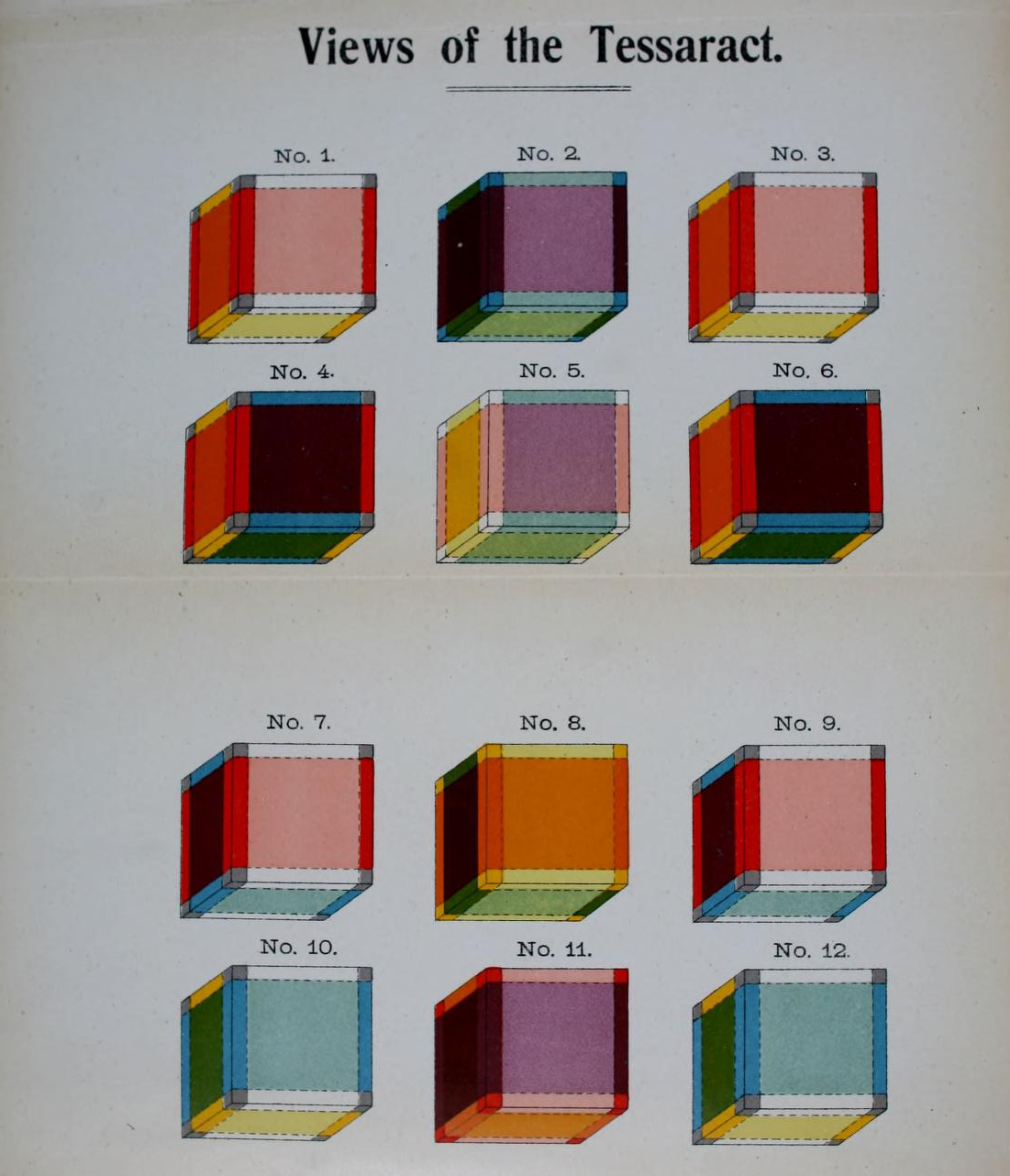
Frontispiece to Charles Howard Hinton's 1904 book The Fourth Dimension, illustrating the tesseract, the four-dimensional analog of the cube. Hinton's spelling varied: also known, as here, "tessaract".

In an 1880 article entitled "What is the Fourth Dimension?", Hinton suggested that points moving around in three dimensions might be imagined as successive cross-sections of a static four-dimensional arrangement of lines passing through a three-dimensional plane, an idea that anticipated the notion of world lines. Hinton's explorations of higher space had a moral basis:

Hinton argues that gaining an intuitive perception of higher space required that we rid ourselves of the ideas of right and left, up and down, that inheres in our position as observers in a three-dimensional world. Hinton calls the process "casting out the self", equates it with the process of sympathizing with another person, and implies the two processes are mutually reinforcing.

Hinton created several new words to describe elements in the fourth dimension. According to the OED, he first used the word tesseract in 1888 in his book A New Era of Thought. Alicia Boole Stott, his sister in law who knew him at Oxford, supervised the publication of the book whilst he was abroad. He also invented the words kata (from the Greek for "down from") and ana (from the Greek for "up toward") to describe the additional two opposing fourth-dimensional directions (an additional 4th axis of motion analogous to left-right (x), up-down (y), and forwards-backwards (z)).

Hinton's Scientific romances, including "What is the Fourth Dimension?" and "A Plane World", were published as a series of nine pamphlets by Swan Sonnenschein & Co. during 1884–1886. In the introduction to "A Plane World", Hinton referred to Abbott's recent Flatland as having similar design but different intent. Abbott used the stories as "a setting wherein to place his satire and his lessons. But we wish in the first place to know the physical facts." Hinton's world existed along the perimeter of a circle rather than on an infinite flat plane. He extended the connection to Abbott's work with An Episode of Flatland: Or How a Plane Folk Discovered the Third Dimension (1907).

== An Episode of Flatland or How a Plane Folk Discovered the Third Dimension… (1907) ==
An Episode of Flatland or How a Plane Folk Discovered the Third Dimension, to which is bound up An Outline of the History of Unæa made its public debut in 1907, It received an unflattering paragraph review in the British scientific journal Nature (1907). The action story takes place on the planar world of two-dimensional Astria on which the primary characters partake in pursuits of a scientific and romantic nature. Ultimately, some Astrians come to accept and comprehend the reality and fullness of three-dimensions in a world beyond their immediate comprehension. The book consists of a preface, an introduction, "The History of Astria", and the "episode" referred to in the title, composed of twenty short chapters. At 53,720 words, Hinton's work is longer than Edwin A. Abbott's earlier, and more famous, novella Flatland (1884).

Hinton's work combines various literary and scientific features, with the author intent on popularizing the idea of higher dimensions among educated Edwardian readers including such diverse groups as religious thinkers and believers, experimental scientists, artists, stodgy academics, engineers, politicians, and others of various persuasions and agendas. Recognizing the existence of, and even reaching, a higher dimension was not simply part and parcel to a strictly mathematical game; for Charles H. Hinton (1907), during an era when spiritualism (with the obligatory séances) was running rampant, it was important to point the way toward a higher realm of existence in both intellectual and genuinely spiritual terms.

== Influence ==
Hinton's advocacy of the tesseract as a means to perceive higher dimensions spawned a long lineage of science fiction, fantasy, and spiritual works that similarly refer to the tesseract as a way to understand—or even access—higher dimensions, including Charles Leadbeater's Clairvoyance (1899), Claude Bragdon's A Primer of Higher Space (1913), Algernon Blackwood's Victim of Higher Space (1914), H. P. Lovecraft's "The Shadow Out of Time" (1935), Robert Heinlein's ""—And He Built a Crooked House—"" (1941), Madeleine L'Engle's A Wrinkle in Time (1962), and Christopher Nolan's film Interstellar (2014).

Hinton was one of the many thinkers who circulated in Jorge Luis Borges's pantheon of writers. Hinton is mentioned in Borges' short stories "Tlön, Uqbar, Orbis Tertius", "There Are More Things" and "El milagro secreto" ("The Secret Miracle"):

He judged A Vindication of Eternity to be less unsatisfactory, perhaps. The first volume documents the diverse eternities that mankind has invented, from Parmenides' static Being to Hinton's modifiable past; the second denies (with Francis Bradley) that all the events of the universe constitute a temporal series.

Hinton influenced P. D. Ouspensky's thinking. Hinton’s works are mentioned in relation to many of the ideas Ouspensky presents in Tertium Organum. He also influenced the work of occultist Aleister Crowley, whose novel Moonchild mentions Hinton, though incorrectly by the name of his father, James Hinton.

John Dewey cited Hinton's concept of the Unlearner in Art as Experience, chapter 3. The story Unlearner appears in actually "An Unfinished Communication", part of the second series of "Scientific Romances". (Dewey mistakenly gives an incorrect name for the story.)

Spanish playwright Carlos Atanes wrote the comedy Un genio olvidado (Un rato en la vida de Charles Howard Hinton) ("A Forgotten Genius (A While in the Life of Charles Howard Hinton)"), a fictionalized play inspired by Hinton's life and centred on his stay in Yokohama in 1893. It premiered in Madrid at La Pensión de las Pulgas in July 2015.

== Works ==
- Hinton, Charles Howard (1976) [1884]. Scientific Romances: First and Second Series. introduction by James Webb. Arno Press. ISBN 0-405-07954-0. and 2nd series at Internet Archive
- A New Era of Thought, orig. 1888, reprinted 1900, by Swan Sonnenschein & Co. Ltd., London
- The Fourth Dimension, orig. 1904, 1912 by Ayer Co., Kessinger Press reprint, ISBN 0-405-07953-2, at Project Gutenberg, scanned version available online at the Internet Archive
- Speculations on the Fourth Dimension: Selected Writings of Charles H. Hinton, edited by Rudolf Rucker, 1980, Dover Publications, ISBN 0-486-23916-0 (includes selections from Scientific Romances, The Fourth Dimension, "The Recognition of the Fourth Dimension" from the 1902 Bulletin of the Philosophical Society of Washington, and excerpts from An Episode of Flatland)
- An Episode of Flatland or How a Plane Folk Discovered the Third Dimension orig 1907, Swan Sonnenschein & Co. Limd., uncut illustrated HTML version online at Forgotten Futures
- What is the Fourth Dimension? (1880)

== See also ==
- Hinton's honeycomb
- Hinton's polytope
- Spissitude
- Alicia Boole Stott
- Jungle gym
