= Fanshen =

1966 book by William Hinton on China

Fanshen: A Documentary of Revolution in a Chinese Village
- Author: William H. Hinton
- Language: English
- Publication date: 1966

Fanshen: A Documentary of Revolution in a Chinese Village is a 1966 book by William H. Hinton that describes the land-reform campaign during the Chinese Civil War conducted from 1945 to 1948 by the Chinese Communist Party in "Long Bow Village" (the name used in the book for the village of Zhangzhuangcun in Shanxi province). Hinton lived in the village in spring and summer of 1948 and witnessed scenes described in the book and recreates earlier events based on local records and interviews with participants. He explains party strategy to present the campaign's successes in building a revolutionary consciousness and a power base among the poor peasants, but also its errors and excesses, especially the violence toward rich peasants and landlords. Fanshen has been compared to Edgar Snow's Red Star Over China and characterized as "perhaps the book that most changed American cold war perceptions of the Chinese Revolution."

== Background ==
Hinton had first gone to China in 1937, then returned after the Second Sino-Japanese War in 1947 to work under the United Nations Relief and Rehabilitation Administration to spread agricultural technology. When lack of funding closed that program, he taught English at Northern University, a guerilla institution then in Lucheng county, in south Shanxi. Shortly after the New Year festival, in the spring of 1948, faculty and students left the school to join local cadres (party activists) to form work-teams that were sent by higher Party levels on special missions. Hinton joined the team sent to the village he called "Long Bow," some ten miles south of the city. He lived there until August, working in the fields and gathering material for the book that became Fanshen. After leaving Long Bow, Hinton stayed in China until 1953 as a teacher and tractor technician, an experience he described in his 1970 book, Iron Oxen: A Revolution in Chinese Farming. He left China in 1953, when his passport had expired, and returned to the United States by way of the Soviet Union and Europe. When United States customs officials confiscated more than 1,000 pages of manuscript for the book, Hinton sued for their release, but they were then taken by Senate Internal Security Committee headed by Senator James Eastland. The notes and papers were not returned until 1958.

=== Land reform ===
Hinton's stay in Long Bow in 1948 gave him an eye-witness view of one of many stages in the Party's village policies but his book presents dramatized scenes from earlier stages as well. He accompanied a work-team that was sent to inspect and control local implementation of the Outline Land Law, which the North China Bureau of the Party had promulgated on October 10, 1947, the anniversary of the 1911 Revolution. The Land Law left much up to local discretion. As one historian remarked, "This flexibility was in part the intended result of instructions from the Center – time and time again Mao underlined the need to bend one's specific policies after local conditions. But it also stemmed from differences in views among local cadres, orders that were misunderstood or misimplemented, successful local resistance, and the overall chaos of war."

These uncertainties reflected many years of unresolved debate and fluctuation. As early as 1927, Mao Zedong had seen land reform as the key to gaining support in the countryside and establishing Party control. Party leaders fought over such questions as the level of violence; whether to woo or target middle peasants, who farmed most of the land; or to redistribute all the land to poor peasants. During the Sino-Japanese War and the Second United Front, the Party emphasized Sun Yat-sen's moderate "land to the tiller" program, which limited rent to 37.5% of the harvest, rather than land redistribution. Unless they actively worked with the Nationalist government, which village elites seldom had reason to do, Party leaders did not want to alienate rich peasants and landlords, whose support was essential to the war effort.

In 1946 the outbreak of the Chinese Civil War changed the calculation. The Party decided to mobilize the vast majority of the village population while attacking the top 10%. In the spring of 1946, the Party Center issued a relatively moderate directive that the "land to the tiller" program be carried out through mass struggle against landowners, but protected the rights of middle peasants to own land and distinguished rich peasants from landlords. But on July 7, the Northeast Bureau, the Party office in charge of the campaign against Chiang's forces in Manchuria, ordered a radical strategy of targeting all landlords and rich peasants, and sent work teams to manage the process. The work teams worked hurriedly and with little investigation, leading to mistakes that cost the Party credibility and support. This was dangerous since many officers and common soldiers came from middle and rich peasant families.

The Outline Land Law of October 1947 mandated the elimination of land rent, which it termed "feudal exploitation", and the elimination of landlord status by implementing Sun Yat-sen's "land to the tiller" program. The most important provision called for equal land distribution. There was hot disagreement within the Party, however, and policy shifted several times. On the one hand, there were sometimes what the Party called "leftist deviations," such as expropriating all of the land from landlords, and on the other, "rightist policies," even corruption, such as giving special treatment to landlords in return for money or sexual favors.

Nonetheless, in the radical "Draft Land Reform Law" of October 10, 1947 the Party put the land reform movement into the hands of poor peasants in order to by-pass local party workers who were thought to be protecting village power-holders. Teams from one village were sent to attack the elites in neighboring villages in order to overcome ties of family and friendship. Reports of this violence undermined morale in the army and land confiscation damaged production in the countryside. By the summer of 1948, however, the movement had succeeded in its key goal, establishing the Party's control over grain and soybean markets, and was brought to an end.

== Case study ==
Hinton lived in Long Bow in the spring and summer of 1948 and gathered oral history and documentation to describe the three years of struggle before he arrived. As background he explains the extreme poverty of the area, which he stated made the landlord system especially cruel, and the wartime occupation by the Japanese army, which divided the village into those who collaborated and those who did not. He noted that the village was not typical. First, there was a sizable Catholic minority and many families had no ancestral roots in the region, which meant a weak clan structure. More important, Long Bow was one of the few villages occupied and fortified by the Japanese during the Second Sino-Japanese War. The village therefore did not experience the period of united resistance and moderate reform that characterized Mao's policies of New Democracy in the Base Areas of North China during the war. He wrote that the village had "leaped perforce from reactionary bastion to revolutionary storm center in the course of a few days." He wrote that the condensed time period, allowed him to see all stages of the movement for land reform that played out at great length in other villages.

Hinton's book discussed the violence that rocked Long Bow during land reform. In Hinton's view it was justified.

The book ends with a statement that the process of revolution did not end with the success of this campaign: "Land reform, by creating basic equality among rural producers, only presented the producers with a choice of roads: private enterprise on the land leading to capitalism, or collective enterprise on the land leading to socialism."

== Publishing ==
Hinton explained that in writing the book he "borrowed from the literary arsenal of the novelist, the journalist, the social scientist, and the historian. What I have produced, finally, seems to me to resemble, in spirit and in content, a documentary film. I call it, then, a documentary of revolution in a Chinese village." More important than simply giving land to the landless, Hinton argues, that Mao Zedong's aim was to create 'political awareness' among the poor peasants. He explains that the literal meaning of the term "fanshen" is "'to turn the body over, or 'to turn over'," that is, in revolutionary usage, to change your way of thought and join the revolution in a profound personal transformation. To "China's hundreds of millions of landless and land-poor peasants it meant to stand up, to throw off the landlord yoke, to gain land, stock, implements and houses." But it meant more than this: "It meant to throw off superstition and study science... That is why this book is called Fanshen."

The book was published first in hardcover by Monthly Review Press. However, they had agreed to publish the book only after it had been turned down by several other publishers, despite the political views being supportive. The paperback edition by Vintage Press sold more than 200,000 copies. Another paperback edition was published by University of California Press in 1997. Because of the success of the book, Hinton was welcomed back to China in the 1970s, when he visited Long Bow five times and wrote Shenfan (1983), a sequel to Fanshen that followed the village from the 1950s through the Cultural Revolution.

== Reception and influence ==
Within a few years of its publication, Fanshen became regarded as a classic and characterized by a noted China expert in Harvard Magazine as one of fifteen essential books on the country.

Benjamin I. Schwartz, a Harvard University specialist on Mao and his role in the revolution, wrote in the New York Times that Hinton's book is "extremely valuable but also highly problematic, as are all other sources on the history of the period." Schwartz continued, "As one who does not share in the slightest the author's faith that Mao has discovered the cure for human selfishness or for the exploitation of man by man, and as one who finds much of the high doctrine of the book simplistic, untrue, and often enormously trying, I would nevertheless insist that Mr. Hinton has made valuable and in some ways unique contributions to our understanding of life in a northern Chinese village on the eve of Communist takeover..."

The Columbia University anthropologist Morton H. Fried noted "one of the major problems the book poses, that is its reliability." Martin Bernal told readers of the New Statesman that Fanshen "gives details of the changing social and economic structure of his village... The descriptions alone make this book one of the two classics of the Chinese revolution, the other being Red Star over China," the 1937 book by Edgar Snow. William Jenner in Modern Asian Studies called it "one of the most profound and instructive books ever written by a Westerner about modern China..." Jenner wrote:

Mr. Hinton's support for land reform and his identification with the work team that was sent into the village to carry it out has not restricted him to singing their praises; his sympathy, being genuine, has enabled him to tell the story in all its details, even when gory. The mistakes, the unnecessary violence, the confusion caused by changes in policy. the tendency to go to extremes, and the crises in confidence all have their place in the story, thus making the achievements seem more real and more valuable.

Anthropologist Ann Anagnost wrote in 1994 that "perhaps the book that most changed American cold war perceptions of the Chinese Revolution."

== Later visits and sequels ==
Hinton returned to China in the 1970s to gather material for a follow-up volume that told the story of Longbow Village from the early 1950s to 1971, Shenfan: The Continuing Revolution in a Chinese Village (1980) A reviewer in The China Quarterly wrote that this volume "raises doubts as to whether it can be taken seriously as an accurate description and analysis". Hinton "views Long Bow," the review explains, "through the prism of the Cultural Revolution, because he is committed to Maoist values even while he recognized the negative side of the Maoist era, and because Hinton himself was an actor in Long Bow".

Hinton's daughter, Carma Hinton, made "The Longbow Trilogy," (1984) documentary films that show changes in Long Bow village in the 1980s: Small Happiness, concerning women's experience; "All Under Heaven," on religious practices; and To Taste 100 Herbs, on a Catholic doctor who practices herbal and Western medicine.

The playwright David Hare adapted the book for the stage in his 1975 play, Fanshen.
