= Carmelita Hinton =

American educator (1890–1983)

- Born: Carmelita Chase; April 20, 1890; Omaha, Nebraska, U.S.
- Died: January 16, 1983 (aged 92)
- Education: Bryn Mawr College
- Occupation: Educator
- Years active: c. 1910s–1955
- Spouse: Sebastian Hinton
- Children: 3, including William and Joan
- Relatives: Helena Modjeska Chase (sister)

Carmelita Hinton (née Chase, April 20, 1890 – January 16, 1983) was an American progressive educator. She is best known as the founder in 1935 of The Putney School, a progressive boarding school in Vermont.

== Early life ==
Born in Omaha, Nebraska, Hinton was one of four children. Her father, Clement Chase, owned a newspaper and a bookstore. He was a women's rights advocate and encouraged Hinton's energetic nature and belief that she could do what she wished with her life. Her mother, Lula Belle Edwards, disagreed and tried unsuccessfully to mold Hinton into a more traditional woman's role. During her years at the Omaha's Episcopal School for Girls, Hinton found herself bored with the traditional education and turned to various extra curricular activities including working as an assistant in her father's store and playing tennis. At Bryn Mawr College, where she trained as a teacher, Hinton deepened her love of reading and the type of education she had been seeking. She graduated in 1912, then moved to Chicago, where she lived at Hull House in 1913 as secretary to Jane Addams. At Hull House she enrolled in a two-year course on the playground, and soon after married Sebastian Hinton, a lawyer.

== Career ==
Shortly after the wedding, she opened a nursery school based in their house and a park nearby. The school's enrollment numbers doubled annually. Sebastian helped by inventing various bits of playground equipment, and is credited with patenting the first playground jungle gym. During the first six years of their marriage, the Hintons had three children, all of whom attended their mother's school. The family later moved to Winnetka, Illinois.

Having frequently struggled with depression, in 1923 Sebastian entered a clinic for treatment; while there he committed suicide. Hinton was stunned by the events, and according to Susan McIntosh Lloyd, told only her siblings and her best friend, Jane Arms, the truth about Sebastian's death. His own children did not know that it was suicide until a biographer accidentally revealed the fact to them. Hinton began teaching kindergarten at the North Shore Country Day School to keep herself busy. Feeling Winnetka was becoming a "society suburb", she moved her children to Cambridge, Massachusetts in 1925 and began teaching at the Shady Hill School. She later moved again to a farm in Weston, Massachusetts.

=== The Putney School ===
In 1934 a Hull House friend arranged the sale of Elm Lea Farm in Putney, Vermont for a reduced price for Hinton to found a school. There in 1935 she founded The Putney School, the first coeducational New England boarding school, an experiment in progressive education, and a working farm, which she was to direct until 1955. She based its structure on her belief in the value of manual labor, art and music, and scholarship as equally necessary components of a healthy adult life. At first it enrolled the children of wealthy progressives and liberals; and though all its students, staff, and faculty were heeded and treated as constituents by Hinton, she was the sole director of every aspect of the school.

The school's early success depended largely on her forceful personality; in the late 1940s and early 1950s, though, many of the school's teachers began to resent her complete authority over its running. Eventually Hinton was forced to compromise with a nascent teachers' union on matters of salary, conditions, and procedure. After 1955 she continued to attend the school's meetings, though she was officially retired, and travelled, led trips, founded other education projects and summer camps, and gave speeches.

== Personal life ==
Hinton had three children with Sebastian. Her daughter Jean Hinton Rosner (1917–2002) was a civil rights and peace activist. Her daughter Joan and her son William H. Hinton lived for decades in China before and after the revolution. William was a Marxist and sinologist. William's daughter and Carmelita's granddaughter Carma Hinton is a documentary filmmaker.
