= James Hinton (surgeon) =

English surgeon (1822–1875)

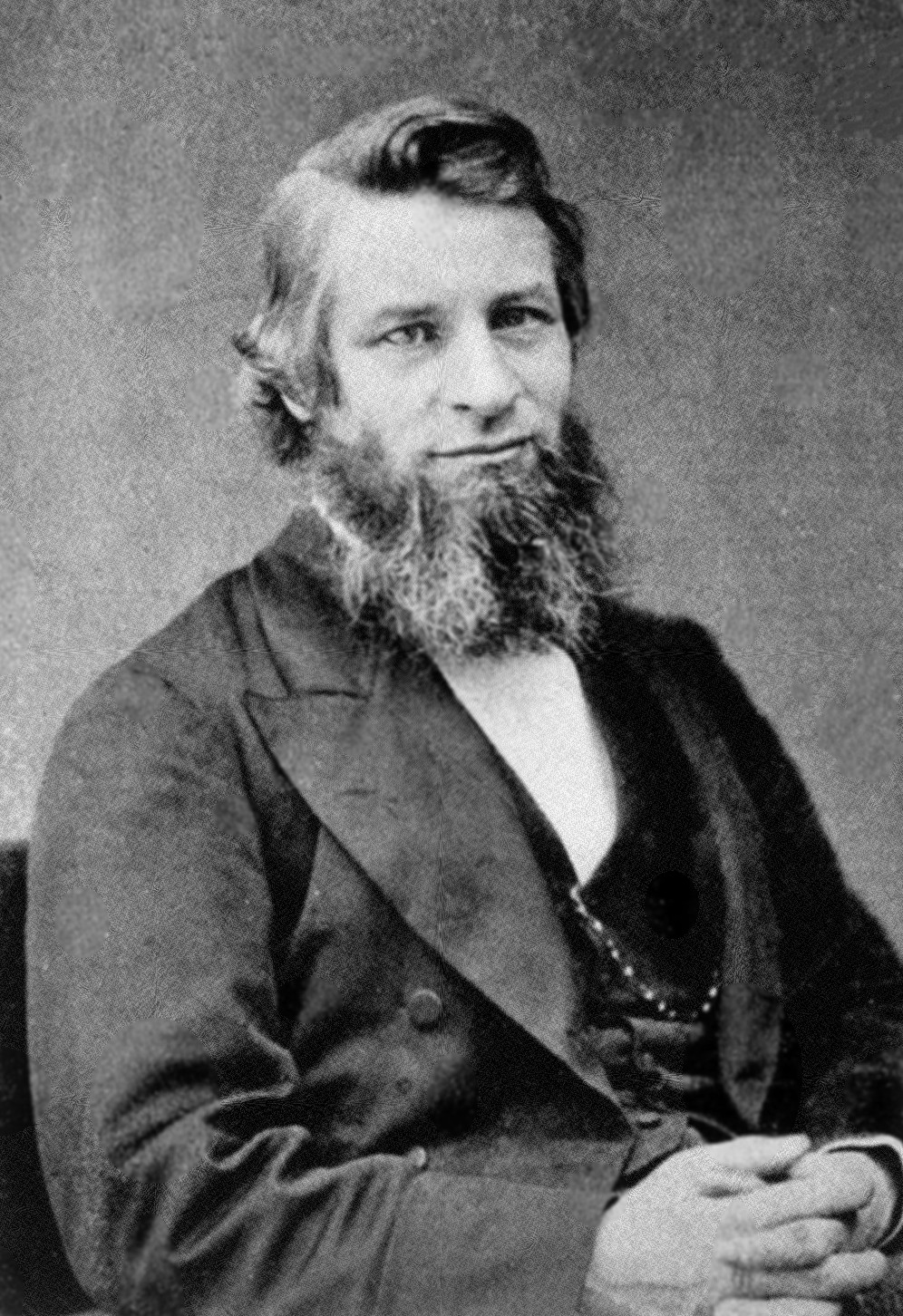
James Hinton

James Hinton (baptised 26 November 1822 – 16 December 1875) was an English surgeon and author. He was the father of mathematician Charles Howard Hinton. He was an outspoken advocate of polygamy. He appears as a character in some fictional accounts of the 19th-century English serial murderer known as Jack the Ripper.

== Life ==
He was born at Reading, Berkshire, the son of John Howard Hinton, Baptist minister, and author of the History and Topography of the United States and other works. James was educated at his grandfather's school near Oxford, and at the Nonconformist school at Harpenden, and in 1838, on his father's removal to London, was apprenticed to a woollen-draper in Whitechapel. After working there for about a year he became a clerk in an insurance office. His evenings were spent in intense study, and this, combined with a concentration on moral problems, so affected his health that, aged eighteen, he tried to seek refuge from his own thoughts by running away to sea. His intention having been discovered, he was sent, on the advice of his doctor, to St Bartholomew's Hospital to study for the medical profession. After receiving his diploma in 1847, he was for some time assistant surgeon at Newport, Essex, but the same year he went out to Sierra Leone to take medical charge of the free labourers on their voyage thence to Jamaica, where he stayed some time. He returned to England in 1850, and entered into partnership with a surgeon in London, where he soon had his interest awakened in aural surgery, and also studied physiology.

After being appointed aural surgeon to Guy's Hospital in 1863, he soon acquired a reputation as the most skillful aural surgeon of his day. In the 1870s his health began to break down, and in 1874 he gave up practice. He died the following year at the Azores of "acute inflammation of the brain," at age 53.

== Writings ==
His career as an author started in 1856 with papers on physiological and ethical subjects to the Christian Spectator; and in 1859 he published Man and his Dwellingplace, which deals with the relation of science to religion. It was re-issued in 2009 by Cambridge University Press.

A series of papers entitled "Physiological Riddles," in the Cornhill Magazine, afterwards published as Life in Nature (1862), as well as another series entitled Thoughts on Health (1871), proved his aptitude for exposition of popular science. His specialist field of surgery on the inner ear was the subject of An Atlas of the membrana tympani with descriptive text; being illustrations of diseases of the ear (1874), and Questions of Aural Surgery (1874). In addition to the works already mentioned, he was the author of The Mystery of Pain (1866) and The Place of the Physician (1874). On account of their fresh and vigorous discussion of many of the important moral and social problems of the times his writings had a wide circulation on both sides of the Atlantic.

He was also a radical advocate of polygamous relationships, and according to his wife, had once remarked to her: "Christ was the saviour of Men but I am the saviour of Women and I don't envy him a bit." The notoriety of his writings on polygamy led to accusations in polite society of actual immorality leading to a renunciation of them just before he died.

His Life and Letters, edited by Ellice Hopkins, with an introduction by Sir WW Gull, appeared in 1878 but overlooked references to polygamy. Some philosophical writings were published posthumously, edited by his wife Margaret and sister-in-law Caroline Haddon. The polygamous aspects led to a campaign to discredit him, fronted especially by a group of London radicals, The Men and Women's Club, founded in 1885 to discuss matters of gender and sexuality. Its success led to the discrediting too of his son, Charles Howard, whose bigamy was attributed to his father's theories. In 1887, Charles Howard and Mary Ellen Boole, the eldest daughter of George Boole and Mary Everest, exiled their family to Japan.

== Portrayal in fiction ==
Because of his association with Sir William Withey Gull, Hinton has been indirectly associated with the murders of Jack the Ripper.

In their fictional graphic novel on the Ripper, From Hell, authors Alan Moore and Eddie Campbell extend Hinton's concern over social problems to prostitution in Whitechapel, which became the hunting grounds for the Ripper after his death. Their suggestion is that his concerns over prostitution among the lower classes greatly influenced Gull, who was put forward as a Ripper suspect in Stephen Knight's 1976 book, Jack the Ripper: The Final Solution.

In From Hell, Hinton is portrayed as an idealistic doctor given to "passionate outbursts" and flights of metaphysical theorising and speculation. His character is used as a complementary figure to the more worldly – and less compassionate – Dr. Gull.

Hinton's association with the murders has much to do with both Knight's book and Iain Sinclair's novel White Chappell, Scarlet Tracings.
