= The Putney School =

School in Putney, Vermont

Coordinates: 42.9873°N 72.5540°W

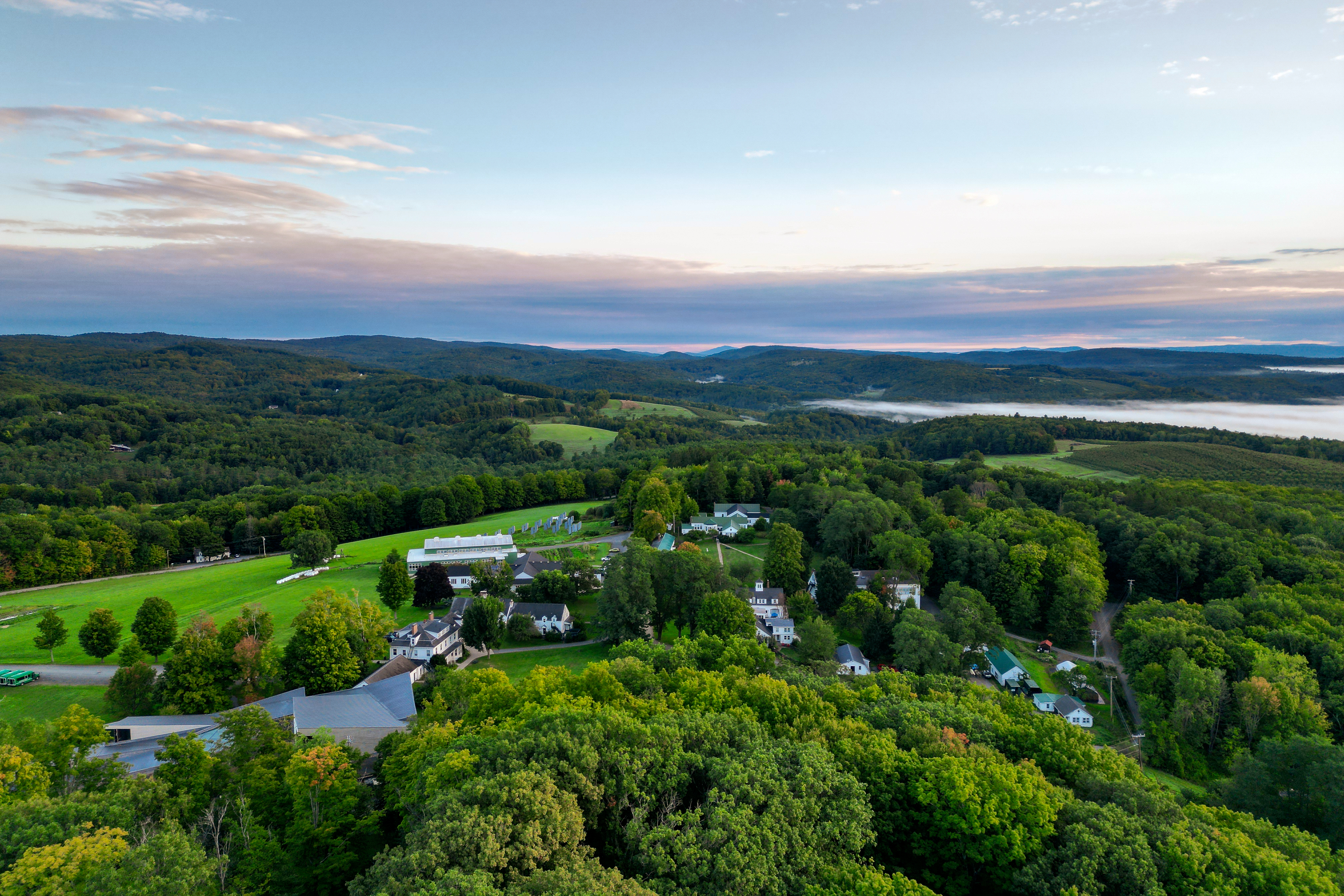
- 418 Houghton Brook Road, Putney, VT; U.S.

Information
- Type: Private independent co-educational boarding and day high school
- Established: 1935
- Founder: Carmelita Hinton
- Dean: Tarah Greenidge
- Head of School: Daniel O'Brien
- Faculty: 35 full-time, 24 part-time/adjunct
- Secondary years taught: 9th through 12th grades
- Enrollment: ca. 200
- Average class size: 12
- Student to teacher ratio: 6:1
- Classes offered: Humans in The Natural World, American Studies, Ceramics, Fiber Arts, Astronomy, Existentialism
- Campus size: 500 acres (200 ha)
- Campus type: Rural
- Colors: Green, White
- Athletics conference: River Valley Athletic League
- Mascot: Elm Tree
- Annual tuition: $74,500
- Website: http://www.putneyschool.org/

The Putney School is an independent high school in Putney, Vermont. The school was founded in 1935 by Carmelita Hinton on the principles of the Progressive education movement and the teachings of its principal exponent, John Dewey. It is a co-educational, college-preparatory boarding school, with a day-student component. Putney is 12 miles (19 km) outside Brattleboro, Vermont, on a 500-acre hilltop campus with classrooms, dormitories, and a dairy farm where students are expected to work. It enrolls about 200 students. Danny O'Brien is the head of school.

== Campus ==
Animated panorama from the center of the quadrangle on the Putney campus.

The original buildings on Putney's campus were overhauled or constructed by Putney work camp attendees, students, and faculty in 1935. The Currier Center is a departure from Putney's customary white, colonial-style architecture, instead using stone and concrete walls in an angular design. It is used for dance, music, movie-making and visual-art presentations. The Field House, which opened in October 2009, was designed as a "net zero-energy building".

There are ten active dormitories on campus. A few faculty members live in each.

== Academic program ==
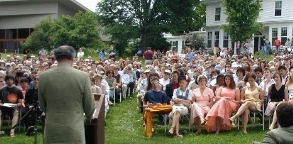
Then-Director Brian Morgan addresses the graduating Class of 2004.

In 1995, The Boston Globe described Putney as combining "a New England work ethic and a strong academic program." It is a member of the Independent Curriculum Group and in 2009 received a 10-year accreditation review by the New England Association of Schools and Colleges.

Of his time at the school in the 1950s, the essayist Eliot Weinberger said, "the kids were mainly the children of hardcore old lefties, classical musicians, folk singers, writers and academics."

== Farm work ==
According to Jean Strouse, Putney's farm is "more utopia than school" and seeks to teach "moral values through practical experience and hard physical work". Girls and boys work together on the farm.

== Tuition ==
Tuition for the 2023-24 academic year was $74,500 for boarding students and $45,400 for day students.
