= Erwin Engst =

American advisor

Erwin (Sid) Engst
- Born: 1918; U.S.
- Died: 2003 (aged 84–85)
- Other name: Chinese: 陽早
- Spouse: Joan Hinton (m. 1949, died 2010)

Erwin (Sid) Engst (1918–2003; Chinese: 阳早; pinyin: Yáng Zǎo) was an American advisor to the People's Republic of China.

== Education ==
Engst attended Cornell University from 1939 to 1941 majoring in agropastoral studies.

== Career ==
He moved to China in 1946 to assist in developments in agriculture and later to participate in the construction of that country's socialist economy. He married Joan Hinton in 1949 in Yan'an. They worked at a farm near Xi'an and moved to Beijing to work as translators and editors at the beginning of the Cultural Revolution in 1966.

On August 29, 1966, Hinton, Engst and two other Americans living in China signed a big-character poster with the following text:

"Which monsters and freaks are pulling the strings so foreigners get this kind of treatment? Foreigners working in China, no matter what class background they have, no matter what their attitude is toward the revolution, they all get the 'five nots and two haves': the five nots - first: no physical labour, second: no thought reform, third: no chances of contacts with workers and peasants, fourth: no participation in class struggle, fifth: no participation in production struggle; the two haves - first: they have an exceptionally high living standard, second: they have all kinds of specialisation. What kind of concept is that? This is Khrushchevism, this is revisionist thinking, this is class exploitation! [...] We demand: [...] Seventh: the same living standard and the same level of Chinese staff; eighth: no specialisation any more. Long live the Great Proletarian Cultural Revolution!"

News of the poster made its way to Mao Zedong, who approved of its contents, remarking in a September 8, 1966 letter to Lin Biao and other leaders that the Americans should indeed be treated equally.

In 1972, Hinton and Engst started working in agriculture again at the Beijing Red Star Commune.

In a 1996 interview with Andrea Koppel of CNN, after nearly 50 years in China, Hinton stated "[we] never intended to stay in China so long, but were too caught up to leave." Hinton describes the changes she and Engst had witnessed in China since the beginning of the economic reforms of Deng Xiaoping in the late 1970s. They state they "have watched their socialist dream fall apart" as much of China embraced capitalism. Koppel noted that "Once considered radical leftists by their native countrymen, Hinton and Engst are now too radical for most of China's countrymen."

== Personal ==
In 1949, Engst married Joan Hinton (1921 – 2010), a nuclear physicist, in Yan'an, Shaanxi Province, China. Engst had two sons, Bill and Fred Engst and a daughter, Karen Engst.

Following Engst's death in 2003, Hinton lived alone on a farm near Beijing until her death on June 8, 2010. Their three children have moved to the United States, though Hinton notes "They probably would have stayed if China were still socialist." Their eldest son, Yang Heping (Fred Engst), moved back to Beijing in 2007 as a professor at the University of International Business and Economics.

== Literature ==
Dao-yuan Chou: Silage Choppers & Snake Spirits. The Lives & Struggles of Two Americans in Modern China. Ibon Books, Quezon 2009, ISBN 971-0483-37-4.
