= Paetsch =

Paetsch is a surname. Notable people with the surname include:

- Günther Johannes Paetsch (1929–1997), cellist
- Hans Paetsch (1909–2002), German actor
- Jessica Rose Paetsch (born 1993), American pair skater
- Johann Sebastian Paetsch (born 1964), American cellist
- Julie Paetsch (born 1988), Canadian hockey and football player
- Michaela Paetsch (1961-2023), American violinist
- Nathan Paetsch (born 1983), Canadian ice hockey player
- Otto Paetsch (1909–1945), Standartenführer (Colonel) in the Waffen SS
- Priscilla Paetsch (1931-2017), American violinist and composer
- Matthew Paetsch (Born 1978), Popular American Bassist for Ecoustic Hookah
