= Johann Sebastian Paetsch =

American cellist and musician (born 1964)

- Paetsch and his cello
- Born: Johann Sebastian Paetsch; April 11, 1964; Colorado Springs, CO, U.S.
- Occupation: Concert cellist
- Spouse: Yoko Miyagawa Paetsch (m. 1994)
- Children: Raphaela Shauna Paetsch (b. 1996); Valentina Serena Paetsch (b. 1998); Dominic Günther Atsuki Paetsch (b. 2001)
- Parents: Günther Johannes Paetsch (father); Priscilla McClure Johnson Paetsch (mother)
- Relatives: Phebe Verena Paetsch (sister); Michaela Modjeska Paetsch (sister); Brigitte McClure Paetsch Gray (sister); Christian Friedeman Paetsch (brother); Engelbert Raphael Paetsch (brother); Siegmund Amadeus Paetsch (brother)
- Musical career
- Genres: Classical music
- Instrument: Cello: Matteo Goffriller 1730
- Years active: 1976–present

Johann Sebastian Paetsch (born in Colorado Springs, U.S. on April 11, 1964) is an American cellist and musician.

== Early musical education ==
Paetsch began his cello studies with his father, Günther Paetsch (who was also a cellist), at the age of 5, and gave his first recital when he was 6 years old. His extensive experience in chamber music began early in childhood with his large and talented family of 9. His three sisters Phebe, Michaela and Brigitte and his three brothers Christian, Engelbert and Siegmund all learned string instruments. He learned and performed almost the entire chamber music repertoire for strings with his family The Paetsch Chamber Music Ensemble in many concerts throughout the U.S.

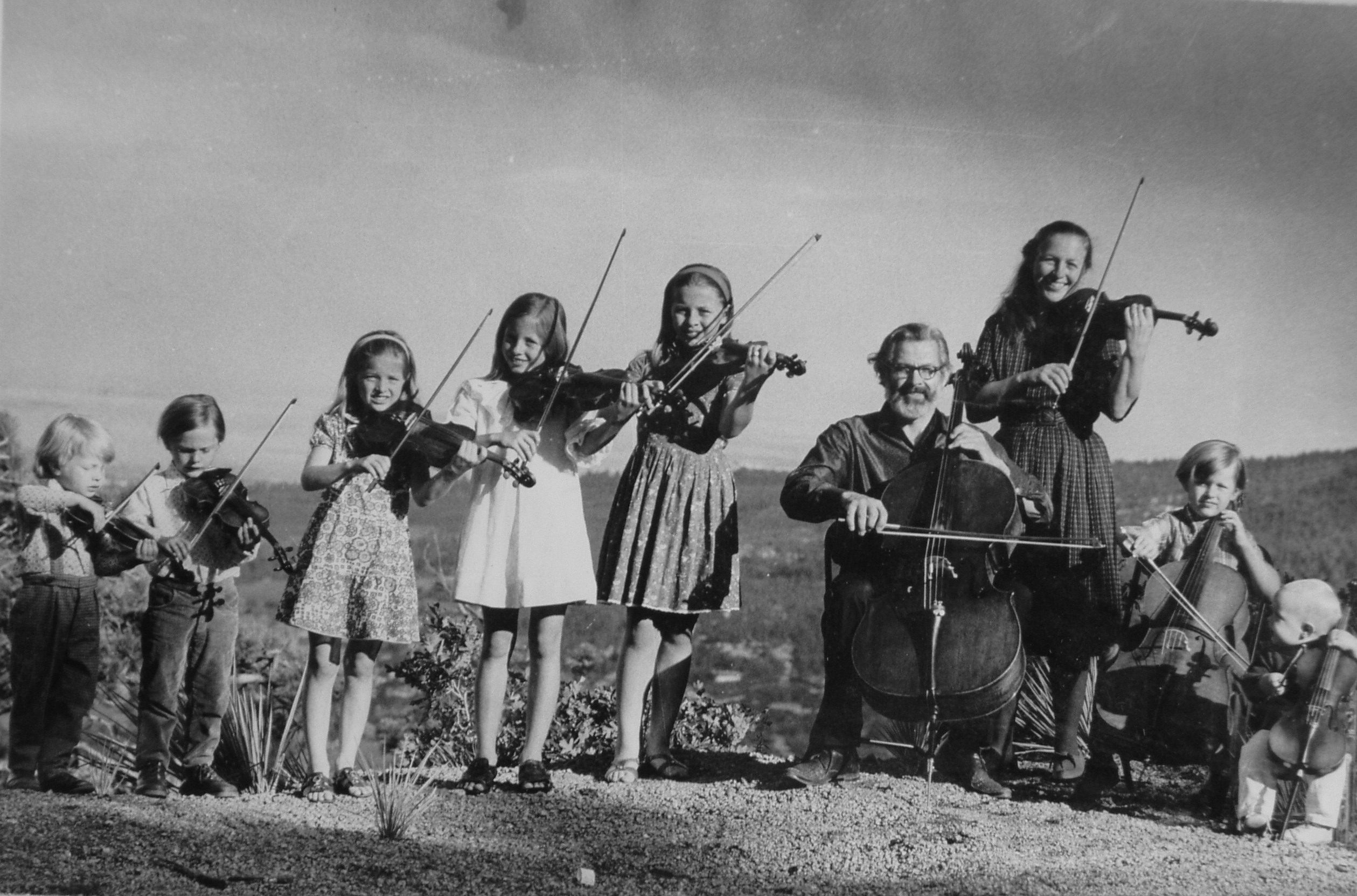
Paetsch family in Colorado Springs in 1973

== Formal musical education ==
Paetsch studied at Butler University with the principal cellist of the Indianapolis Symphony, Arkady Orlovsky, where he received his bachelor's degree Cum Laude. He then furthered his cello studies at Yale University in New Haven, Connecticut with the famous cellist and teacher Aldo Parisot, where he earned his Certificate of Music Degree and later his master's degree in Music. He then went on to study in Germany at the Musikhochschule Lübeck with David Geringas where he received his ‘Konzertexamen’. He has participated in masterclasses with cellists such as Yo-Yo Ma, Mstislav Rostropovich, Janos Starker, Bernard Greenhouse and Mischa Maisky. As a member of the Yale Cellists, he took part in the recording of two world-famous CDs.

== Awards and recognition ==
A recipient of numerous prizes, Paetsch was awarded a top prize in the Emmanuel Feuermann Competition and the first place in the Young Musicians Foundation Competition in Los Angeles, CA. He was also highly successful in the ARD Competition, Munich, in the prestigious Tchaikovsky Competition in Moscow and in the Rostropovitch Competition, held in Paris.

Paetsch has performed regularly in Japan, Europe and North and South America. He has collaborated with artists such as Vadim Repin, Gidon Kremer, Jean-Bernard Pommier, Eduard Brunner and the Wilanow Quartet.

== Life and career ==
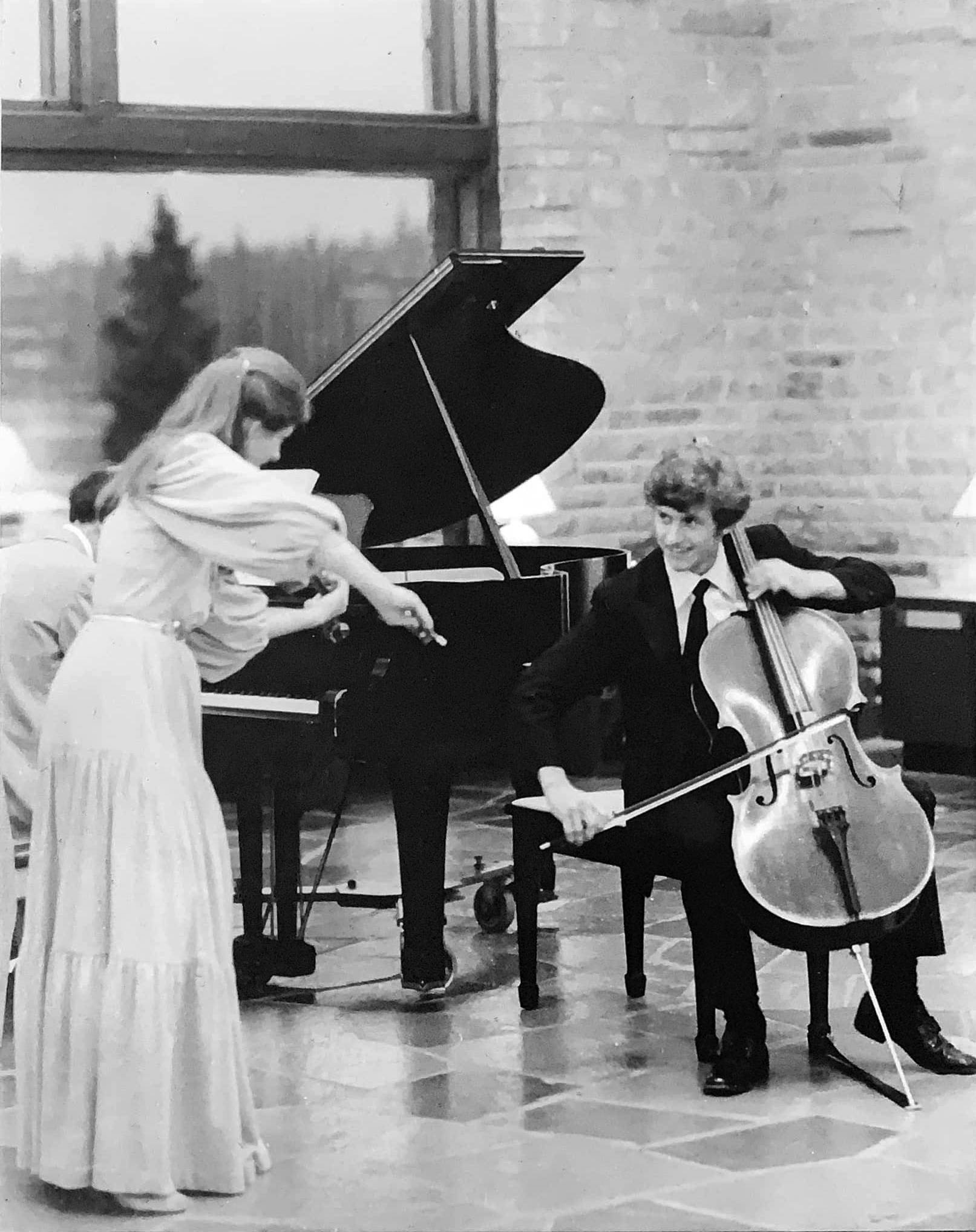
Sister and brother Michaela and Johann Paetsch preparing the Brahms Double Concerto.

As soloist, he has taken stage in many capitals of the world, performing concertos by Haydn, Dvořák, Shostakovich, Prokofiev, Schumann, Tchaikovsky and others. His performances and recordings of the Double Concerto (Brahms) in collaboration with sister and violinist Michaela Paetsch, have taken place in the US, Canada, Switzerland and in Germany. He has been featured soloist with the Orchestra della Svizzera Italiana in performances and recordings of great pieces such as Boccherini, Camille Saint-Saëns, Kabalevsky and the two Haydn Concertos, as well as Don Quixote (Strauss) with conductor Alain Lombard.

At Yale University Paetsch met his future wife: violinist Yoko Miyagawa and they married in Lugano, Switzerland in 1994, who is daughter of Tadatoshi Miyagawa, and fifth cousin of the predecessor Emperor of Japan, Akihito. Paetsch's first daughter Raphaela, born in Lugano in 1996, also plays the cello. His daughter Valentina, born in 1998 plays the violin and his son Dominic plays the cello. Raphaela, Valentina and Dominic have performed string quintets in public with their father and mother.

Since 1992 Paetsch has served as First Solo Cellist of the Orchestra della Svizzera Italiana in Lugano, Switzerland. He also was founder of a piano trio called the Trio Ceresio, which has performed in Europe, Japan as well as Brazil.

== Critical reception ==
Paetsch's work has been well received by a music critics worldwide. A writer from the Lübecker Nachrichten wrote "...a brilliant virtuoso piece which demanded all the finesse of everything that one could imagine from a cellist, delighted the audience and brought them to a thundering applause." A review in The Strad magazine applauded his cellistic abilities, saying he was "A CELLIST of extraordinary flair...His playing is at once stylish and communicative and of virtuoso stamp." In addition, a music critic from The New Haven Register wrote that "Paetsch brought great intensity and depth of understanding to this complex work.... the second movement was exquisitely eerie. His multiple-stop work stood out both for its lyrical beauty and technical excellence."

== Compositions and transcriptions ==
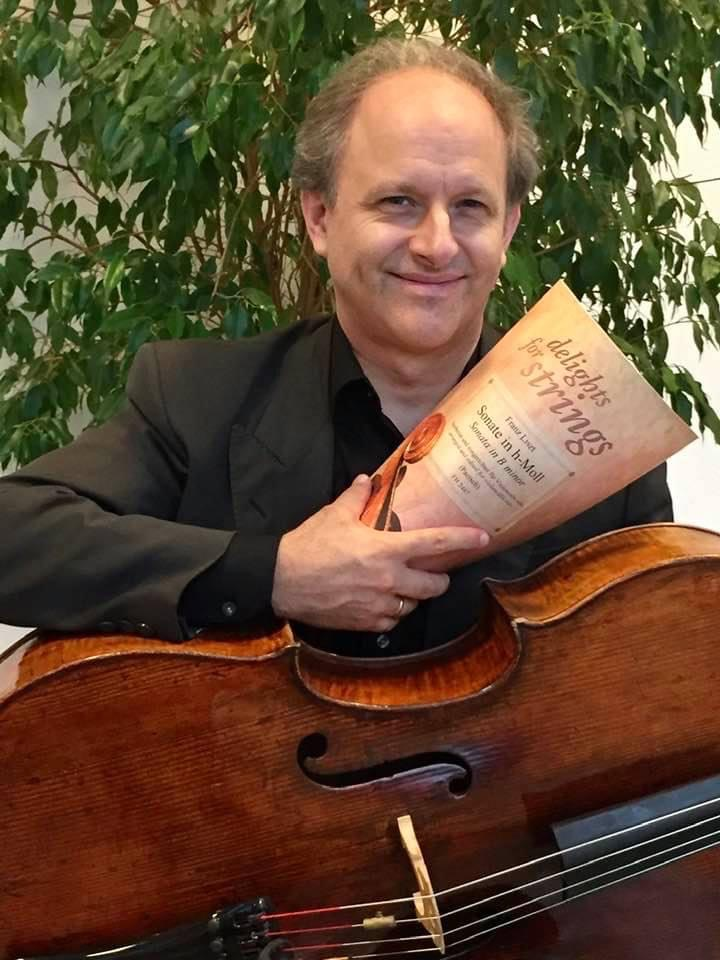
Johann Sebastian Paetsch holding his published transcription of the Liszt Sonata for Solo Cello and his cello

Paetsch is also a noted champion of works transcribed for solo cello. In 2013 Paetsch transcribed Franz Liszt's Piano Sonata in B minor, S.178, for solo cello. In 2015, he transcribed "3 Pieces from BWV 565, 903, and 1004" by Johann Sebastian Bach for solo cello. This include the Toccata and Fugue BWV 565, the Chromatic Fantasia BWV 903 and the Chaconne from Partita No. 2 BWV 1004.

== Ancestry ==
The pioneer background of Johann Paetsch and the family on Priscilla's side extends back to the Mayflower as five ancestors including Governor William Bradford, John Howland and Elizabeth Tilley came over to the New World on the English ship by that name in 1620 and the Paetsch children are direct descendants of several Mayflower Pilgrims. His family had been in North America for many generations. In fact, Johann Sebastian Paetsch is a direct descendant of Mayflower passenger Governor William Bradford, who is his 9th great-grandfather. Five generations of this family have been connected with Colorado Springs.

Ancestors of Johann Sebastian Paetsch

8. Bruno Henri Paetsch (1867–1948)
4. Heinrich Karl Willy Paetsch (1892–1970)
9. Magdalene Anna Salome Göbel (1869–1918)
2. Günther Johannes Paetsch (1929–1997)
10. Friedrich Matt (1858–1940)
5. Helene Marie Matt (1889–1942)
11. Karoline Luise Pauline Dieterle (1851–1926)
1. Johann Sebastian Paetsch (born 1964)
12. Albert Tilford Johnson (1851–1916)
6. Harry McClure Johnson (1886–1932)
13. Elizabeth Breading McIlvaine (1858–1950)
3. Priscilla McClure Johnson (1931–2017)
14. Champion Clement Chase (1860–1922)
7. Helena Modjeska Chase (1900–1986)
15. Lula Belle Edwards (1865–1950)
