= Grace Presbyterian Church =

Grace Presbyterian Church may refer to:

- Grace Presbyterian Church of New Zealand
- Grace Presbyterian Church (Peoria, Illinois)
- Local congregations in various Presbyterian churches
