= Eric Le Van =

American classical pianist (born 1964)

Eric Le Van (born June 14, 1964) is an American classical pianist particularly known for his interpretations of the music of Brahms and Scriabin. He is also an archivist of unusual repertoire. He has been guest soloist and recitalist in major festivals and venues in the United States and in Europe, notably the Weimar Franz Liszt Festival and the Beethovenfest in Bonn, the Fetes Romantiques de Nohant Festival in France, as well as the Kennedy Center and the Library of Congress in Washington D.C.

Early on he entered the class of Earle C. Voorhies, whose own professor was Alexander Siloti, one of Liszt's pupils, and a cousin and teacher of Rachmaninov. After graduating from the University of Southern California, he moved to Europe in 1986 where he became a protege of Rudolf Buchbinder at the Musik-Akademie in Basel, Switzerland. In Basel, he studied chamber music with Walter Levin, founder and first violinist of the LaSalle Quartet, and pianist Gérard Wyss. Later, he was a Fulbright scholar in the class of Karl-Heinz Kammerling at the Hochschule für Musik in Hannover, Germany, and pursued doctoral studies at La Sorbonne in Paris.

In chamber music, his partners include Michaela Paetsch, and Axel Strauss.

He was artistic director of the Franz Liszt Festival in Alsace, France from 1997 to 2003. He now lives in the Los Angeles area with his family.

== Reception ==
Le Van's recordings have been praised for their sensitivity, emotional depth, and power.

His debut CD of Brahms' Sonatas no.1 & no.3 for Gallo Records immediately drew positive reviews. Jacques Bonnaure in Repertoire stated that he is one of the most important Brahms interpreters since Julius Katchen, and compared Le Van to Curzon and Arrau. Le Monde de la musique praised Le Van's "lyrical generosity and expressive sincerity." The Revue Musicale de Suisse Romande wrote of him as "an artist of the highest caliber." The BBC Music Magazine described his performances as "powerfully impressive". Bernard Jacobson in Fanfare Magazine elaborates on his "profound understanding" and his "sovereign technical facility".

Le Van's survey of Liszt's chamber music, with cellist Guido Schiefen for Arte Nova (BMG), earned them the Neue Musik Zeitung's award "Critic Choice" for Best Chamber Music Disc of the Year in 2000. Adrian Corleonis in Fanfare qualified the performers' contribution to the Liszt discography as "significant", and lauded their "consummate artistry and hand-in-glove collaboration." Donald Vroon in The American Record Guide expressed that "Le Van here is better than any pianist on any chamber recording of these pieces."

As for the premiere of Raff's works for piano and violin on Tudor Records, the Joachim Raff Society published an online review stating that: "if you plan to buy only one Raff recording this year, then this is the one." On Classical Net, Donald Satz extensively reviewed the CD, concluding: "This is one of the most enjoyable recordings I have listened to in the past few years. Great music does not play itself; it needs exceptional performers to highlight its architecture and the compelling nature of its musical lines and progression. Neftel and Le Van have done this with a level of artistry and technique that is stunning. I give the recording a 10/10; the Satz Rating Scale shows the disc to be off the charts."

Likewise, his readings of the complete Scriabin Mazurkas for Music & Arts were described by Bryce Morrison in Gramophone as "magically fleet and affectionate," "youthful, ardent and communicative." The BBC Music Magazine gave it 4 stars, with Matthew Rye praising the "freshness and lustre of his tone—captured in one of the most natural piano recordings I have heard for some time." Fanfare Magazine, citing "artistry of the highest order", described Mr. Le Van as " uncannily sensitive to Scriabin's nuances of phrase and harmonic subtleties," and Peter J. Rabinowitz selected the recording for the Want List 2004 of indispensable new recordings to have: "Eric Le Van plays with a rhythmic flexibility that few other living pianists could carry off. It's what you might call a polemical disc—certainly, it offers an extreme and distinctive interpretive perspective. But Le Van expresses his position in a way that's convincing, even mesmerizing." In an in-depth review on the website MusicWeb International, critic Donald Satz concluded: "it is not an easy task to be competitive with the greatest Scriabin pianists of the past as Vladimir Sofronitsky, Samuel Feinberg, Sviatoslav Richter, Roberto Szidon, Vladimir Horowitz, and Scriabin himself. Le Van deserves to be placed in this exalted company, and he enjoys the best sonics that modern techniques can offer."

Of second Brahms CD, the American Record Guide commented: "it is exhilarating to hear Brahms playing that feels so alive." L'éducation musicale hailed Le Van as "a worldwide Brahms authority."

Le Van's recording "Exil. Piano Music by Composers with Roots in Two Continents" was released in 2013 with Music & Arts. It features the works – including world premieres – of five Jewish composers who were amongst the wave of intellectuals and artists who left Europe in the 1930s for the United States: Erich Wolfgang Korngold, Erich Zeisl, Ernst Toch, Arnold Schoenberg, and Mario Castelnuovo-Tedesco. These emigres, fleeing the upsurge of European fascism, contributed to make Southern California one of the capitals of world culture, and profoundly altered the horizons of American music and the arts. Zeisl biographer Malcolm Cole heralds these composers' works as "magnificently served" in Le Van's own readings, and Barbara Zeisl Schoenberg, daughter of Erich Zeisl and daughter-in-law of Arnold Schoenberg, endorses the CD as "deeply moving and thrilling": "Le Van played my father's pieces with so much emotion and beauty. I have listened to all the pieces on the CD and he plays them all wonderfully, including the Schoenberg which I have heard many times: he renders them so lyrically which makes them sound, though modern, so romantic and beautiful!" The New York Times' chief music critic Anthony Tommasini has praised the CD as "a fascinating new recording.". Le Van's recording was featured on HBDirect's magazine, and was also recommended on Expedition Audio. He has given several interviews on this release, including for Pizzicato magazine.

== Discography ==
- Brahms: Sonatas No.1 & 3. Eric Le Van (piano). Label: Gallo CD-946
- Liszt: Complete Works for Cello and Piano. Guido Schiefen (cello); Eric Le Van (piano). Label: BMG-Arte Nova 74321 76809 2/ Oehms Classics OC 246
- Raff: Sonatillen for violin and piano Op.99 & 6 Morceaux for violin and piano Op. 85. Michaela Paetsch Neftel (violin); Eric Le Van (piano). Label: Tudor 7109
- Scriabin: Complete Mazurkas. Eric Le Van (piano). Label: Music & Arts CD-1125
- Brahms: Sonata No 2, Scherzo Op. 4, Ballades Op. 10. Eric Le Van (piano). Label: Gallo CD-1203
- Exil. Piano Music by Composers with Roots in Two Continents. Eric Le Van (piano), Label: Music & Arts CD-1271
