= Helena Modjeska Chase =

American artist and writer (1900–1986)

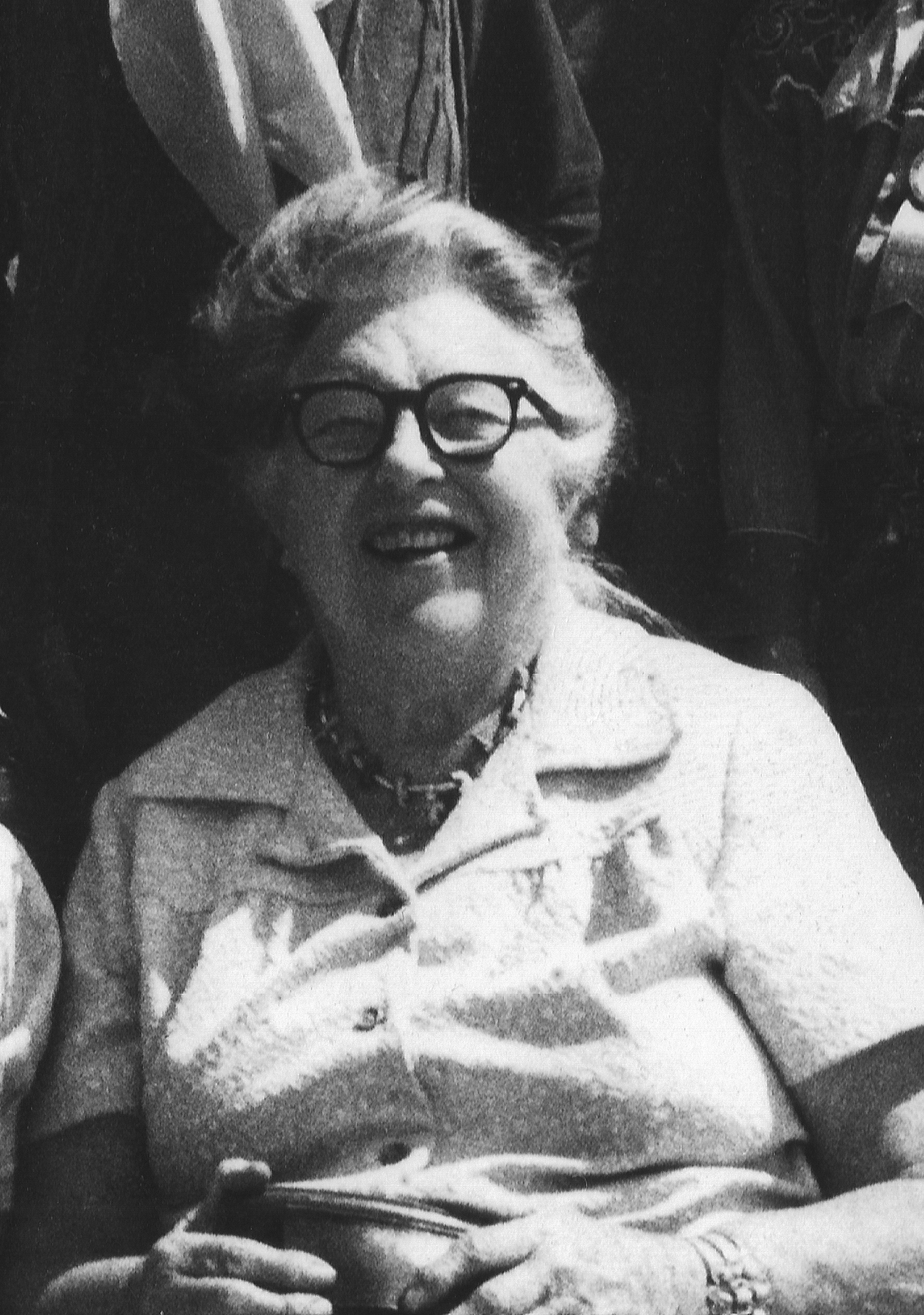
- Drea, c. 1975
- Born: Helena Modjeska Chase; September 23, 1900; Omaha, Nebraska, U.S.
- Died: December 22, 1986; Santa Fe, New Mexico, U.S.
- Education: New York School of Fine and Applied Arts; Putney Graduate School of Teacher Education (MEd)
- Occupations: Artist; writer; equestrian
- Spouses: Harry McClure Johnson (m. 1923; died 1932) William Francis Drea (m. 1965)
- Children: 5, including Priscilla McClure Johnson
- Relatives: Carmelita Hinton (sister)

Helena Modjeska Chase Johnson Drea (born Helena Modjeska Chase; September 23, 1900 – December 22, 1986) was an American artist, writer, and equestrian.

== Early life and education ==
Drea was born in Omaha, Nebraska on September 23, 1900.

Her father, Clement Chase, was a publisher and editor of The Excelsior newspaper in Omaha and bookstore owner. Her mother, Lula Belle Edwards Chase, came from a socialite background and allegedly had ancestors who arrived on the Mayflower. Drea was the fourth and youngest child. She was named after her godmother, Polish actress Helena Modjeska. The Chase family often hosted gatherings, attracting artists, writers, actors, and dancers to their home in Omaha. Drea's grandfather, Colonel Champion Spaulding Chase, served as the mayor of Omaha.

Drea attended Brownell Hall, an Episcopal church school for women. During the summers of 1913 and 1914, she also studied at the Art Institute of Chicago. Her mother was an artist as well whom also studied at the Art Institute of Chicago. Her mother's watercolor work and Drea's statuette called "Day Dreams" were often exhibited together.

Drea studied at the Latin school in Chicago and took art and dancing lessons at the Chamber's Academy Ballroom. While attending the Mary C. Wheeler School in Providence, Rhode Island, she was elected one of the editors of the school magazine, the Quill.

In 1916, Drea designed a poster for a fundraising effort to support Unit No.1 of the American Fund for French Wounded Civilian Relief. Her poster was selected for exhibition in New York and later displayed at the Corcoran Gallery of Art in Washington, D.C.

Drea graduated from the New York School of Fine and Applied Arts in 1923.

Later in life, after raising her five children, Helena joined the Putney Graduate School of Teacher Education's "World Study Trip" and earned a Master of Education degree in 1958. During her travels in 1956–1957, she visited 38 countries.

== Career and other ventures ==
Drea taught art at the Art Department at Putney School and Hickory Ridge School in Vermont. She also served as the head of the Art Department at Perry-Mansfield Camp in Steamboat Springs, Colorado.

=== Real Estate ===
In 1939, Drea bought a hotel in La Jolla, San Diego and named it "La Posada." Today the hotel is known as the Grande Colonial Hotel. She owned and operated the hotel for over 25 years. The hotel, featuring seven small rooms, earned the distinction of being the "Smallest hotel in the World with an Elevator" due to its six-person solid mahogany wood elevator. Helena and her five children celebrated the grand opening of the hotel in 1940, with their two Shetland ponies, Peanuts and Pardner, serving as official greeters.

=== Equestrianism ===
Drea had a passion for horses and began her herd through a wild horse roundup in the Sand Wash Basin in Colorado. She brought back a wild filly that produced palomino offspring.

At some point, she sold Shetland ponies to Hannes Von Trapp, the youngest son of the Trapp family singers.

She also raised Polish-bred registered Arabian Horses. She also bred Shetland ponies and wild Mustangs from Douglas Mountain, Colorado.

=== Writing ===
Drea published author of children's books, poems, and a children's magazine "Adventure Trails." In December 1962, her poems were printed in the Poetry Fellowship of Colorado Springs' fifth annual anthology "Skylines." In addition to the fellowship, Drea was also a member of the Penn Women of Colorado and the Quill Club of Colorado Springs. She won Honorable Mention in the Nellie Budget Miller Poetry contest in 1969. Her poems were also published in the Colorado Springs Gazette-Telegraph.

In 1945, Drea established "Adventure Trails Publications" at her ranch in Steamboat Springs. Her daughters Elizabeth and Priscilla wrote and published books under this venture, including "The Vengeance of the Vixen" and "How the Eggplant Came to Be." Helena also published books under the pseudonym Charity Chase.

=== Music ===
Drea served on the board of the Colorado Springs Chorale. She played the piano, viola, banjo, drums, and cello. Drea was also involved in the Putney Symphony Orchestra.

=== Painting ===
Drea's paintings have been exhibited across the US. She also contributed three oil portraits to the 1944 annual exhibit of the Denver Art Museum.

In August 1949, doll portraits painted by Drea were displayed in the children's department of the Denver Public Library. These portraits included an old kid-bodied wax doll and portraits of twin dolls from Brattleboro, Vermont, and a doll in a pioneer costume. Drea's paintings have been used to illustrate printed stories.

Drea hosted her own solo art shows, showcasing her portraits and still life studies.

== Personal life and death ==
In 1923, Drea married trademark attorney Harry McClure Johnson. The couple settled in Winnetka, Illinois. The couple had five children together. In March 1932, Johnson, died at the age of 46.

After his death, Drea and their children to Steamboat Springs, Colorado where she purchased a Pine Springs Ranch horse ranch.

In 1965, she remarried to physician Dr. William Francis Drea at Grace Episcopal Church in Colorado Springs. Drea's was given in marriage by her son-in-law, Gunther Paetsch.

Drea's sister, Carmelita Hinton, founded The Putney School in Putney, Vermont.

Drea died at the age of 86 on December 22, 1986, in Santa Fe, New Mexico. Dr. Harry McClure Johnson a scientist in Maryland and Washington, D.C., She left behind five surviving children from her first marriage and 2 grandchildren.
