= Michaela Paetsch =

American musician (1961 – 2023)

Michaela Paetsch Neftel
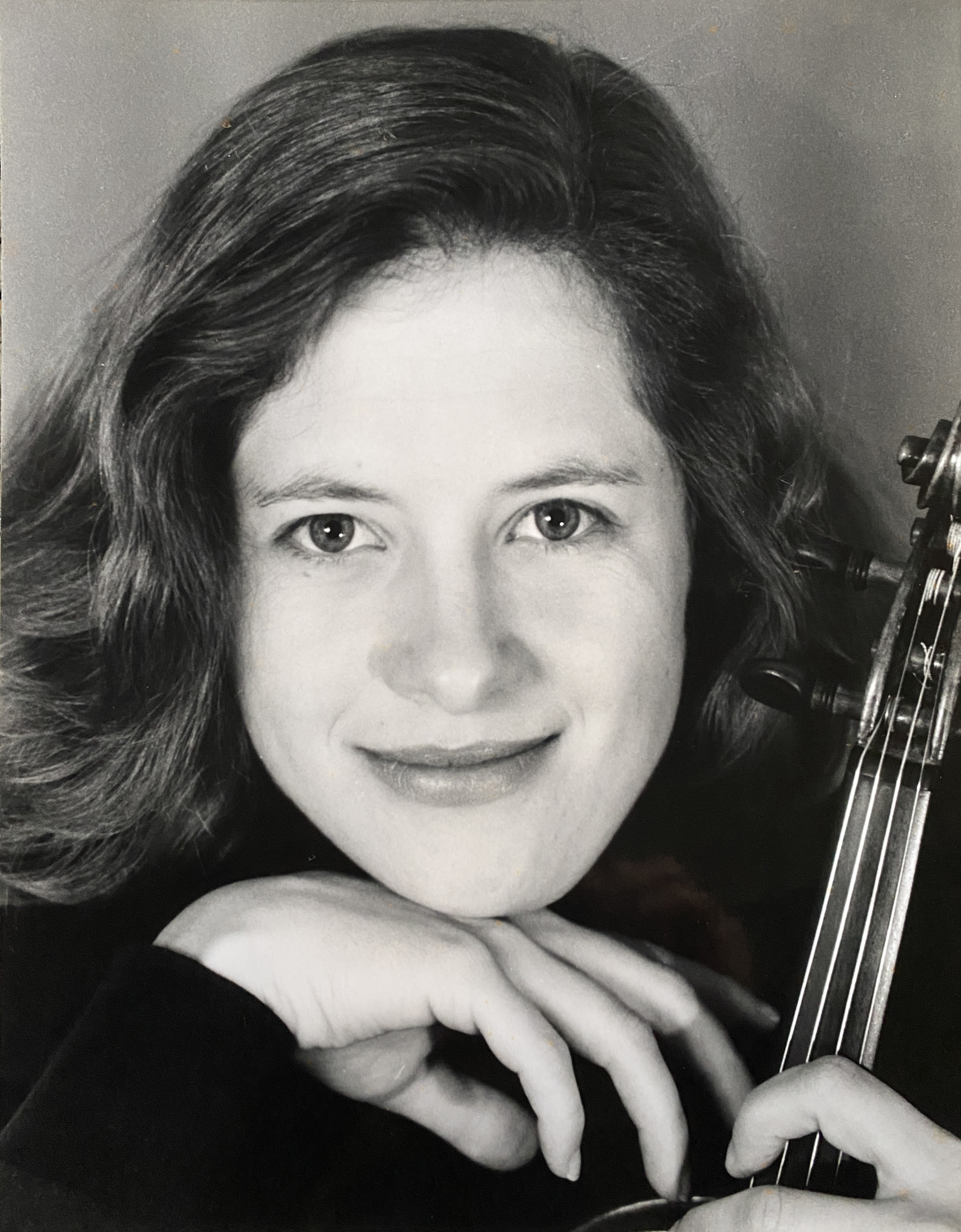
- Michaela Paetsch Neftel with her violin
- Born: Michaela Modjeska Paetsch; November 12, 1961; Colorado Springs, Colorado, U.S.
- Died: January 20, 2023 (aged 61); Bern, Switzerland
- Occupation: Concert violinist
- Years active: 1971–2023
- Spouse: Klaus Neftel (m. 1990)
- Children: 1
- Parents: Günther Johannes Paetsch (father); Priscilla Paetsch (mother)
- Relatives: Johann Sebastian Paetsch (brother)

Michaela Paetsch Neftel (November 12, 1964 - January 20, 2023), also known as Michaela Modjeska Paetsch, was an American violinist.

== Early life ==
Paetsch was born on November 12, 1961, in Colorado Springs, Colorado, to cellist Günther Johannes Paetsch and violinist Priscilla Paetsch, both of whom played in the noted Colorado Springs Symphony.

When Paetsch was 12 years old, she won both the Colorado Springs Young Artists Contest and the Pueblo Young Artists Contest. She subsequently performed as a soloist with the Colorado Springs Symphony, the Pueblo Symphony under the direction of Gerhard Track and the Jefferson Symphony in Denver, Colorado.

At the age of 14, Paetsch was the youngest full-time member of the Colorado Springs Symphony, which she did while attending Cheyenne Mountain High School. At 16 years old, she won first prize in the National String Competition held in Chicago, Illinois.

== Career ==
=== 1970s ===
In 1972, Paetsch became the concertmaster of the Cosmic Heights Chamber Orchestra and played as a first violinist and soloist with the Baroque Players. The Paetsch String Sextet, a family group formed in 1972, consisted of Michaela as concertmaster and solo violist; Priscilla Paetsch as both violinist and violist; Günther Johannes Paetsch as the principal cellist; Brigitte and Phebe Paetsch performing the tutti voices and solo inner violin and viola parts, and Johann Sebastian Paetsch as the continuo cellist, a chordal instrument considered part of the basso continuo part.

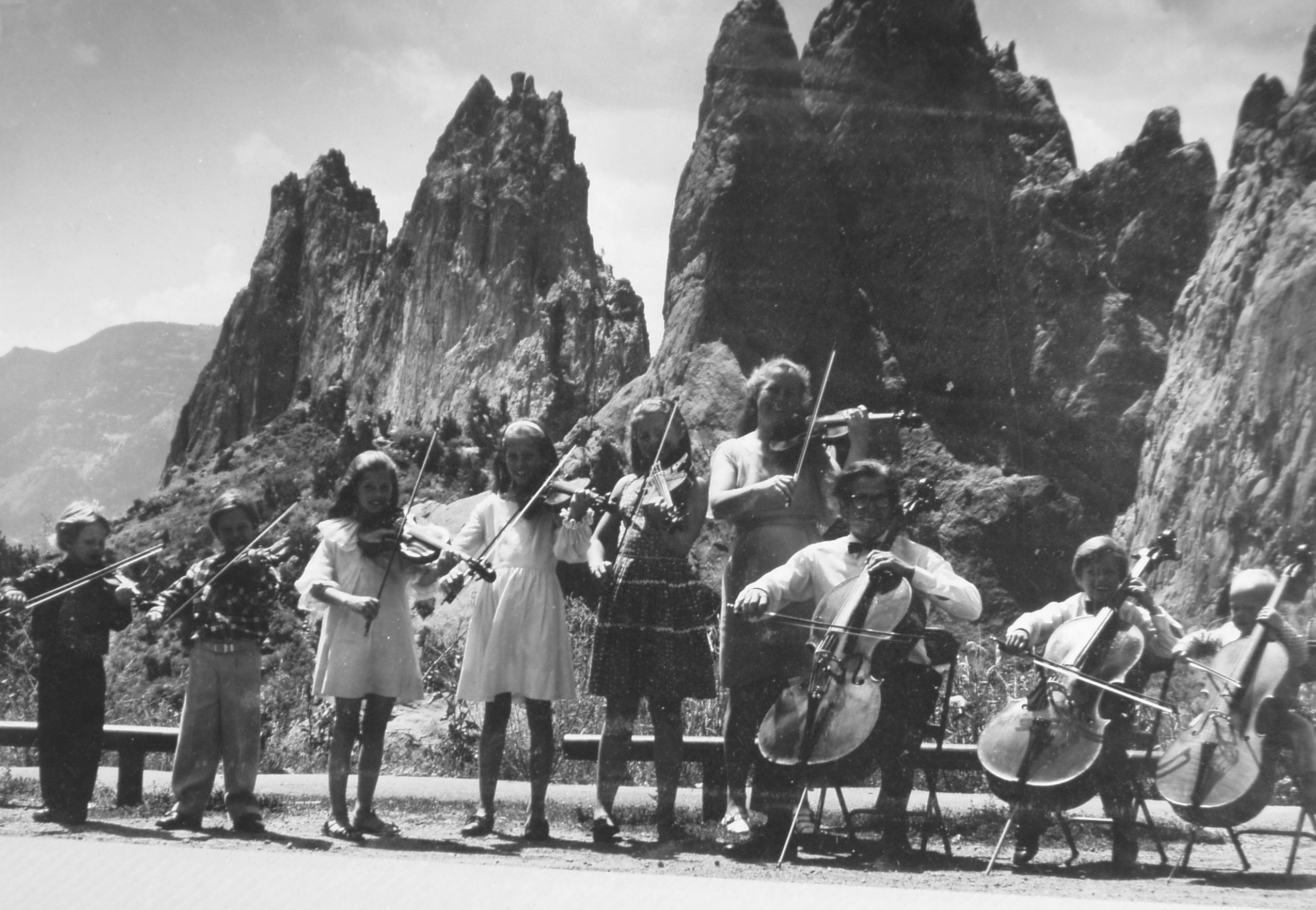
Paetsch Family Chamber Music Ensemble in 1973

In 1979, Paetsch performed Dvořák's Violin Concerto with Myung-Whun Chung conducting the Debut Orchestra of Young Musicians Foundation in the Wilshire Ebell Theater in Los Angeles, California.

=== 1980s ===
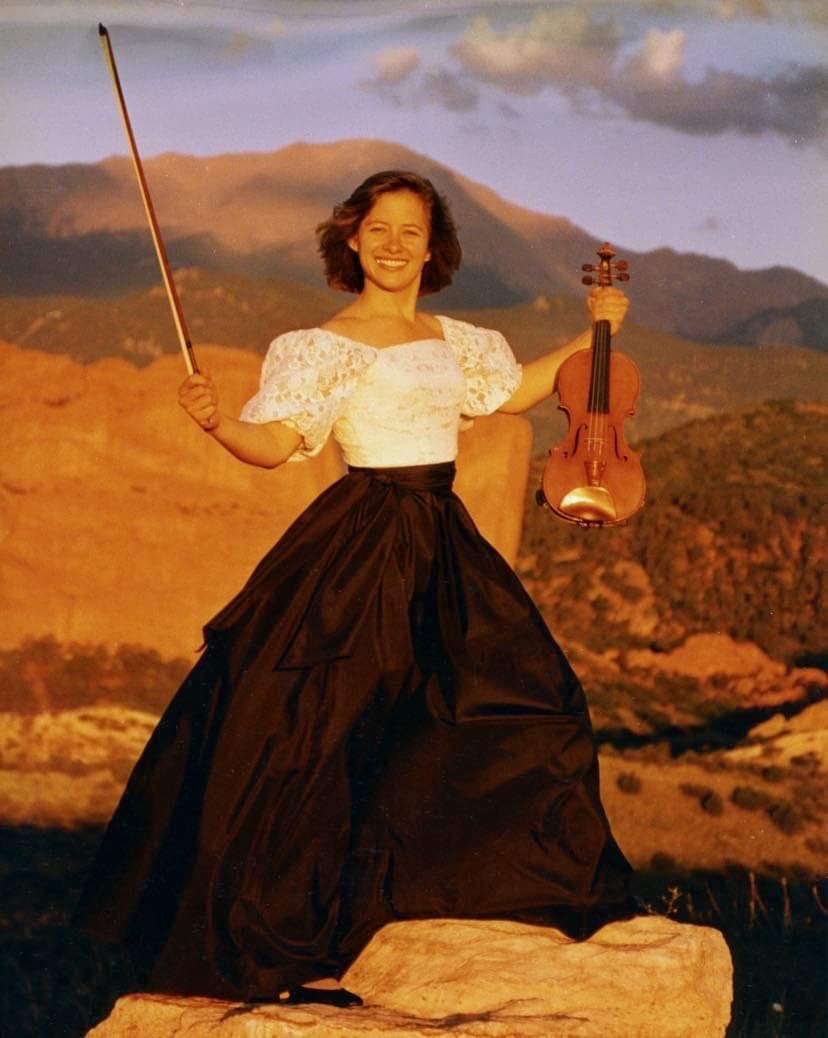
Paetsch at the Garden of the Gods, Colorado in 1980

Paetsch went to study at Yale University with the Polish-born violinist Szymon Goldberg, who also taught Paetsch’s mother, Priscilla. Paetsch followed Goldberg to the Curtis Institute of Music in Philadelphia, where he continued teaching after leaving Yale due to its mandatory retirement age. In one of her recitals at the Curtis Institute, she performed solo works by Bach, Paganini, and Bartòk, and premiered Daron Aric Hagen's “Occasional Notes” and William Coble's “Intrada”.

On 4 July 1986, Paetsch was awarded a special prize for the best performance of a compulsory work by Russian composer Yuri Falik at the closing ceremony of the International Tchaikovsky Competition, which is held every four years in Moscow, Russia. Her brother, Johann Paetsch, participated in the cello competition at the same event.

In October 1987, Paetsch played three concerts in Holland, directed by the leader of the Zurich Chamber Orchestra. The orchestra's manager arranged for Paetsch to come to Zurich, where a Swiss millionaire with a large collection of stringed instruments loaned her a Guarneri violin to use. Shortly after, German recording company Teldec signed her to a recording contract.

In October 1987, Paetsch recorded the 24 Capricci, Op.1 by Niccolò Paganini for Teldec. Paetsch then returned to Denver to perform the Brahm's Violin Concerto in D Major with Maestro JoAnn Falletta and the Denver Chamber Orchestra in April 1988.

In the summer of 1988, the Colorado Springs Symphony Orchestra, under conductor Charles Ansbacher, invited Paetsch to play in Colorado Springs and in the Ford Amphitheatre in Vail, where she performed the Mendelssohn Violin Concerto in E minor.

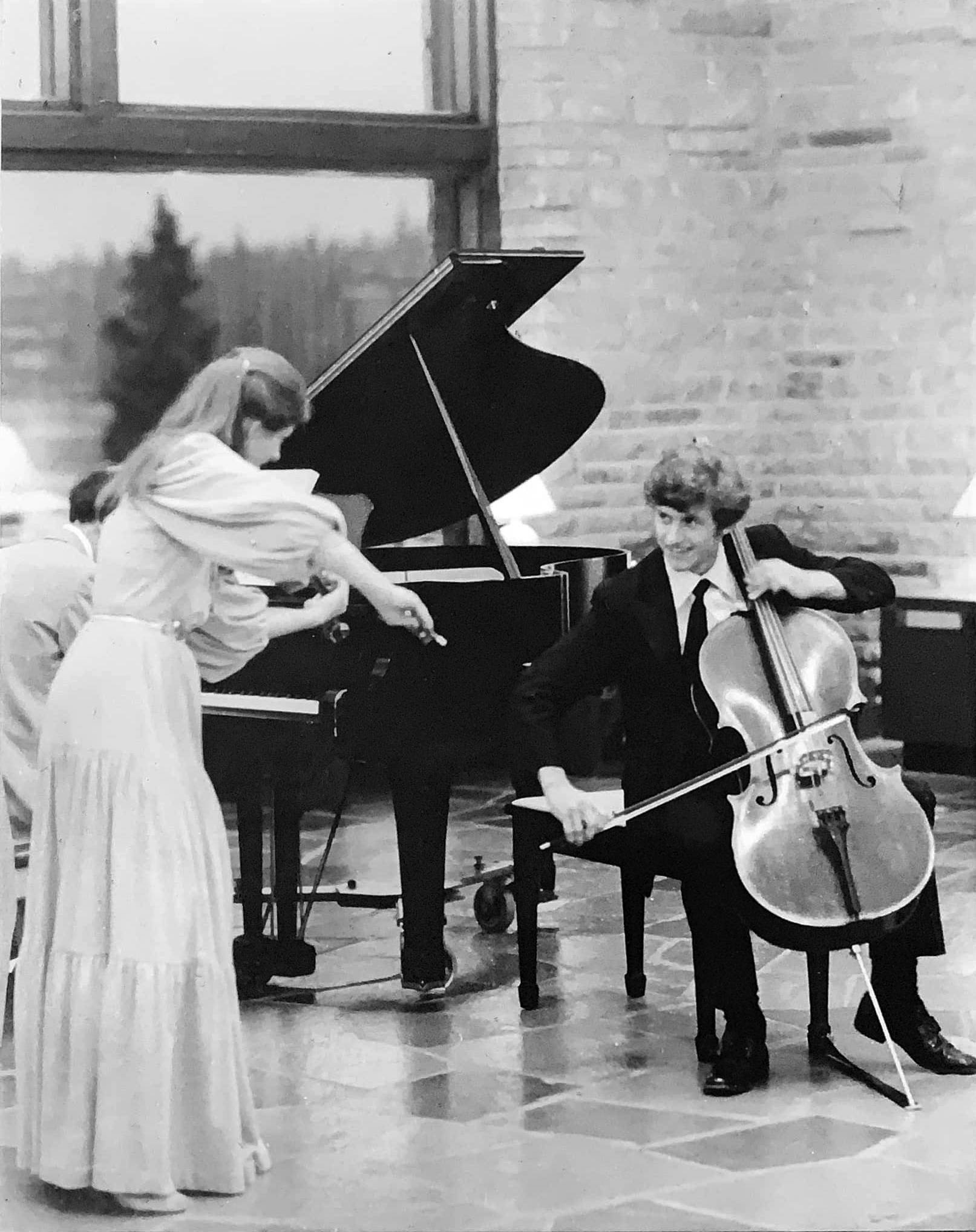
Paetsch and her brother Johann performing the Brahms Double Concerto

Paetsch performed for audiences worldwide as a soloist, recitalist, and chamber musician across the world. Notably, she played venues such as Carnegie Hall and Avery Fischer Hall in New York, as well as at the Library of Congress in Washington, D.C.

Paetsch also performed at music festivals, including Marlboro in Vermont, Davos in Switzerland, Brandenburg Summer Concerts in Berlin, Banff in Canada, and Boulder Bach Festival and the "Mostly Mozart" festivals in New York. She participated in the Rhein-Sieg and Niederrhein Chamber Music Festivals, both located in Germany.

Paetsch performed internationally, appearing with orchestras in Japan, South Korea, Belgium, Norway, Germany, the United Kingdom, Switzerland, and Italy. Her engagements included the NHK Symphony Orchestra in Tokyo; the philharmonic orchestras of Osaka and Seoul; the Orchestre Philharmonique de Liège; and the Bergen Philharmonic Orchestra. She also worked with ensembles such as the National Orchestra of Belgium, the Gewandhaus in Leipzig, the Hallé Orchestra in Manchester, the Frankfurt Radio Symphony, the Residentie Orchestra, the Orchestre de la Suisse Romande, the BBC Symphony Orchestra in London, and the Orchestra della Svizzera Italiana.

Paetsch collaborated with conductors including Kent Nagano, Dmitri Kitayenko, Horst Stein, and Myung-whun Chung.

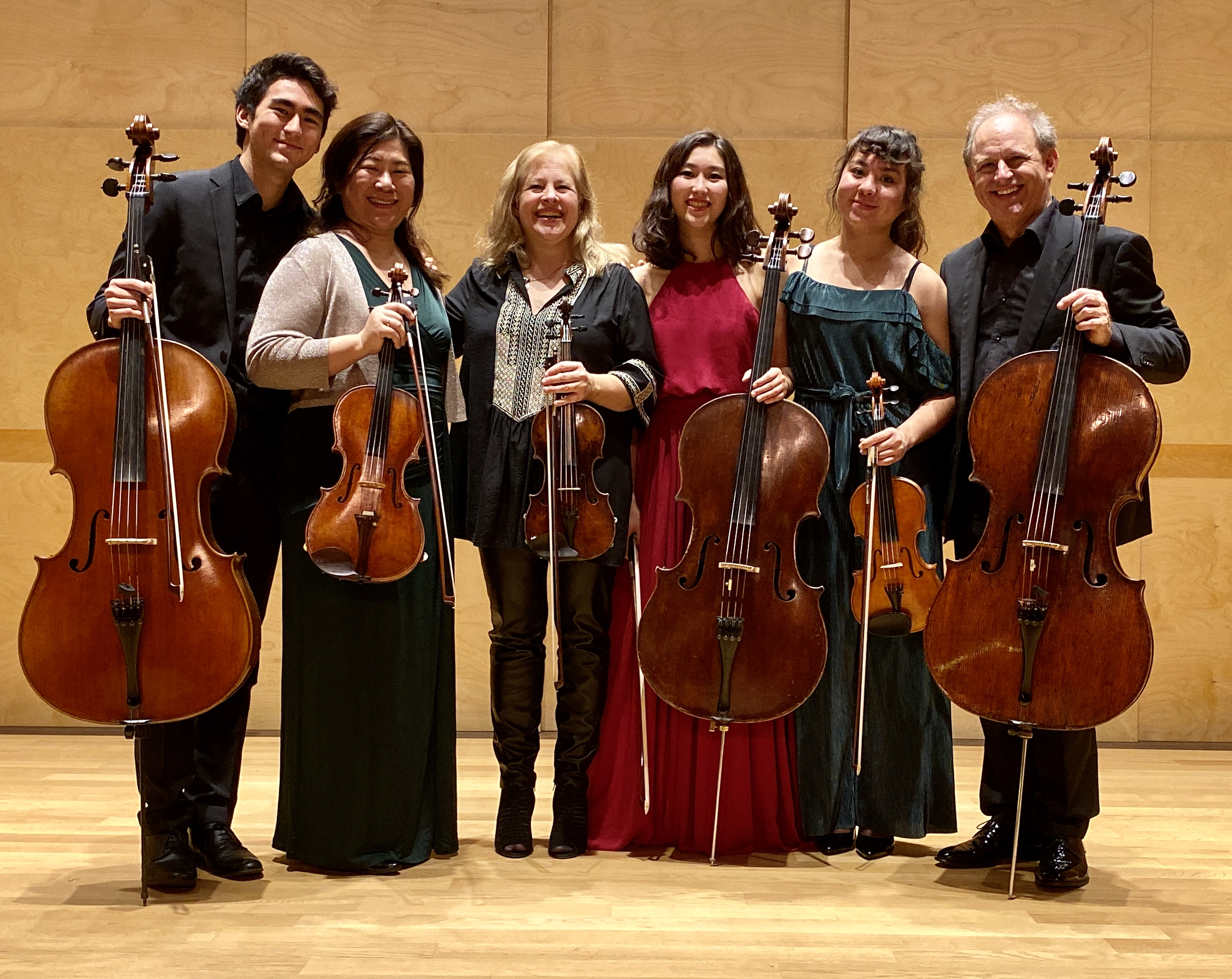
Paetsch and family members after a concert in Bellmund, Switzerland 2019

Her recorded music contains a diverse range of pieces, including Niccolo Paganini's 24 Caprices (1987), Joachim Raff's concertos with the Bamberg Symphony Orchestra, and "Sonatillen, Op. 99" and "Morceaux, Op. 85" featuring Eric Le Van on piano, Brahms' "21 Hungarian Dances" and "La Capricieuse". Paetsch also contributed to the live recording of Sofia Gubaidulina's Offertorium as the featured soloist with the Bern Symphony Orchestra. Her recordings have been released through record labels such as Sony Classical, Arte Nova (BMG), CPO, Tudor and ARSIS. Paetsch was the first American woman to record all 24 Paganini Caprices for solo violin.

In 1993, Paetsch became the violinist for the quartet Ensemble Incanto, with which she toured extensively and recorded regularly.

== Personal life ==
On August 3, 1990, Paetsch married Klaus Neftel in Bern, Switzerland. Their daughter, Anna Nora Neftel, was born in 1992.

Paetsch was a horse rider and broke her first stallion at age nine. Her parents also raised Polish-bred registered Purebred Arabian horses at their house in Colorado Springs.

== Death ==
Paetsch died in a palliative clinic in Bern, Switzerland, on January 20, 2023, at the age of 61, from complications due to cancer.

== Awards ==
- 1984, First prize, G. B. Dealey Awards
- 1985, First prize, Queen Elisabeth Competition
- 1986, Special prize, International Tchaikovsky Competition

== Discography ==
Release	Composer/Title of work	Performer	Label/Catalog no.	Format	Ref
1987	Niccolò Paganini: 24 Capricci Op.1	Michaela Paetsch ‘’(violin)’’	Teldec 6.43922	CD	
1990	Sofia Gubaidulina: Offertorium (violin concerto)	Berner Symphonieorchester; Dmitri Kitayenko (conductor)	BMG DDD 1002 Konzeertmitschnitt	CD	
1991	Luigi Boccherini: Streichquintett Op. 28 Nor. 2	Pina Carmirelli, Gary Hoffman, Ramon Bolipata, Toby Hoffman, Michaela Paetsch	Sony 47298	CD	
1992	Davos Music Festival F. Poulenc, W.A. Mozart, R. Strauss, S. Prokofiev, E. Toch, F. Mendelssohn	Stefan Henneberger (conductor), Chamber Ensemble: Stefan Buri, Diana Doherty, Dénes Várjon, Pascal Siffert, Marina Piccinini, Stephanie Gonley, Françoise Groben, Guido Schiefen, Irina Nikitina, Kyoko Takezawa, Douglas Paterson, Regula Schneider, Regine Guthauser, Andreas Haefliger, Ursula Fiedler, Stefano Wenk, Anthony Marwood, Michaela Paetsch, Ilya Konovalov, Anna Pfister	Sony 47298	CD	
1995	Johannes Brahms: 21 Ungarische Tänze (arr. Michaela Paetsch)	Michaela Paetsch Neftel (violin); Liese Klahn (piano)	Tudor 7037	CD	
1995	Johannes Brahms: Klarinettenquintett Op. 115	Michaela Paetsch (violin); Rahel Cunz (violin); Harmut Rohde (viola); Guido Schiefen (cello); Ralph Manno (clarinet)	Oehms Classics 259	CD	
1995	Paul Hindemith: Quartett für Klarinette, Violine, Cello und Piano; Duette für Klarinette und Violine	Ensemble Incanto - String Quartet: Ralph Manno (clarinet); Michaela Paetsch (violin); Guido Schiefen (cello); Liese Klahn (piano)	cpo 999 302-2	CD	
1997	W. A. Mozart: Klarinettenquintett	Ralph Manno (clarinet); Michaela Paetsch (violin); Rahel Cunz (violin); Hartmut Rohde (viola); Guido Schiefen (cello)	Arte Nova-Nr. 74321433252	CD	
1997	Daron Hagen: Strings Attached	Michaela Paetsch (violin); Charles Noble (viola); Robert LaRue (cello)	Arsis 111	CD	
2000	Joseph Joachim Raff: Violinkonzerte 1; Violinkonzerte 2; Cavatina; ”Ungrischer”	Michaela Paetsch (violin); Hans Stadlmair (conductor); Bamberger Symphoniker	Tudor 7086	CD	
2000	Bela Bartok, Contrasts; Aram Khachaturian, Trio; Darius Milhaud, Suite; Igor Stravinsky, L’histoire du Soldat	ensemble incanto	Arte Nova-Nr. 74321721052	CD	
2001	Olivier Messiaen: Quatuor pour la fin du temps	ensemble incanto: Ralph Manno (clarinet); Michaela Paetsch (violin); Guido Schiefen (cello); Liese Klahn (piano)	Arte Nova-Nr. 70762	CD	
2003	Joseph Joachim Raff: 10 Sonatillen; 6 Morceaux	Michaela Paetsch (violin); Eric Le Van (piano)	Tudor 7109	CD	
2004	Peter Härtling liest Schumanns “Schatten”	Musik ensemble incanto	Querstand VKJK 0403	CD	
2005	Arthur Furer: Violinkonzert Nr.3 (von 1956/57)	Michaela Paetsch (violin); Kaspar Zehnder (conductor); Prague Philharmonia	Musikverlag Müller & Schade AG in Bern live bit Schnitt	CD	
2011	’’La Capricieuse’’: Virtuose Musik für Violine und Akkordeon	Michaela Paetsch (violin); Wiesław Pipcynski (accordion)	Tudor 7168	CD	
	Felix, Mendelssohn: Octet for Strings in E flat Major, Op.20	Anthony Marwodd (violin); Kyoko Takezawa (violin); Michaela Paetsch (violin); Ilya Konovalov (violin); Douglas Paterson (viola); Anna Pfister (viola); Guido Schiefen (cello); Francoise Groben (cello)	Musik Festival Davos	CD	
