= Albert Tilford Johnson =

American banker (1851–1916)

- Born: November 1, 1851; Peoria, Illinois, U.S.
- Died: December 24, 1916; Peoria, Illinois, U.S.
- Occupation: Bank clerk
- Spouse: Elizabeth Breading McIlvaine (m. 1881)
- Children: 3, including Harry McClure Johnson

Albert Tilford Johnson (November 1, 1851 – December 24, 1916) was a successful banker in Peoria, Illinois.

== Early life ==
Descended from one of Peoria's oldest pioneer families, Johnson was the first of four children but the only son of the Swedish immigrants John Johnson (1828–1857) and Anne Matilda Anderson (1829–1905). He was born in Peoria, IL and he had three younger sisters; Almire "Myra" Johnson (1853–1883), Emma Rebecca Johnson (1855–1904) and Sophie Christine Johnson (1857–1954). His father died when he was only 5 years old. By the time he was 18 years old he was already working as a bank clerk in Peoria, Illinois.

== Middle years ==
Johnson was known to be a gentleman of the highest character whose friendships were many and sincere. He married Elizabeth Breading McIlvaine (1858–1950) at the age of 30 on December 29, 1881, in Peoria, Illinois. She was a professional organist. They had three children: Elizabeth M. (Johnson) Scales in 1883, who later moved to Chicago, Harry McClure Johnson in 1886, who turned into a practicing attorney of Chicago, and Albert "Bert" Tilford Jr in 1888, who became a civil engineer in San Francisco. Albert T. Johnson worked in George Hogg McIlvaine's, his father-in-law's, bank called the Peoria National Bank for more than 30 years as a correspondent and bank clerk. He was also secretary and treasurer of Grace Presbyterian Church for over 30 years in the same city, Peoria.

== Later years ==
Johnson severed the connection with the Peoria National Bank, with which he had been connected to for over thirty years, in 1900 when his health started to fail and this caused his retirement from his active business life. In 1908 he went up to British Columbia where his only sister, Mrs. Sophia Ellison resided, in search of ways to better his health. The climate was proven to be beneficial and much of his time was spent there. He suffered a stroke of apoplexy in 1913 and was brought back home to Peoria. In his later years he would spend his summers up in Vernon, British Columbia, Canada, and return to Peoria for the winters. While Albert T. Johnson was up in Vernon, in the 1910 Vernon Directory, he was listed as working as a bookkeeper at the Okanagan Saddlery Co. In June 1916 he returned to British Columbia and returned to Peoria in November in apparent good health.

== Death ==
Johnson died on December 24, 1916, of blood poisoning resulting from a defective tooth at the age of 65. He is buried in the Springdale Cemetery in Peoria.
