= Zachary Carrettin =

American violinist & violist

- Origin: Houston
- Genre: classical
- Occupations: Musician, Conductor, Composer, Professor
- Years active: 1996–present
- Labels: Cinnabar Records, Sono Luminus
- Website: zacharycarrettin.com

Zachary Carrettin is an American violinist, violist, conductor, and music educator. Carrettin is currently the music director of Boulder Bach Festival.

== Education ==
Mr. Carrettin holds Bachelor and Master of Music degrees in violin performance from Rice University Shepherd School of Music, where he was a student of Kenneth Goldsmith and Sergiu Luca. He holds a Master of Music degree in Orchestral Conducting from the University of Illinois at Urbana-Champaign, where he studied conducting with Donald Schleicher, and a Professional Studies Certificate in conducting from the National University of Music in Bucharest, Romania, where he was the assistant to Maestro Dumitru Goia. He studied orchestral conducting at festivals and master classes internationally with Michael Tilson Thomas, Larry Rachleff, Kenneth Kiesler and Michael Morgan, and pursued professional viola studies with Richard Wolfe in Amsterdam and with Ivo van der Werff while a student in the Doctor of Musical Arts program at Rice University.

== Career ==
=== Conductor ===
Carrettin gave his symphony orchestra conducting debut with the Royal Philharmonic of Kishinev, Moldavia, and has since conducted professional orchestras in Germany, the Czech Republic, Romania, Bolivia, and the United States. He has appeared as conductor with the Tri-Valley Youth Symphony and the Oakland Youth Orchestra in California, the Wabash Valley Youth Symphony in Indiana, the Houston Youth Symphony Sinfonia, the 2011 Fort Bend All-Region Orchestra, and the Illini Orchestra at the University of Illinois, where he led the ensemble in a number of world-premiere performances. In 2005, Carrettin conducted the first-known performance of Giuseppe Antonio Capuzzi’s ballet music, “l’Impostore punito”, at Rice University Shepherd School of Music as part of the Capuzzi Festival. On the podium he has accompanied numerous soloists including pianist Ian Hobson, violinist Dylana Jenson and harpsichordist Charlotte Mattax in orchestral projects ranging from baroque and classical period instruments to contemporary instruments and repertory.

=== Musician ===
In the realm of baroque, classical and romantic period instruments, he has served as concertmaster and concerto soloist with chamber orchestras such as the American Bach Soloists in San Francisco, Musica Angelica in Los Angeles, Camerata Pacifica in Santa Barbara, Houston's Ars Lyrica, the Holy Trinity Bach Vespers Orchestra in New York, and at the Boulder Bach Festival. He has toured extensively and recorded with New World baroque music group, El Mundo, the choir Chanticleer, the Bergen Philharmonic Orchestra, and with new age icon, Yanni. Additionally, Carrettin has performed and recorded as a duo partner with pianist Mina Gajic.

In the capacity of solo electric violinist and composer, Zachary Carrettin has toured four continents with aerial dance troupe, Project Bandaloop, including a private performance for the Sultan and Royal Family of Oman, in Muscat. He performed as electric violin soloist at the 1998 and 1999 Reliant Energy Power of Houston Festival in collaboration with OrchestraX and Project Bandaloop. His compositions have been heard at the Kennedy Center for the Performing Arts, the Shubert Theatre in Boston, the San Francisco War Memorial Opera House, the Museum of Contemporary Art in Rovereto, Italy, and in São Paulo, Brazil, presented by the Bachiana Chamber Orchestra and IBM. An active chamber musician playing both violin and viola, Carrettin has collaborated with the Tokyo String Quartet, Chanticleer (ensemble), and the Assad Brothers, and has performed in various capacities at the San Luis Obispo Mozart Festival, the Oregon Bach Festival, the La Jolla Music Society Summerfest, Cherry Creek Arts Festival in Denver, the Detroit Festival of the Arts and at Seattle’s Bumbershoot.

Carrettin is Music Director of COmpass REsonance, a strings-based ensemble in Boulder, Colorado. Recent soloists include Vadim Gluzman, with whom the ensemble is recording baroque and contemporary works in 2025.
