= Harry McClure Johnson =

American lawyer (1886–1932)

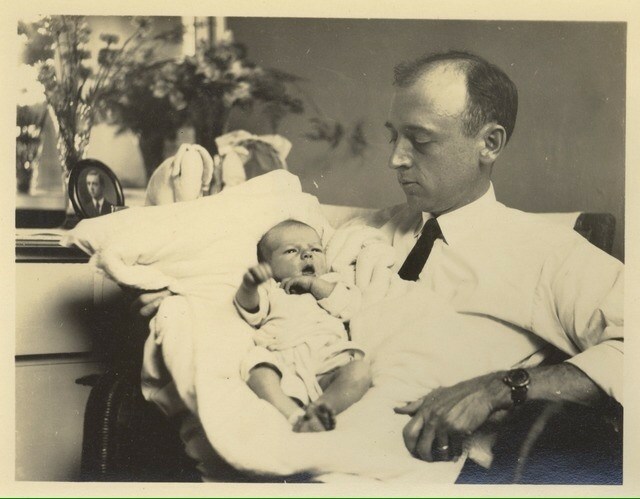
- Johnson (right) cradling his son, Harry Johnson II (left), 1925
- Born: May 13, 1886; Peoria, Illinois, U.S.
- Died: March 29, 1932; Toronto, Ontario, Canada
- Education: Northwestern University Law School (LLB)
- Occupation: Lawyer
- Spouse: Helena Modjeska Chase (m. 1923)
- Children: 5, including Priscilla
- Father: Albert Tilford Johnson
- Relatives: Price Ellison (uncle)
- Military career
- Allegiance: United States
- Branch: United States Army
- Service years: 1918
- Rank: First lieutenant

Harry McClure Johnson (May 13, 1886 – March 29, 1932) was an American lawyer and explorer. He practiced law in Chicago with the firm Offield, Bulkley, Poole, and Scott. Johnson served as the chronicler for the 1910 expedition to the summit of Crown Mountain, which contributed to the establishment of the provincial park system in British Columbia.

== Early life and education ==
Johnson was born on May 13, 1886, in Peoria, Illinois. Johnson's father, Albert Tilford Johnson, was the founder and president of Peoria's principal banking house, and his mother, Elizabeth Breading McIlvaine Johnson, was a high school teacher. He had two siblings, Albert Tilford Johnson Jr. and Elizabeth Johnson. He was also the nephew of the Canadian politician Price Ellison, newspaper owner and Minister of Crown Lands in Vernon, British Columbia, Canada.

Johnson graduated from Peoria High School second in the class of 1903. He received academic awards for excellence in history, politics, and economics at Princeton University in 1907, delivering the Latin salutatory address at commencement on June 12. Johnson received a Bachelor of Laws degree from Northwestern University Law School in 1910.

== Military life ==
Johnson participated in two military training camps for civilians in 1915 and 1916. The following year, a major surgical operation meant he was unable to serve in the military until late 1918, when he was appointed the position of first lieutenant in the United States Army. He served in the quartermaster general's office in Washington, D.C. After the Armistice and during the years 1919 and 1920, he was engaged as counsel in the Legal Department of the United States Emergency Fleet Corporation in Philadelphia. Following his departure from the army, Johnson worked as an assistant counsel for the Emergency Fleet Corporation construction division in Philadelphia for over a year. Later, he practiced law on the Pacific Coast in British Columbia and California.

== Legal career ==
On December 23, 1910, Johnson was admitted to practice law after taking the Illinois bar examination. He made his home in Winnetka, Illinois, in Cook County, 16 miles north of Chicago. Returning to practice in Chicago in 1921, he joined Offield, Mehlhope, Scott & Poole which was the predecessor of the firm he partnered with around the time of his death.

== Personal life ==
Johnson married Helena Modjeska Chase of Omaha, Nebraska, on June 30, 1923, in Ashokan, New York. At that time, Chase divided her time between New York and Omaha, and was active in North Shore art circles. After their marriage, the couple moved to Winnetka, Illinois. They had five children together:

- Mansi McClure Johnson (1924–2013)
- Harry McClure Johnson (1925–2007)
- Elizabeth McIlvaine Johnson (born 1926)
- Sarah Jane McClure Johnson (1929–2013)
- Priscilla McClure Johnson (1931–2017)

Johnson died on March 29, 1932, at the age of 46 in Toronto, Ontario, while visiting his mother, Elizabeth “Gaga” Breading McIlvaine Johnson. He had been in poor health for two years before his death, and died after a period of influenza, which developed into pneumonia.

== Alpine Club of Canada ==
Johnson was a life member of the Alpine Club of Canada, with which he climbed Mount Robson and Mount Assiniboine in the Canadian Rockies.

In 1910, Johnson and 20 others went on an expedition to Vancouver Island to assess the potential for a park in the center of the island. Johnson was the expedition's unofficial chronicler, assisting Price Ellison, the Minister of Crown Lands, while also contributing to college periodicals at Princeton during the exploration. Ellison's expedition journal describes encounters with mosquitoes, sand flies, snakes, blow-downs, steep trails, and tree roots, as well as the scenery.

The team of explorers (including Johnson) left the town of Campbell River, British Columbia, and traveled inland along the Campbell River to Upper Campbell Lake. Later, a party of eight scaled the Crown Mountain (Vancouver Island, British Columbia), and its peak was later named after Myra King Ellison, a member of the party and Johnson's cousin. Following the ascent, the party continued its exploration of the surrounding lakes, rivers and valleys, crossed the divide and descended to the western sea down Buttle Lake in British Columbia, up to Price Creek, and wound up at the Port Alberni. The expedition reported to the legislature that the area was suitable to become the province's first park at a time when much of the region remained uninhabited wilderness. This expedition contributed to the 1911 establishment of Strathcona Provincial Park, named after Lord Strathcona, the railway tycoon who drove the last spike for the Canadian Pacific Railway at Craigellachie.

After climbing Crown Mountain, Johnson wrote about encouraging American tourist groups, mountain climbers, and Canadian clubs to visit many of the big cities in the United States.

On 7 August 1912 he and his cousin climbed Mount Little, which is on the border between Alberta and British Columbia.

== Ancestry ==
Ancestors of Harry McClure Johnson

4. John Johnson (1828-1857)
2. Albert Tilford Johnson (1851-1916)
10. Pehr Andersson (1797-1847)
5. Anna Matilda Anderson (1829-1905)
11. Kerstin Olofsdotter (1798-1849)
1. Harry McClure Johnson (1886-1932)
12. William Brown McIlvaine (1807-1892)
6. George Hogg McIlvaine (1834-1897)
13. Elizabeth Breading (1810-1850)
3. Elizabeth Breading McIlvaine (1858-1950
14. Josiah Espy McClure (1798-1899)
7. Priscilla Jane McClure (1834-1913)
15. Jane Dickson (1806-1842)
