= Priscilla Paetsch =

American musician and composer (1931–2017)

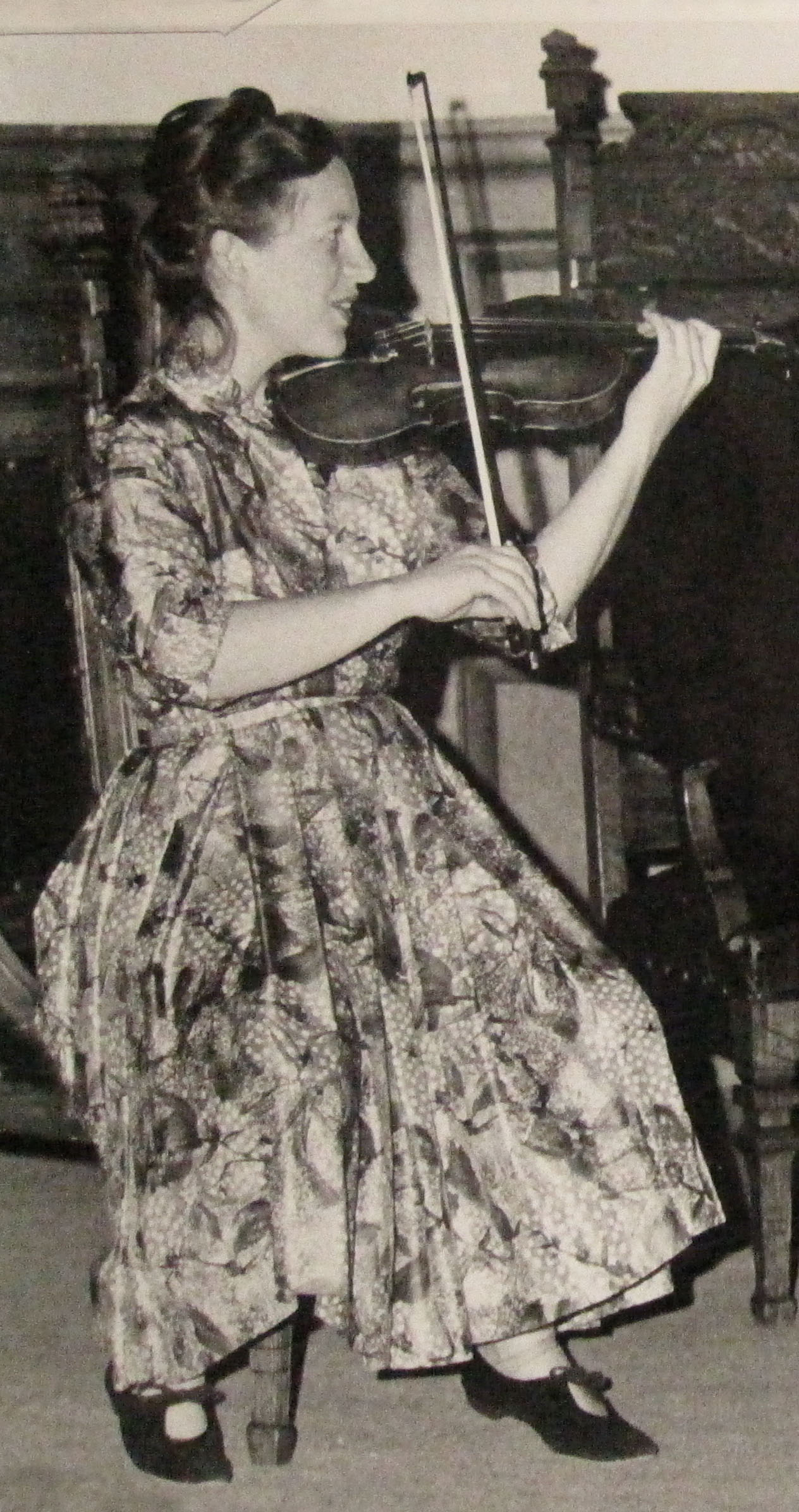
- Paetsch playing her violin
- Born: Priscilla McClure Johnson; November 18, 1931; Evanston, Illinois, U.S.
- Died: July 19, 2017 (aged 85); Colorado Springs, Colorado, U.S.
- Education: Bennington College; University of Wyoming (BA, MA)
- Occupations: Violinist; composer; artist; sculptor; horse trainer
- Spouse: Günther Johannes Paetsch (m. 1959)
- Children: 7, including Michaela and Johann
- Parents: Harry McClure Johnson (father); Helena Modjeska Chase (mother)

Priscilla McClure Paetsch (née Johnson; November 18, 1931 – July 19, 2017) was an American violinist, composer, artist, sculptor, horse trainer, and the co-founder of the Paetsch Family Chamber Music Ensemble in Colorado Springs, Colorado.

== Early life and education ==
Priscilla McClure Johnson was born in Evanston, Illinois, United States, on November 18, 1931. In 1946, at the age of 15, she wrote and illustrated the children's book How the Eggplant Came to Be which was published by Adventure Trails Publications.

From 1946 to 1950, Paetsch attended The Putney School in Vermont, where she majored in violin, chamber music, and orchestral performance. She continued her musical studies at Bennington College in Vermont from 1950 to 1952, majoring in violin performance. After relocating to the University of Wyoming, she earned a Bachelor of Arts degree with a major in violin, followed in 1956 by a Master of Arts degree in music composition, graduating with highest honors. Her training also included advanced study at the Aspen Institute of Music in Colorado from 1954 to 1955 and at the Detmold Musikhochschule in Germany in 1957.

== Career ==
Paetsch taught violin, viola, and chamber music as a professor at the University of Wyoming from 1955 to 1956 and at Colorado College from 1955 to 1956. She was the Music Director of the World Tour as a violinist and composer from 1956 to 1957 through the Putney Graduate School of Teacher Education. Also In 1957, Paetsch was invited to be a member of the international jury representing the United States in the International Stringed Instrument Competition held in Moscow, Russia.

Between 1956 and 1959, Paetsch undertook a two-and-a-half-year World Study Trip sponsored by the Putney Graduate School of Teacher Education, traveling throughout Europe, Africa, and the Middle East to examine musical traditions and educational systems.

From 1960 to 1961, she served as the music director of the Arvada Symphony in Colorado and also taught stringed instruments in the R-1 School District. Later, she taught violin and chamber music at the Pine Spring Ranch School of Music, where she served as both a coach and a violinist in the Paetsch–Fodor Chamber Music Ensemble in Steamboat Springs, Colorado.

In 1967, Paetsch became a professor of violin, viola, and chamber music at the Cosmic Heights School of Music in Colorado Springs.

== Personal life ==
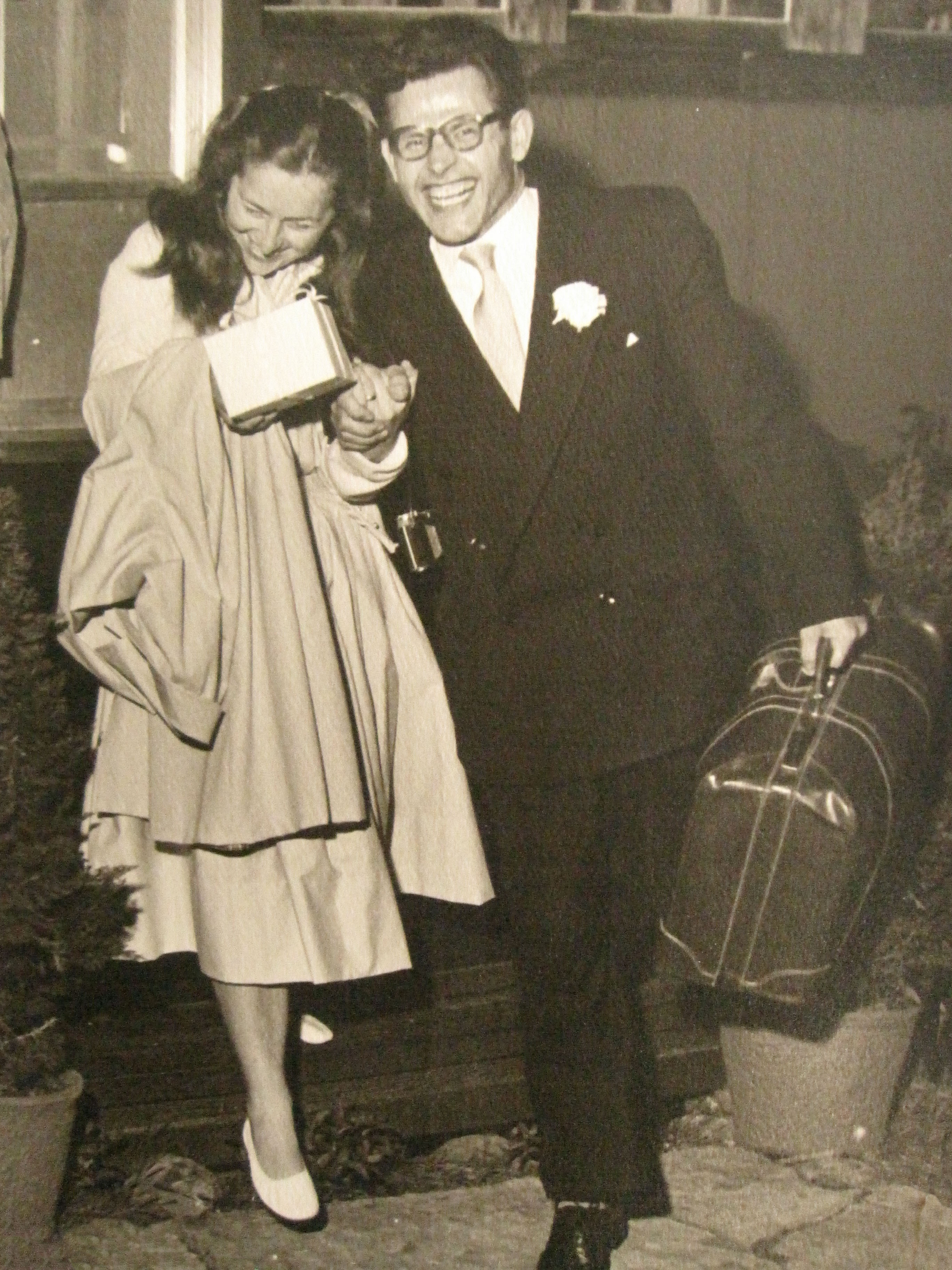
Priscilla and Günther Paetsch on their wedding May 24th 1959 in Colorado Springs

On February 21, 1957, Paetsch traveled to Tübingen, Germany, where she met Günther Johannes Paetsch, who would later become her husband.

Priscilla insisted that if he were to marry her, he must at least experience the country and lifestyle she grew up in. Although he couldn't speak English, he agreed and followed her back to the US. Priscilla married Günther Johannes Paetsch in Colorado Springs, Colorado, on May 24 1959, at her mother's house.

The couple had seven children: Phebe, Michaela, Brigitte, Johann Sebastian, Christian, Engelbert, and Siegmund.

Priscilla and Günther's children would eventually form their own nine-piece group: The Paetsch Family Chamber Music Ensemble.

== Compositions ==
Paetsch was a first chair violinist with the Colorado Springs Symphony. She began composing at the age of 12, with a piece for two violins. She received her formal composition training first at Bennington College with the 12-tone composer, Leonel Novak, followed by training at the University of Wyoming with Allan A. Willman. Paetsch received her master's degree in composition at the University of Wyoming. Her compositions have been performed in Colorado Springs as well as in the United States, Europe, and Russia.

Priscilla's compositions include:

- Composition for 2 violins (1943)
- Symphony No. 1
- String Quartets
- String Trio
- Sonata in D Major (1960)
- Sonata for Violin and Piano
- Rondo for Violin and Piano
- Caprice for Solo Violin
- Four-Voiced Choral Fugue

The American String Teachers Association (ASTA) awarded her "Best Violin Teacher of the Year" in 1978.

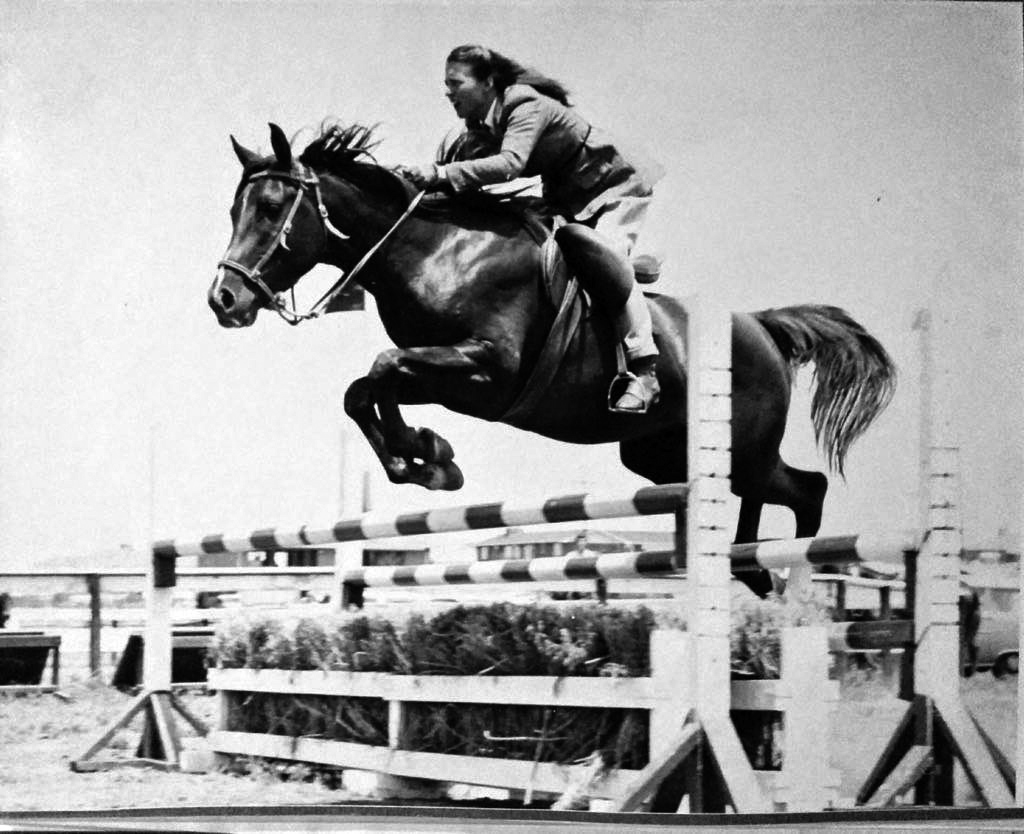
Paetsch jumping with her Arabian Stallion, Zigaro, 1965

== Horse Training ==
A member of the Arabian Horse Registry of America, Paetsch raised, bred, and trained Polish-bred registered Arabian horses. She participated in many horse shows, such as the 1965 Broadmoor Arabian Show.
