= COmpass REsonance =

Baroque, Classical and Romantic Music Festival

COmpass REsonance (previously known as the Boulder Bach Festival) is a music ensemble based in Boulder, Colorado, known for its diverse repertoire spanning across the Baroque, Classical, and Romantic eras in addition to new music including commissioning living composers. Founded in 1981, the festival has evolved significantly over time, expanding its musical offerings and community engagement beyond its initial focus solely on Johann Sebastian Bach's music.

== History and evolution ==
Founded in 1981, the organization, expanded its musical offerings and community engagement over time beyond its initial focus solely on Johann Sebastian Bach's music. COmpass REsonance became the ensemble-in-residence at Boulder Bach Festival in 2019, and in 2025 the nonprofit rebranded with a new mission statement.

Under the stewardship of Zachary Carrettin, who assumed the role of the festival's music director in 2013-14, and Mina Gajić, who assumed the role of the organization's Artistic Director in 2019-20, the event has significantly expanded its offerings and programming.

COmpass REsonance (abbreviated as CORE) has collaborated with soloists, contemporary dance, and multimedia, and has also commissioned new work, while presenting repertoire with roots in the Baroque Era.

== Artistic offerings and concerts ==
Since Carrettin assumed creative control of the organization in 2013, Boulder Bach Festival’s, concert lineup broadened to include a variety of musical genres and eras. While Bach's music remained a central focus, the repertoire expanded to incorporate works by composers such as Brahms, Haydn, Chopin, Mozart, Stravinsky, Part, Schnittke, and Bloch. Performances have showcased a mix of period instruments and modern adaptations.

== Outreach and educational initiatives ==
The COmpass REsonance actively engages in community-driven programs, presenting over 40 concerts annually in hospitals, schools, retirement homes, libraries, and museums, offering these events free of charge. The festival's ensemble Fellowship Artist Initiative, a program providing mentorship to young musicians embarking on their professional careers.
