= Grace Presbyterian Church (Peoria, Illinois) =

Coordinates: 40.795°N 89.670°W

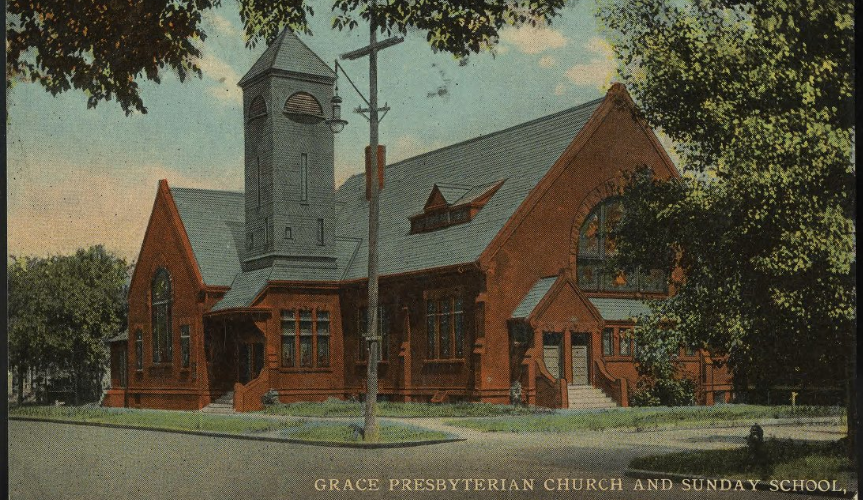
- Grace Presbyterian Church
- Address: 8607 State Route 91 Peoria, IL 61615
- Country: USA
- Denomination: Presbyterian
- Website: https://www.gracepres.org

History
- Founded: 1862

Grace Presbyterian Church is a Protestant congregation located in Peoria, Illinois. The church's 1,500 members are affiliated with the Presbyterian Church in America.

== History ==
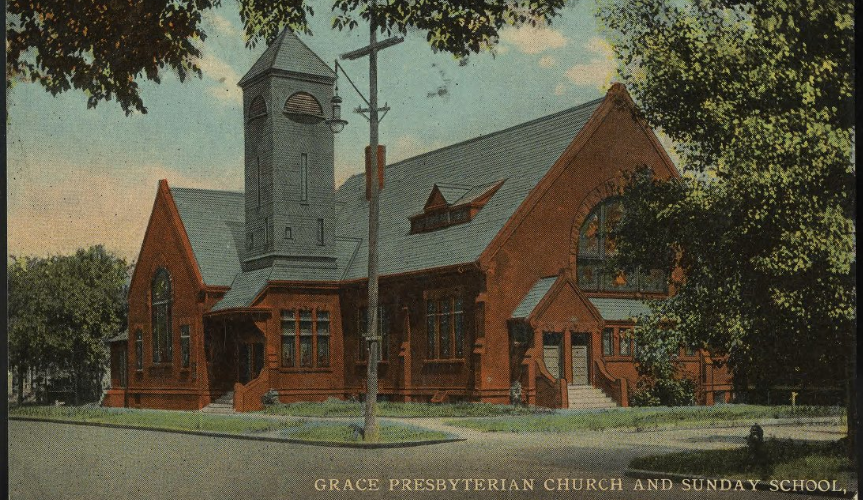
Grace Presbyterian Church, Peoria, IL

Initially called the Fourth Ward Mission School, Grace Presbyterian was founded in 1862 as a Sunday School for area youth. It was associated with the Old School Presbyterian Church, which identified with Calvinist Orthodoxy and emphasized education over revivalism. The school was sponsored by the former First Presbyterian Church of Peoria as part of its "sabbath school" movement.

D.W. McWilliams, the first superintendent, was a prominent railroad man who had relocated from New York to Peoria. He was able to secure a passenger rail coach to use as a meeting place. The school started with 19 children. In 1868, the group was able to organize as a church, which was a goal of the school's founding. Originally just called Grace Church, it was renamed Grace Presbyterian Church in 1883.

The Church's first permanent location, at Wayne Street and Madison Avenue, was a wooden structure built in 1873. It was destroyed by fire in 1890 and replaced by a brick structure at the same location. In 1973 a larger sanctuary was added. The church experienced large and sustained growth throughout the 1960s, 70s and 80s. The church attracted several from other Protestant congregations, sometimes due to concerns regarding the World Council of Churches.

In 1981, the church voted unanimously to disaffiliate with the United Presbyterian Church in the United States of America. A departure agreement allowed Grace Presbyterian to leave the denominational alliance and retain property ownership rights. In 1982, after exploring several options, the church Session voted to join the Presbyterian Church in America.

== Ministry ==
Grace Presbyterian Church operates numerous ministries serving children, youth, adults, and seniors.

Construction of a new campus began in the late 2000s. The project included a new worship center seating approximately 1,600 people, including classrooms, administrative offices, gathering spaces, expanded parking, and landscaped grounds.
