= Günther Johannes Paetsch =

German-born cellist and inventor (1929–1997)

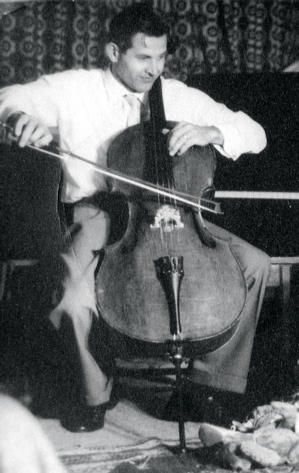
- Günther Johannes Paetsch playing the cello.
- Born: September 24, 1929; Stuttgart, Germany
- Died: April 30, 1997 (aged 67); Colorado Springs, Colorado, United States
- Occupation: Cellist
- Spouse: Priscilla McClure Johnson (m. 1959)
- Children: Phebe Verena Paetsch (b. 1960); Michaela Modjeska Paetsch (1961–2023); Brigitte McClure Paetsch (b. 1963); Johann Sebastian Paetsch (b. 1964); Christian Friedeman Paetsch (b. 1966); Engelbert Raphael Paetsch (b. 1968); Siegmund Amadeus Paetsch (b. 1971)
- Parents: Heinrich Karl Willy Paetsch (father); Helene Marie Matt (mother)
- Relatives: Irmgard Elisabeth Paetsch (sister) (1925–1998)

Günther Johannes Paetsch (September 24, 1929 – April 30, 1997) was a German-American cellist and co-founder of the Paetsch Family Chamber Music Ensemble in Colorado Springs, Colorado, United States. He was the husband of violinist Priscilla Paetsch and the father of their seven children.

== Early life ==
Paetsch was born on September 24, 1929, in Stuttgart, Germany, the son of Heinrich Karl Willy Paetsch; (1892–1970) and Helene Marie (née Matt; 1889–1942) in the Württembergische Landeshebammenschule (a clinic in Baden-Württemberg where midwives are trained). Shortly afterwards he went home and then into the children's hospital (the Kinderklinik was near Senefelderstraße), when he got diphtheria. He, like all native Swabians, grew up speaking Schwäbisch, as the (Swabian German) dialect was spoken in much of the southwestern German state of Baden-Württemberg. He was often heard saying things like Guts Nächtle, which would be the equivalent of Gute Nacht in High German (or good night in English). Günther was one of the first sons to be born to a couple in The Christian Community church in Stuttgart that was inspired by Rudolf Steiner. Although not professional musicians, both his parents were musicians. His mother played the piano and his father played the cello. He had an older sister, Irmgard Elisabeth Paetsch (1925–1998), a pianist who taught in Stuttgart.

== World War II ==
Paetsch was very young during World War II in Stuttgart, and everything in his parents' home and its surroundings were destroyed by the aerial bombing. Stuttgart, like many cities in Germany, was left nearly flattened after the war, having been air raided at least 53 times during the nights, which destroyed 68% of the city.

On November 22, 1942, Paetsch's mother, Helena Maria, died while she was in the hospital as southern Stuttgart was attacked by 191 aircraft during a bombing raid in the early morning hours. The next night, there was a big bombing raid with search lights all over the sky looking for the airplanes, and ground forces firing back. Paetsch was 13 years old at the time. His maternal grandfather, Friedrich Matt, died on December 19, 1940, when their home was bombed during World War II. His aunt Mina Hedwig (Paetsch) Böttger also died in a bomb attack on September 13, 1944, in Stuttgart.

Paetsch started studying the cello in 1942, during World War II, with a teacher who came wearing his uniform, but eventually the teacher was transferred.

== Cello studies ==
Paetsch then studied the cello with the German principal cellist Wilhelm Hadelich from 1946/1947 until 1950. Because almost everything was destroyed, he taught Paetsch while sitting on potato crates in the ruins of the war, and as Hadelich's children (Sigismund and Valeska) were then babies, they were surrounded by the smells of diapers. Everything was done by heart, as there was no printed music to be found at this time of utter poverty and deprivation. Hadelich was as much a genius on the piano as on the cello.

Paetsch later took lessons with the Spanish cellist Gaspar Cassadó in Tübingen, Germany, who only taught two students privately during 1956–58. He didn't ask for money for the lessons, but would teach and then go to the café for coffee.

== Education ==
Paetsch was educated with Abitur or Reifezeugnis ("certificate of maturity"), the prerequisite for matriculation at a German university in the subjects of science, mathematics and languages, from the First Waldorf School in Stuttgart, Germany. He finished this degree in July 1950. Later in July 1954, Günther received his Diplom (M.A. Diploma Kaufmann), a business degree in accounting, business administration and finances from LMU Munich in Germany. In July 1958, Günther Johannes Paetsch received his M.A. in Law and First Bar Examination (Erste Juristishe Staatsprüfung) at the University of Tübingen.

He obtained working experience from 1953 until 1956, with some interruptions, to earn a master's degree at the Robert Bosch GmbH in Stuttgart (which had around 28,000 employees) as a mathematician in the Department of Corporation Insurance. Later, he became manager in the Department of Personnel, where he organised, staffed and directed a department of 480 employees. He was responsible for all administrative, planning and cost functions of technical and professional employees.

Eventually he became manager of the department of materials control, where he was responsible for purchases of electrical parts, material and special metal alloys, long-range planning, and contract negotiations. The monthly purchase volume was around $1 million. He supervised 35 employees. From September 1958 to October 1959, Paetsch was an assistant district judge in the Department of Justice of the state of Baden-Württemberg, Stuttgart, and then in the district court in Bad Cannstatt, Germany.

During this time, Paetsch was also a solo cellist in various orchestras in München, Stuttgart, and Tübingen. In Tübingen, he worked in the orchestra with the conductor Georg von Dadelsen and gained a deep knowledge of the works of Johann Sebastian Bach. During this time, he was also a first-rate photographer and an avid mountain climber.

== Priscilla ==
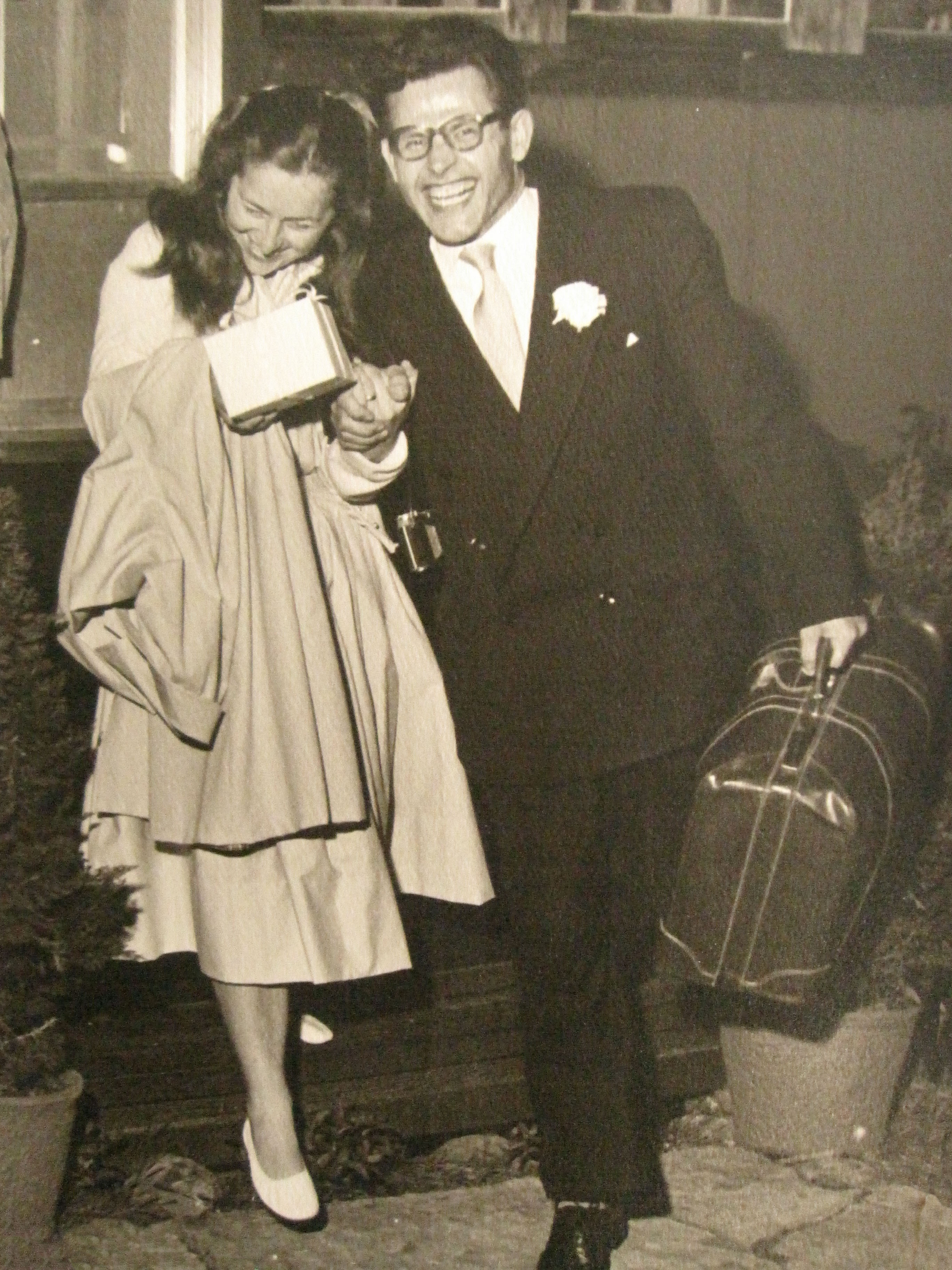
Priscilla and Gunther Paetsch on their wedding day, May 24, 1959, in Colorado Springs

In Tübingen on February 21, 1957, Paetsch (then 28) met the young 26-year-old American violinist Priscilla McClure Johnson, who was on a world tour at the time, and they fell in love. Paetsch came to the United States in 1959 not only to see where and how Priscilla grew up (she also trained Polish-bred registered Arabian horses), but also to marry her. They married on May 24, 1959, in Colorado Springs, followed by a two-month-long honeymoon on the top of the continental divide in the Colorado Rocky Mountains, on horseback. It was on this pack trip with three horses that he learned to ride a horse. He also grew a long, full beard and looked like a real cowboy, and there are stories that say he looked like a wild Mexican (because he spoke a language other than English).

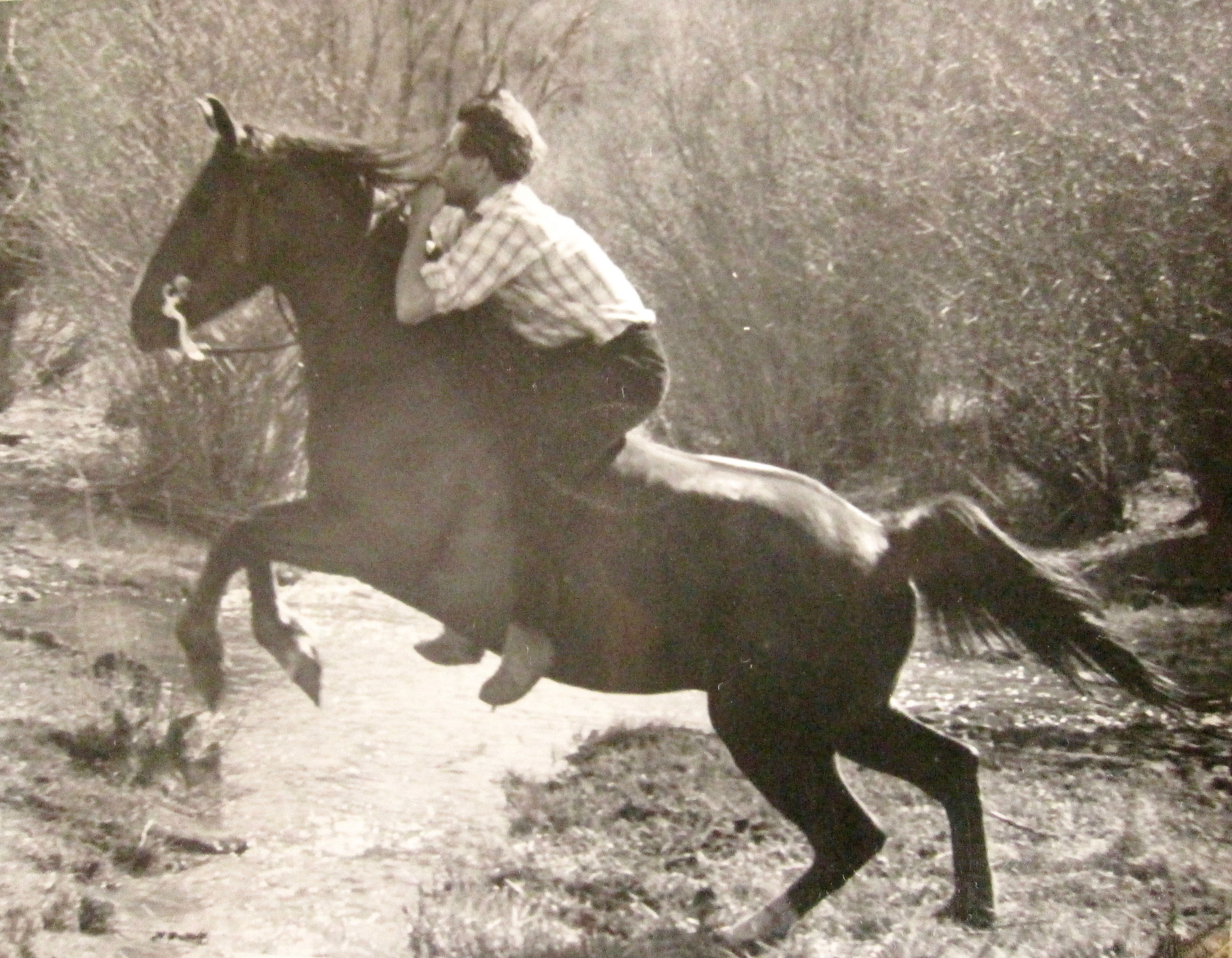
Gunther Paetsch jumping an Arabian stallion bareback over a creek in Steamboat Springs, Colorado

His first job in the US was as a horse riding instructor and soccer teacher at the Lowell Whitman School in Steamboat Springs in 1959, after his honeymoon.

From November 1959 until September 1960, he worked as a "law-editor" at Shepard's Citations in Colorado Springs. He pursued private studies from 1960 to 1961 in comparative law and business administration at the University of Colorado in Boulder.

Günther Paetsch was principal cellist in the Colorado Springs Symphony Orchestra through three conductors: Walter Eisenburg, Harold Farberman and Charles Ansbacher. He was also principal cellist of the Chamber Soloists of Colorado Springs, the Baroque Players, the Colorado Springs Opera, the Colorado College Orchestra, and the Orchestra in Grace Church.

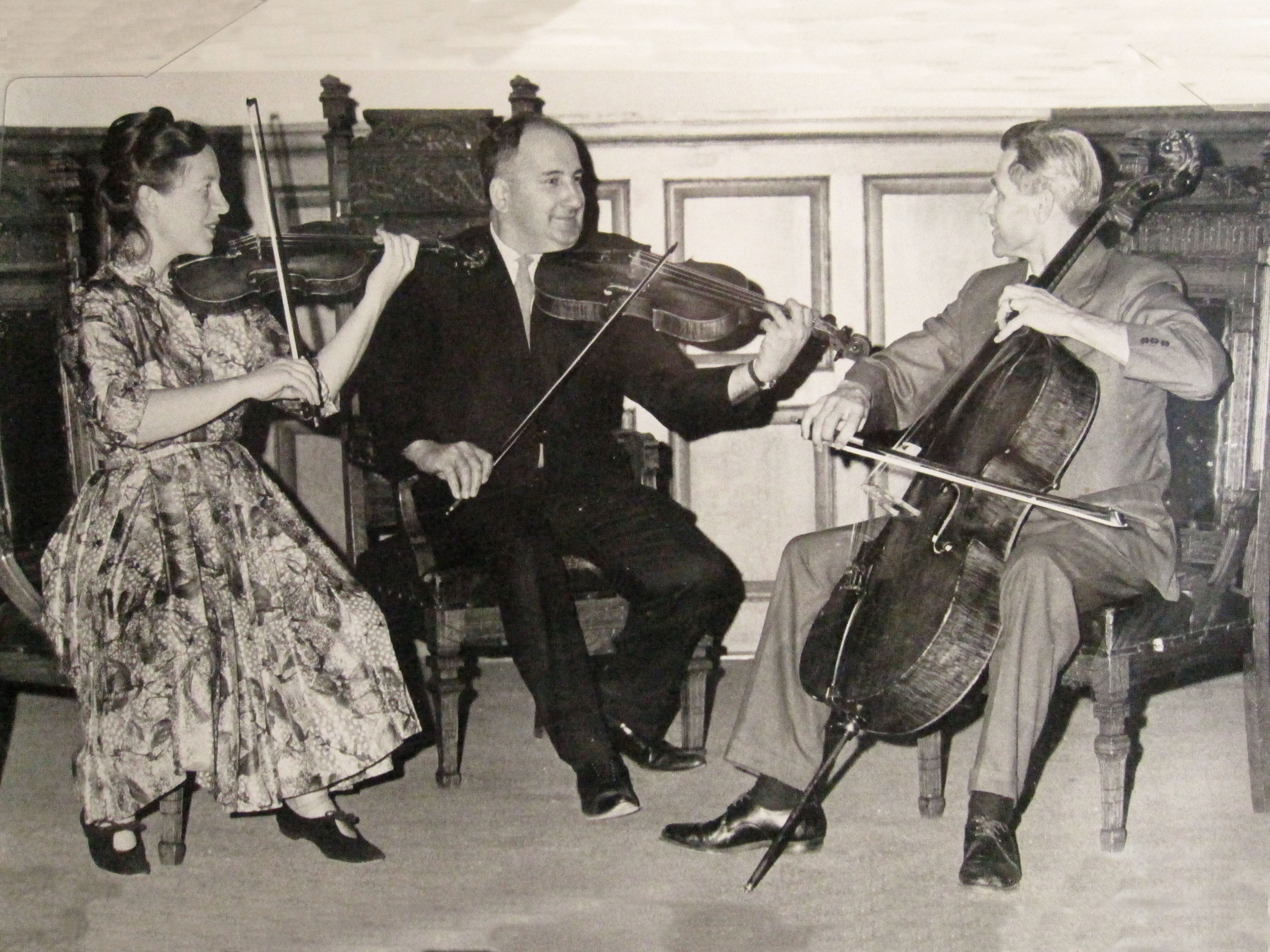
Priscilla and Gunther Paetsch playing trios with J. Boratgis

He was a founding member and cellist of the string trio called the Sebastian Players, which included Jim Boratgis on the viola and Priscilla Paetsch on the violin. Paetsch was appointed "visiting professor of cello" at the Colorado College during 1970–71 and 1978–79. He taught as instructor in the Strings from 1972–73. He also taught cello privately at his home, "Cosmic Heights," in Colorado Springs.

He played as soloist in the premiere performance of the Chamber Soloists of Colorado Springs conducted by Charles Ansbacher, playing the Boccherini Cello Concerto in B flat Major on 30 October 1970 in the Colorado Springs Fine Arts Center.

== Scientific work ==
In 1969 Paetsch invented defibrillators and temperature control devices for truck refrigeration. He also sold mutual funds and water conditioners. As president and general manager of the firm American Instrumentation Corporation, he developed and produced scientific test instruments that were to be used in supersensitive temperature and humidity control devices. These included gun detection devices and new concepts for burglar alarm and fire alarm systems. In cooperation with the Federal grassland studies, he developed a plant growth chamber for photosynthesis measurements, together with an automatic solid state multi-channel gas separator to study gas emissions from plants under natural, yet precisely controlled conditions. Among other biological and physiological instruments ready for production was the first solid state laboratory stimulator to study nerve potentials and intercellular potentials of cardiac cells for physiological research, pacemakers for heart stimulators, cardiac defibrillators and micro electrode pullers for making both glass micro-electrodes with points from 1 to 3 microns and micro-glass tips for embryo-logical research.

== Children ==
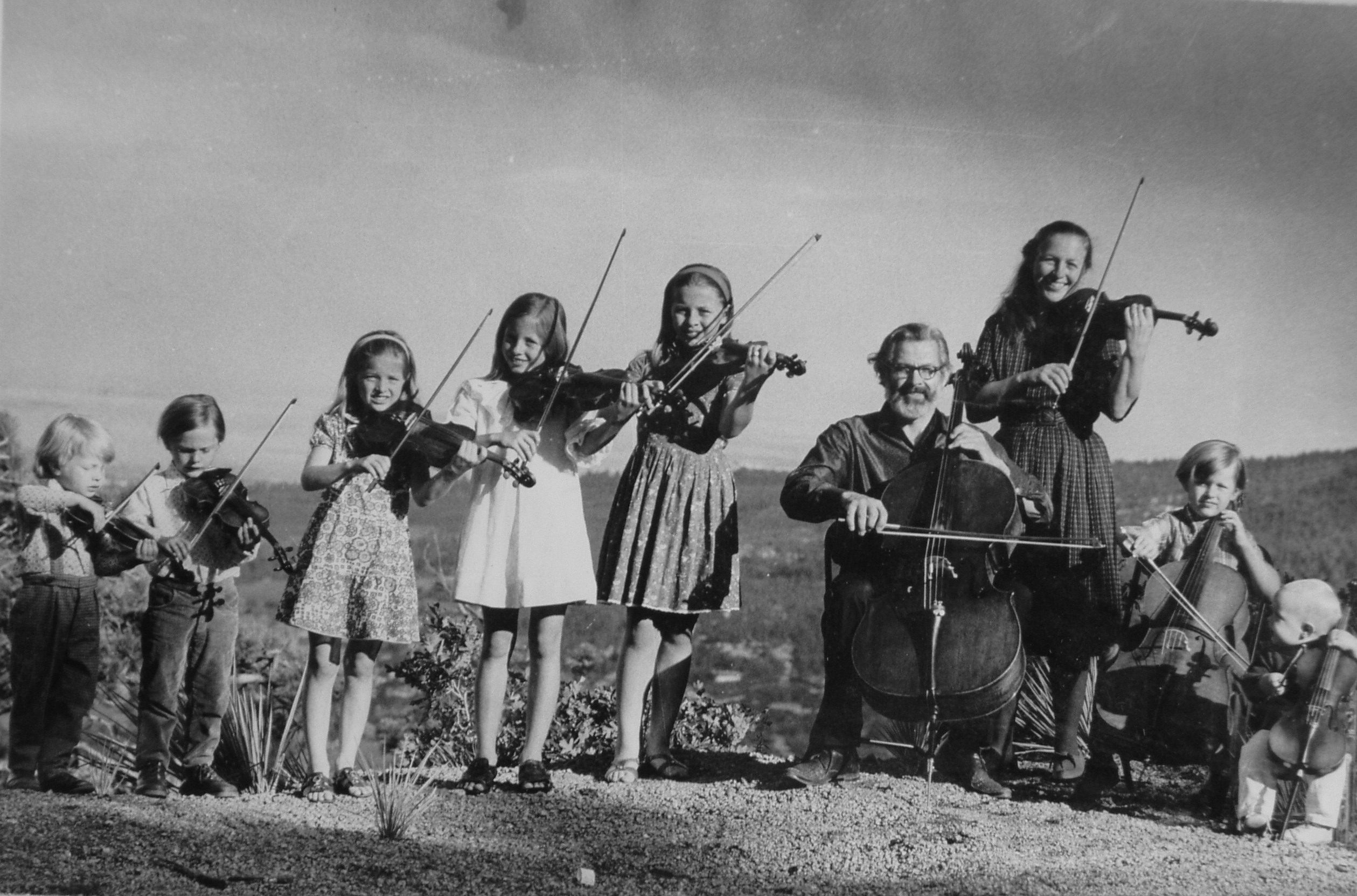
Paetsch family in Colorado Springs in 1972

Paetsch had seven children in eleven years (1960–1971). His first child, Phebe Verena Paetsch, was born in 1960 in Denver, Colorado. Michaela Modjeska Paetsch was born in 1961 in Colorado Springs, as were Brigitte McClure Paetsch in 1963, Johann Sebastian Paetsch in 1964, Christian Friedeman Paetsch in 1966, Engelbert Raphael Paetsch in 1968, and Siegmund Amedeus Paetsch in 1971.

Not only were Gunther and Priscilla professional musicians, but their seven children (three girls and four boys) all learned to play string instruments as well. They eventually formed their own nine-piece group called the Paetsch Family Chamber Music Ensemble. With this group, he and Priscilla taught, rehearsed, and performed with their children most of the chamber music from duos to nonets in and throughout the Colorado area.

Five of the siblings are now professional musicians. Michaela, the second oldest, broke new ground by joining the Colorado Springs Symphony Orchestra at age 13, making her the youngest member ever. At one time, there were five Paetsch family members playing alongside each other in the orchestra. Michaela and her mother Priscilla shared a music stand. Johann, the fourth oldest and oldest son, joined the Colorado Springs Symphony when he was 13, as its youngest cellist ever. Brigitte, the third child, also joined soon after to play in the violin section.

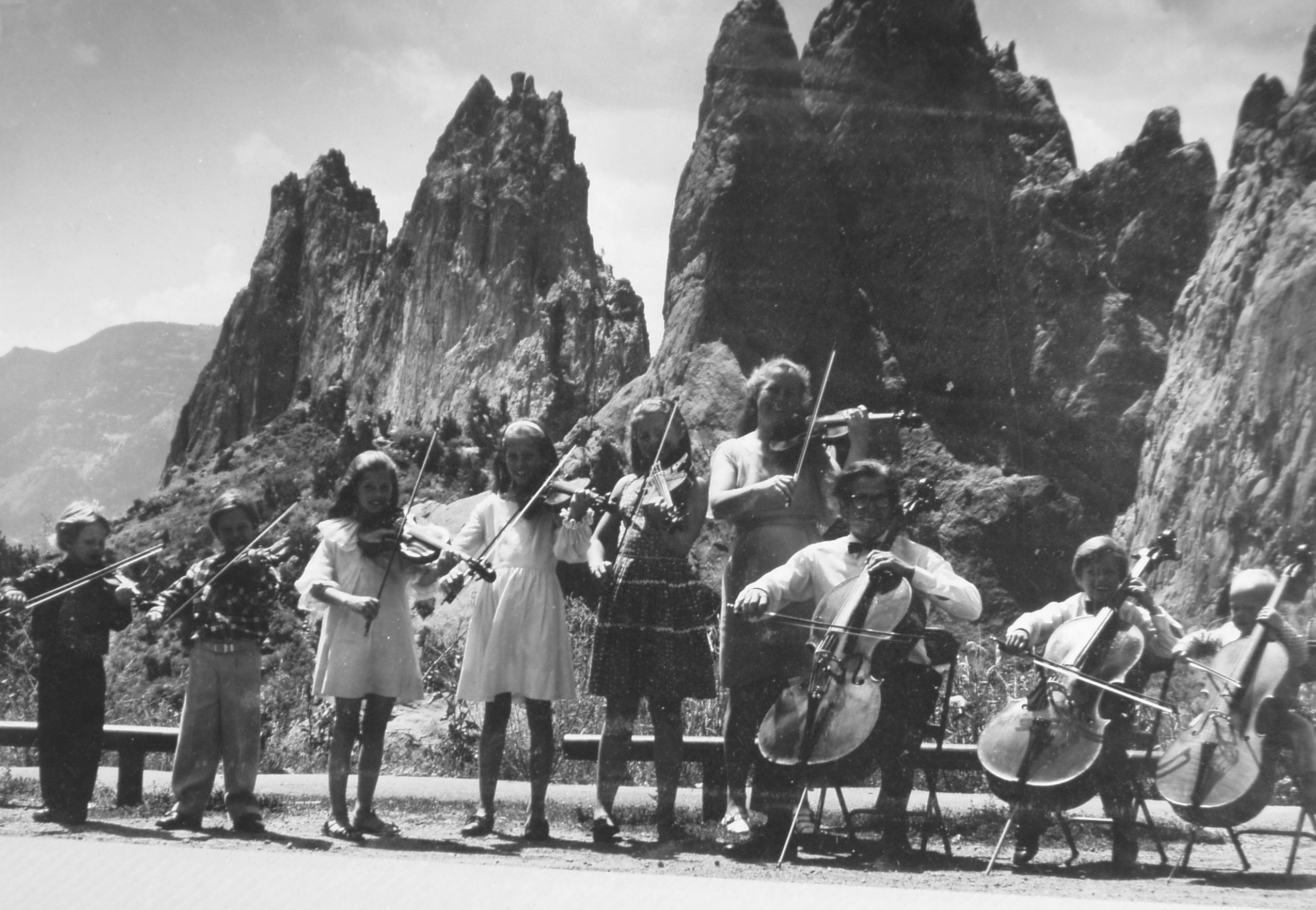
Paetsch Family Chamber Music Ensemble in 1973

The Paetsch Family Chamber Music Ensemble has performed classical music for thousands of Coloradans throughout the state, and especially for the residents of Colorado Springs, including thousands of school children since they were big enough to hold an instrument. The ensemble gave concerts for fund-raising projects and to the community in the Penrose Public Library, in the Fine Arts Centre, for the Ute Symphony Guild, on television, for numerous churches and civic organizations, and for the City of Colorado Springs in its celebration of Heritage Day at the old courthouse. They also gave the first live presentation of classical music in the history of Colorado Springs on KKFM radio.

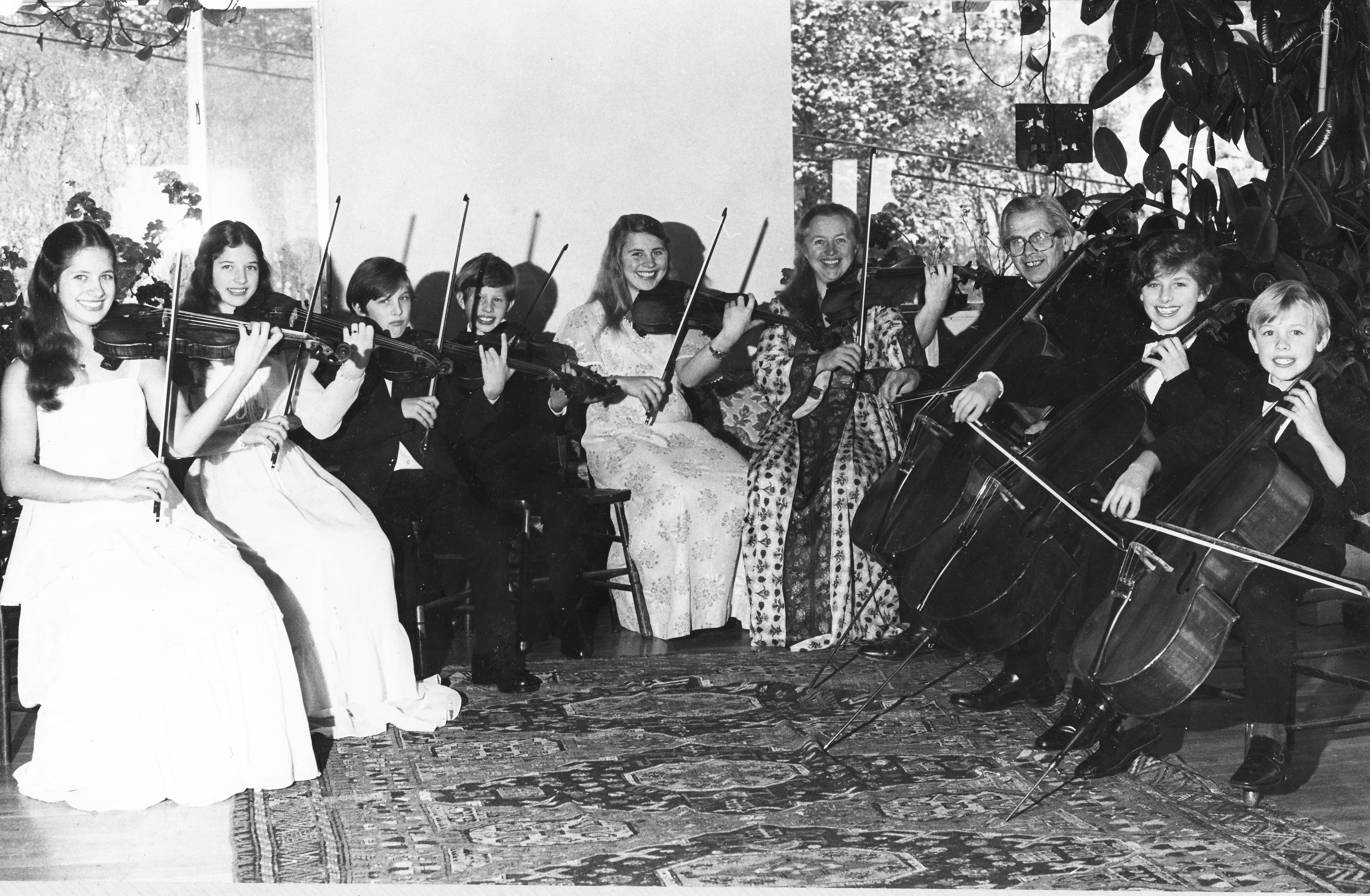
Gunther, Priscilla and their seven children. (Michaela, Brigitte, Christian, Engelbert, Phebe, Johann and Siegmund)

The Paetsch family performed to enthusiastic audiences at the University of Colorado in Boulder, at the Colorado Women's College in Denver, at the Fine Arts Center in Pueblo, with the Jefferson Symphony in Golden, and at Adams State College in Alamosa, where they received standing ovations. In Canon City they gave performances in the new community center, and in Steamboat Springs they gave the opening classical concert in the new performing arts theater. The Rocky Mountain News wrote that "one had to be amazed, that everything was performed so well. The audience responded with a standing ovation before intermission. The group had won the hearts of the audience." The Pueblo Chieftain wrote: "The Paetsch Family is truly gifted in terms of discipline, talent and the desire to give of themselves. It is amazing to see members of a family who have learned to play together with total accuracy and sensitivity." In recognition of their services to the community the family was nominated for the American Musical Family Award given by the American Music Conference.

At one time, the name "Paetsch" was the biggest name in classical music in Colorado Springs... and the most numerous. Gunther and Priscilla Paetsch played cello and violin, respectively, for the Colorado Springs Symphony Orchestra. They, at home, for and with their seven children, formed a string ensemble that took classical music all over the city. They played concerts three times a day for weeks for schools, for nursing homes, for retirement villages, and for hospitals, playing over 300 concerts some years. The children's teachers were not so happy about them missing so much school.

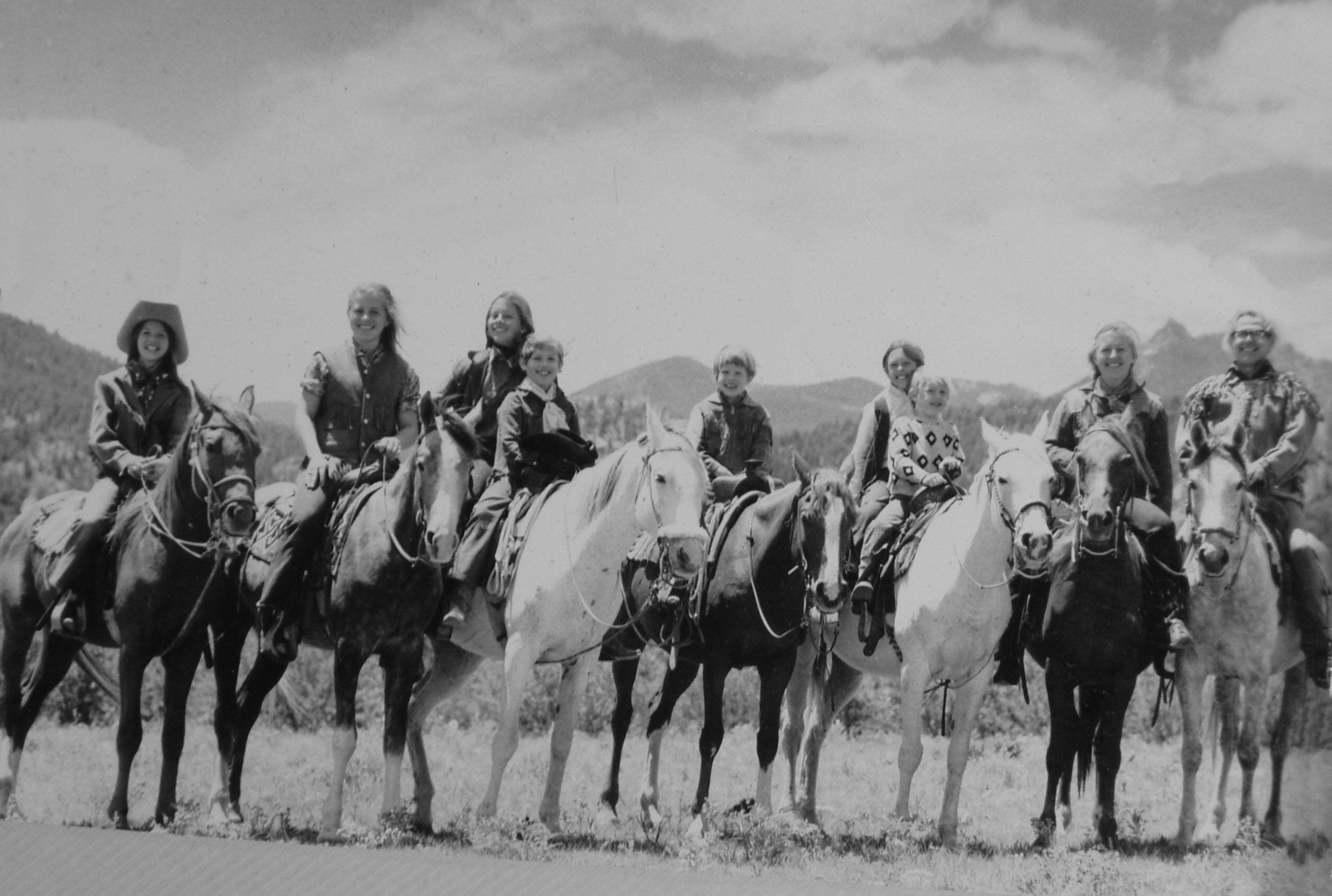
Paetsch Family on their Arabian horses in Colorado Springs

Günther and Priscilla built their house on the west side of Colorado Springs (in upper Skyway) in 1967 and called it "Cosmic Heights". They lived there with their five children at that time. It was, and is, a beautiful house with an unforgettable view overlooking the city.

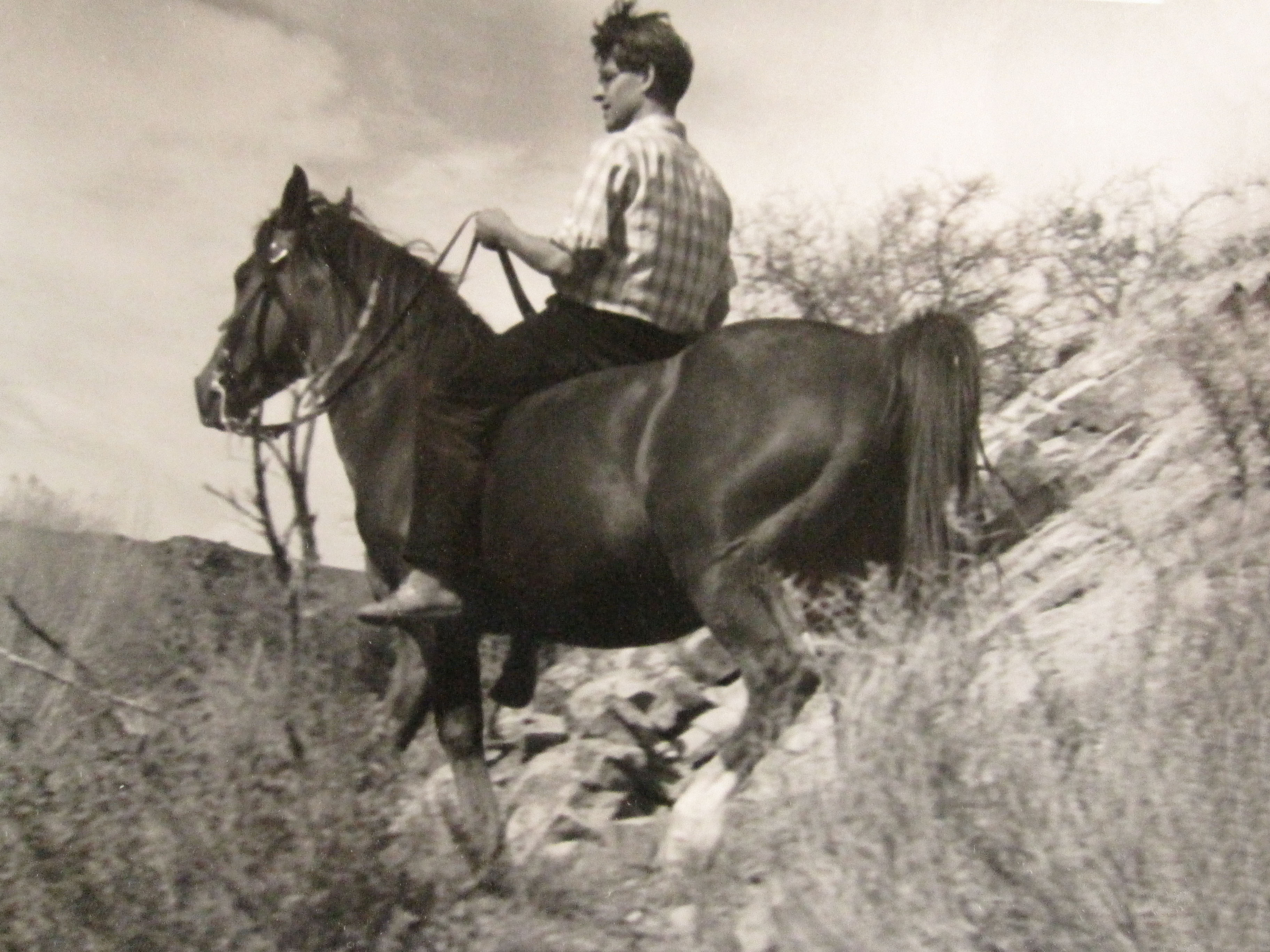
Gunther Paetsch riding an Arabian horse bareback

They also raised and trained purebred registered Arabian horses of Polish bloodlines for pleasure. Most of these Arabians were born at their house, and at one time the Paetsches had as many as 11 horses. They also raised purebred German Shepherd dogs (a litter each year).

Gunther was also an photographer. He did all the development and enlarging of negatives and prints in his own darkroom in the basement of Cosmic Heights, and his photos were often published in magazines and newspapers. He was ahead of the times, and as many people were schooled in a very formal environment where it was only to call the elders by their last names, he wanted to be called Gunther.

In 1994, he retired playing the cello in the Colorado Springs Symphony Orchestra, now known as the Colorado Springs Philharmonic Orchestra, for health reasons (he acquired pneumonia and severe chronic fibrosis of the lungs). He died at the age of 67 on 30 April 1997 in Colorado Springs.

Priscilla Paetsch recently retired from the Colorado Springs Philharmonic.

== Paetsch family tree ==
Friedrich PAETSCH (b. 1723)	Sophia Louisa GAMMERT (b. 1730)
Gottlieb Heinrich PAETSCH (b. 1763); Königsberg, East Prussia	Maria Elisabeth WENDT (b. 1769)
Johann Friedrich PAETSCH; 1794-1855; Königsberg, East Prussia	Dorothea EHRENHEIM; 1791-1873; Königsberg, East Prussia
Johann Gustav Heinrich PAETSCH; 1827-1871; Königsberg, East Prussia	Maria Mattilde Wilhelmine BOCKELMANN (b. 1828); Königsberg, East Prussia
Bruno Henri PAETSCH; 1867–1948; Königsberg, East Prussia	Magdalene Anna Solome GÖBEL; 1869–1918; Stuttgart, Germany
Heinrich Karl Willy PAETSCH; 1892–1970; Stuttgart, Germany	Helene Marie MATT; 1889–1942; Stuttgart, Germany
Günther Johannes PAETSCH; 1929–1997; Stuttgart, Germany	Priscilla McClure JOHNSON; 1931-2017; Evanston, IL
Phebe Verena PAETSCH; 1960; Denver, CO	Michaela Modjeska PAETSCH; 1961-2023; Colorado Springs, CO	Klaus Andreas NEFTEL; 1945-2024; Biel, Switzerland	Brigitte McClure PAETSCH; 1963; Colorado Springs, CO	Edward Wygant GRAY; 1963; Colorado Springs, CO	Johann Sebastian PAETSCH; 1964; Colorado Springs, CO	Yoko MIYAGAWA 水谷川陽子; 1964; Berlin, Germany	Christian Friedeman PAETSCH; 1966; Colorado Springs, CO	Caroline Leonore WYLIE; 1967	Engelbert Raphael PAETSCH; 1968; Colorado Springs, CO	Siegmund Amadeus PAETSCH; 1971; Colorado Springs, CO	Christine Louise MARTIN; 1970
Anna Nora NEFTEL; 1992; Bern, Switzerland	Ingrid Marie GRAY; 1990; New Haven, CT	Erika Kate GRAY; 1996; Charlotte, NC	Edward Johannes GRAY; 1997; Charlotte, NC	Raphaela Shauna PAETSCH; 1996; Lugano, Switzerland	Valentina Serena PAETSCH; 1998; Lugano, Switzerland	Dominic Günther Atsuki PAETSCH; 2001; Lugano, Switzerland	Jessica Rose Adriana PAETSCH; 1993; Denver, CO	Chloe Nichole PAETSCH (b. 1998)
