= Lincoln Grammar School =

Historic school in Lincoln, England

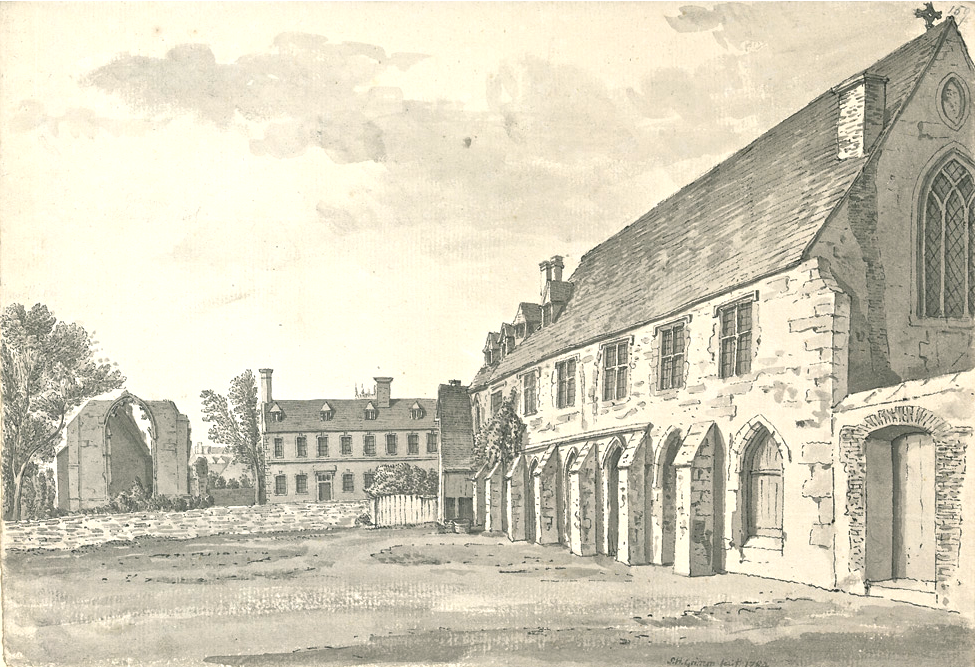

Location
- Greyfriars, Lincoln; Lincoln, Lincolnshire; England
- Coordinates: 53°13′44.73″N 0°32′13.72″W

Information
- Type: Grammar School
- Established: 1584- an amalgamation of the City Free School and the Cathedral Chapter School
- Founders: Lincoln City Council & Dean Chapter of Lincoln Cathedral
- Closed: 1974
- Alumni: Colonel Hutchinson; Governor Thomas Pownall

Lincoln Grammar School or Lincoln Free School was formed as the result of the amalgamation of the Lincoln City Free School and the Lincoln Chapter Grammar School. The amalgamation occurred in January 1584, but the two schools may have been effectively working as single school from 1560. In 1574 Lincoln City Corporation had reached an agreement with Robert Monson who was donating the Greyfriars for use as a Grammar School. This was to replace an older City Free school, which had been in scholegate. The exact location of this Free school is uncertain, but scholegate probably refers to Danesgate, but other evidence suggests that the earlier school was close to St Rumbold's church.

The school moved to the Greyfriars in Lincoln probably in 1575. In 1861 the Grammar school started to move to a new site on Upper Lindum Terrace, to the east of Lincoln Cathedral. The move was completed by 1900, but the site became too small and a new school was built on Wragby Road in Lincoln. The name of the school was changed to Lincoln School in 1912. In 1974 the school became a comprehensive school and merged with other Lincoln schools. The name was changed to Lincoln Christ's Hospital School

== The School in the Greyfriars ==
The City Free school was moved to the upper storey of the Greyfriars building, probably in 1575, under the mastership of Mr John Plumtre. Plumtre appears to have been previously employed by the cathedral. In 1576 the City appointed an Usher for the Lower School. Negotiations between the Dean and Chapter and the city were taking place in 1580 to unite the Cathedral School and the City Free School. This took place in 1584. The Dean and Chapter would pay the salary of the Master of the Upper School and the city the salary of Usher of the Lower School. The Master of the School had to be a Master of Arts of either Oxford or Cambridge Universities. The first master to be appointed under this regime was William Temple, who had attended Eton and King's College, Cambridge. He only remained a short time at the School before becoming Sir Philip Sidney's secretary. Then in 1598 he became Robert Devereux, 2nd Earl of Essex's deputy in Ireland, at the time of Tyrone's Rebellion. He established himself as a logician and Ramist philosopher. He returned to Ireland in 1609, when he became Provost of Trinity College, Dublin, which he reformed along the lines of an Oxford or Cambridge College and became a member of the Irish Parliament. He became Sir William Temple in 1617.

In 1589 the City Council decided to store gunpowder and matches, as well as armour, in a chamber in the undercroft under schoolroom. Fortunately for the pupils no explosion occurred! After that the undercroft was used as a Spinning or Jersey School for the unemployed, a use for which it continued until 1831.

=== 17th Century ===
During the early 17th century many scholars were sent from the school to study at Cambridge colleges. In 1622 the Rev John Clarke became the master and he continued through English Civil War until 1651. Clarke was appointed at about the age of 26 and had previously been the tutor to the sons of the Earl of Lindsey. It was under Clarke that two of the school's most famous pupils were educated. These were Colonel John Hutchinson (1615–1664) and Colonel Sir Francis Thornhagh or Thornhaugh (1617–1648). Both were Members of Parliament and Parliamentarian leaders. Hutchinson was Governor of Nottingham Castle and signed King Charles’ death warrant. Thornhaugh was High Sheriff Nottinghamshire and was killed at a battle at Chorley in Lancashire in the Second Civil War.

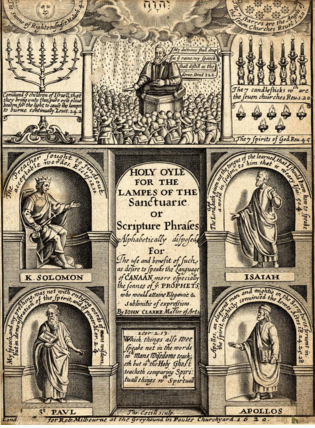
Title page of John Clarke's Holy Oyle for the Lampes of the Sanctuarie

Clarke is noted for his publications on educational and religious subjects. The first of these, published in 1628, was Transitionum formulae, a book which was intended to teach his pupils skills in oratory and writing based on Latin and Greek texts. This book, published in London, was to be re-titled Formulae Orationes went through seven editions, the last being in 1672. In the forth edition of 1632 he notes that 7000 copies had been sold. He followed this in 1630 with Holy Oyle for the Lampes of the Sanctuarie. a concordance of quotations from the King James Bible, published in 1611. In 1633 he published an edition of Erasmus and Dux Grammaticus. This was followed in by Phraseologia puerilis, Anglo–Latina.(1638) and Paroemiologia Anglo–Latina.(1639). Lucy Hutchinson, the wife of Colonel Hutchinson, records that her husband thought Clarke a master very famous for learning and piety, but such a supercilious pedant, and so conceited of his owne pedantique forms, that he gave Mr. Hutchinson a disgust of him, so that he profited very little there.

=== 18th Century and early 19th Century ===
During the 18th Century the school would appear to have been relatively successful and the school was sending pupils regularly to Cambridge University and developed a strong connection with Magdalene College, Cambridge where two Fellowships and scholarships were reserved for pupils from the school. A former pupil, Daniel Cosgrove Waterland, became Master of Magdalene College in 1714. In 1724 when John Goodhall was appointed master, the City added an additional £30 to the salary of £20 already being paid by the Dean and Chapter. Notable scholars under Goodall were Thomas Pownall, Governor of the Province of Massachusetts Bay and his brother John Pownall, secretary to the Board of Trade, and also John Sibthorp who became Sherardian Professor of Botany at the Oxford University.

There is a lengthy description of the School under Mr Hewthwaite, who was the master from 1765 to 1791, by Henry Digby Beste in his Personal and Literary Memorials. Beste, who was at the school from 1776 to 1783, did not particularly enjoy his time at the school complaining about the floggings that took place and the lack narrow curriculum that was taught, being mainly Latin and Greek. Beste provides a description of the school: To get up to the schoolroom in the Greyfriars was up some broken stone- steps...... to the vast arched door-way that opened into the school. The door was too heavy for infant hands to move with ease.... inside was placed a lumbering, ugly pulpit, into which, at the commencement and end of the labours and sorrows of each day, the head master retired, while that most important of all animals, the head boy, read a few collects, our matins and vespers. Below this pulpit, and so near to it as only to admit the master's chair between them, stood a large oblong table. ..... the table was now covered by a green cloth; and at its hither side, opposite to the Windsor arm-chair, was a long bench, on which the boys of the first two classes had the privilege of being seated during their attempts to translate Homer and Horace into the Lincolnshire dialect... On each side was a range of what might be called either desks or pews, The scholars were those sons of citizens who came to get a little useless Latin before being bound to an useful trade. Beste admits prying into the ushers and master's desks. we lifted up the cover of the usher's desk: we beheld a numero of the Gentleman's Magazine, some other new publication, and a nail- knife. Besides light reading, and filing his nails, Mr. C— had another source of amusement, during the intervals of the classes or even during their recitations, in picking the powder out of his hair. In Mr Hewthwaite's desk they found what seemed to announce him as more elevated in learning as well as in station; -a book in an unknown character, which one of the bigger boys informed us was Hebrew.....We examined, with thrilling curiosity, the instruments of torture kept in each of these desks : we applauded the ingenious mercy with which the ferulas or canes were by their thickness accommodated to the ages of the sufferers in the respective schools. He also describes the graffiti, still on the walls of the Greyfriars We tried hard to decypher some of the names of many generations of school-boys, inscribed on the walls or engraved with no better tool than a pocket-knife on the seats and desks. Fame, even within a prison, is glory to him whose thoughts range not beyond it. The head- master would not permit any white-washing or reparation, by which any of these names might be obliterated.

In 1792 the Rev John Carter, who previously had been the Usher, was appointed master. Carter was a notable antiquarian recording Roman discoveries in Lincoln and a good classical scholar who published a translation of Seneca's Tragedies. In 1793 The City purchased for £600 two houses on the opposite side of Broadgate to the Greyfriars for the Master and the boarders. These fine Georgian buildings were unfortunately demolished in 1972. Carter was also the Perpetual Curate of the nearby St Swithin's Church on Free School Lane, which was re-built in 1801 during his curacy.

At this time the summer holidays at the school started on the Friday before Midsummer and lasted for a month. There was also an annual Potation or Speech day which in 1802 was in the week before the summer holidays, when speeches were delivered by the young gentlemen, who acquitted themselves to the great satisfaction of the numerous audience. This was followed by a gathering of the Old Boys of the school, who held a dinner in either the Saracens Head or the Reindeer Inns.

=== The Victorian period ===
During this period the history of the Grammar school becomes very complex and the educational standards declined. The Greyfriars became an increasing unsuitable building for the school. Sheep Market square to the south of the Greyfriars was vacated with the opening of the Cattle Market on Monks Road and the building of the new St Swithin's Church on the Square overshadowed and cut off the light from the Greyfriars. The Rev John Carter resigned in 1820 and was replaced by the Rev. James Adcock as master. In 1837 the Corporation turned their attention towards extending usefulness that ancient institution. The second mastership has been temporally entrusted Mr. Robert Drury, for the express purpose of trying to establish how far it will meet the wishes of the inhabitants to adopt system of education not exclusively of classical tendency. This was a time when Lincoln's commercial and engineering economy was starting to grow and education in Latin and Greek was no longer a priority. The school was visited in 1839 by the Commissioners for Inquiry for Charities who reported that Mr Sandon, who had replaced Mr Drury as usher or second master of the commercial school had greatly reduced the number of pupils in the Lower School and they were compelled most reluctantly to listen to a long series of charges brought against Mr Sandon, respecting his ill-treatment of the children. Mr Sandon was promptly dismissed by the corporation. The corporation now appointed an English master in charge of the Lower School to broaden the scope of the subjects taught, while the Rev James Adcock continued to teach Latin and Greek. The "English" school was extremely successful and by 1839 numbered 140 boys, in contrast with 6 in the Upper School. The Master was now forced to retreat to the Broadgate house, as the Lower School took up all of the upper storey of the Greyfriars. Additionally it was found in 1849 that the Usher or English master had become a Wesleyan and the Rev James Adcock was forced to resign as he was failing to supervise the school.

In 1850, following the resignation of Rev. Mr Adcock, a new agreement was reached between the Corporation and the Cathedral Chapter. The funding for the school increased. French, Mathematics, English Literature, History and Geography were now to be taught and the new master appointed was the Rev George Foster Simpson, former "Rector and Master of the Royal Grammar School of Montréal" and first principal of the High School of Montreal. However the school was only to further decline and when he died in 1857, there were only 47 boys in the Upper School and 28 in the Lower or English School.

The Rev John Fowler became headmaster. In 1858 surplus funds from the ancient hospitals at Mere and Spital in the Street, which in medieval times had belonged to the Knights Hospitallers were awarded by the Court of Chancery to the Grammar School. Initially the Corporation wished to build a new Master's House on the Sheep Square in front of the Greyfriars. The Dean and Chapter objected and instead the new Headmaster's House and boarding block was built in 1861 on Upper Lindum Road. This was designed by the Lincoln architects Bellamy and Hardy in the Ruskinian Gothic style. The old Master's house on the other side of the Broadgate was sold in 1862

In order to provide more room for the pupils in 1858 the council gave notice to the Lincoln Mechanics' Institute to vacate the undercroft of the Greyfriars. The Mechanics' Institute had been established in the undercroft after it was vacated by the Spinning or Jersey School in 1831, and provided technical classes for apprentices and artisans working in Lincoln's growing engineering and commercial sector. The Mechanics' Institute then moved to the Buttermarket adjacent to St Peter at Arches Church in 1862. In 1864 the Schools Enquiry Commission found that were 55 boys in the Upper School, of whom 14 were boarders paying forty to fifty guineas a year and there were 65 boys in the lower or "English" school.

The master of the school, the Rev John Fowler, was now sending his most promising pupils to Shrewsbury School. These included Henry Whitehead Moss who became headmaster of Shrewsbury School and Evelyn Abbott, a notable classical scholar. There was considerable criticism of the school in the local press and it was pointed out that the Grammar school was now little more than a preparatory school for the larger public schools. As a result, in 1871 the school was divided into a Classical and Modern School and these were now split into Upper and Lower Schools. After 1875 the Rev A Babington replaced the Rev John Fowler as the master of the Classical School.

== Classical School and the move to Upper Lindum Terrace ==
Lincoln Grammar School – Classical School
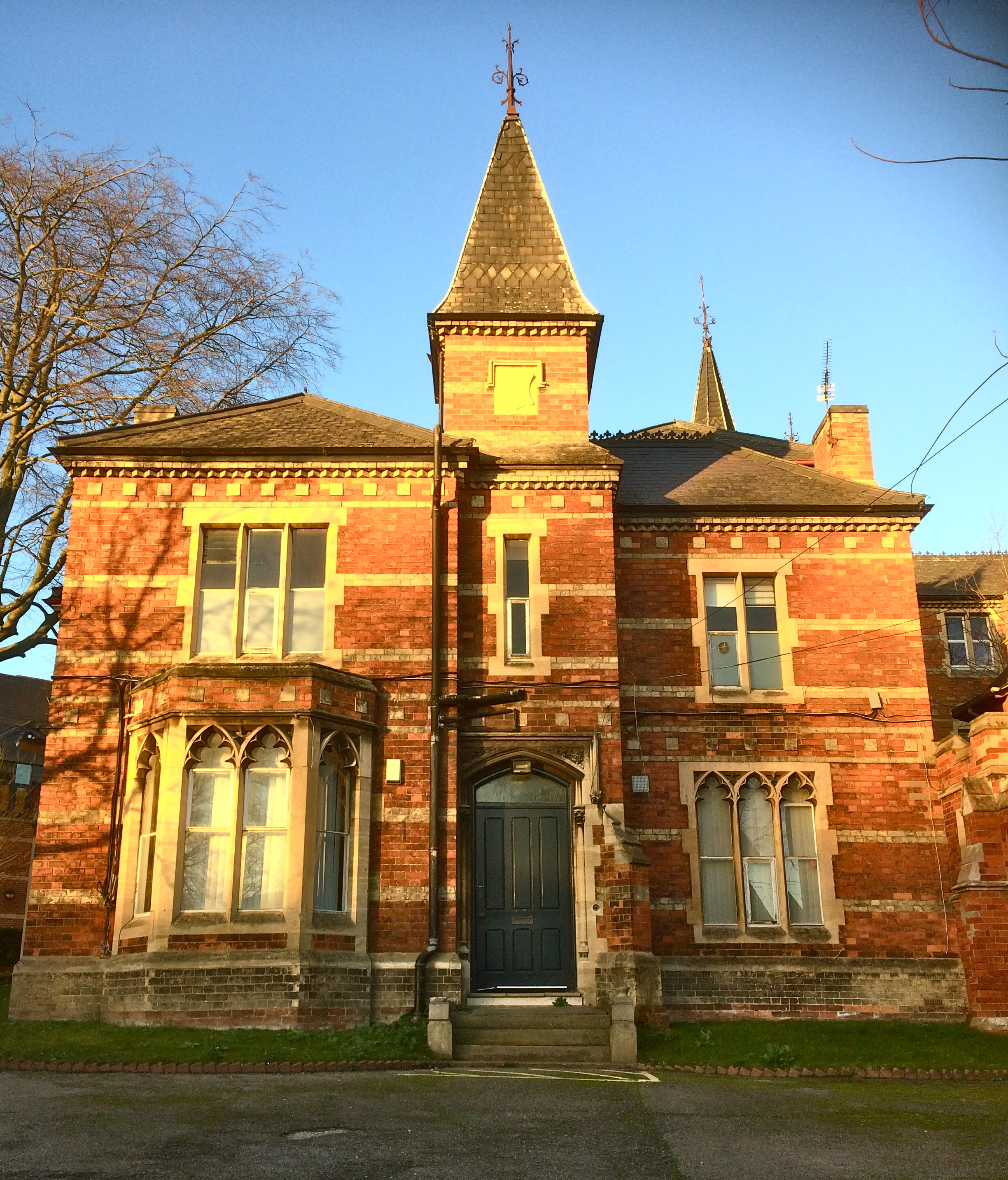

Location
- Upper Lindum Street; Lincoln

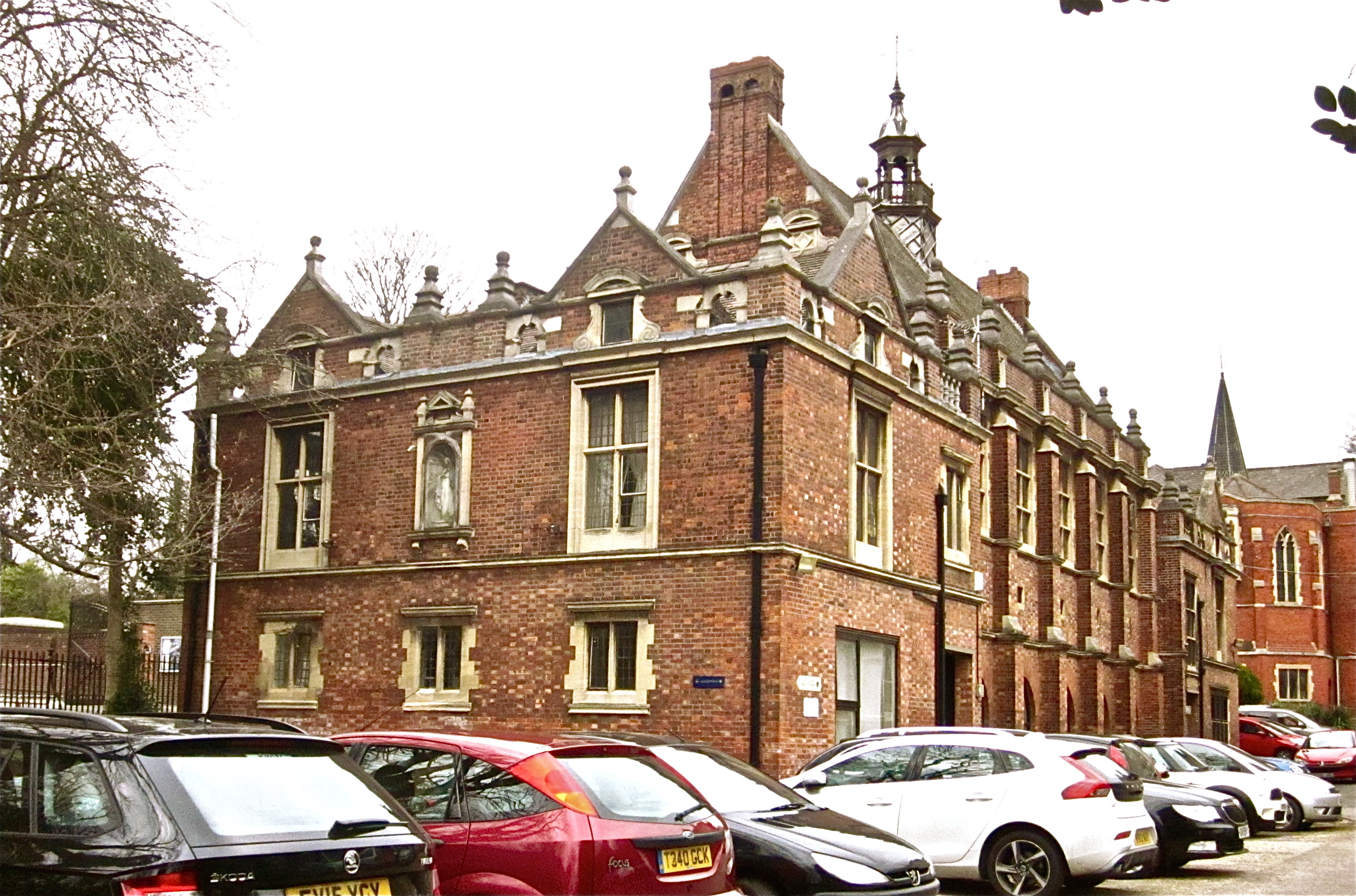
Lincoln Grammar School 1883/4

A new scheme for running the Classical and Middle schools was in approved in 1883. Money was made available from the former Lincoln Blue Coat School. The Ecclesiastical Commissioners provided £10,000 for new buildings on Upper Lindum Terrace. These were designed by the Lincoln architect William Watkins in 1883–84, when the Classical School moved to the site. These consisted of a traditional school hall with a classroom block A new headmaster, William Weekes Fowler was appointed in 1883 as head of the Classical School with five assistant masters. However the Classical School did not flourish, largely because of the competition with other schools in Lincoln, including a Technical School run by the corporation.

=== Middle school ===
The Middle school continued in the Greyfriars under the Rev Robert Markham, who was appointed in 1875. In 1876 there were 100 boys in the school and it was reported that they were well taught in Latin, English and French and were receiving a sound commercial education. With the reforms of 1883 the Middle School occupied all of the Greyfriars and 30 scholarships were provided for pupils from elementary schools in Lincoln area to be educated in the Middle School. There were a further 12 scholarships for pupils to progress from the Middle School to the Classical School, and was noted that those pupils originally from the Middle School were winning all the scholarships to universities.

=== The Re-amalgamation of the schools in 1898 ===
By 1898 it was considered that the split between the Classical and the Middle school had not worked and the two Schools were re-united on the Upper Lindum Terrace site. The Classical School buildings had been extended in 1897 and the Rev. Robert Markham retired due to ill health. The new scheme was agreed in 1900. The Greyfriars was vacated and was converted in 1905/6 into the Lincoln City and County Museum. It was immediately realised that there was insufficient space for the Grammar School to develop on the Upper Lindum Terrace site and in 1901 a 24-acre (9.7 ha) site was purchased on Wragby Road for a new grammar school building. The new Grammar school was completed in 1906, and the Upper Lindum Road buildings became the St Joseph Convent School and is now part of the Lincoln Minster School.

== Wragby Road ==
Lincoln Grammar School
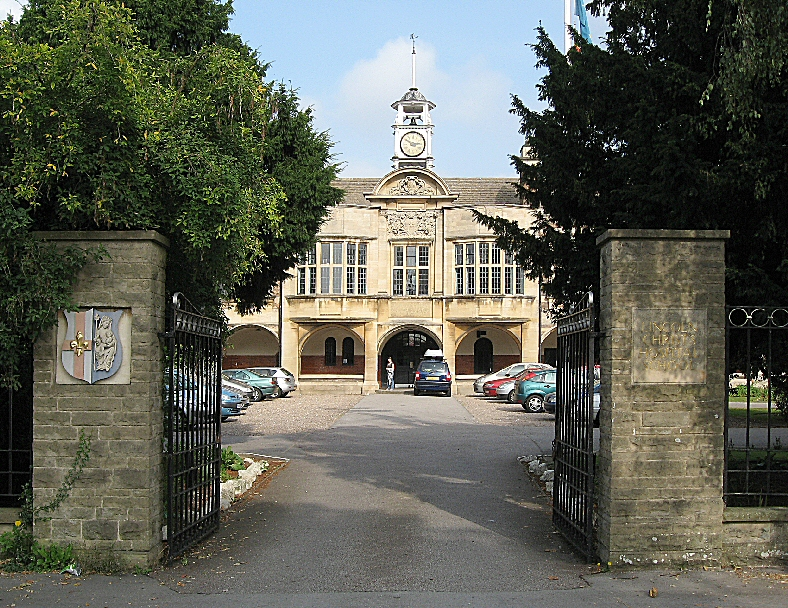
- Wragby Road 1905-1974

The buildings were designed in 1905 by the architect Leonard Stokes in a Tudoresque or Jacobean style. A design by Charles Voysey was rejected as being too severe - a notable loss for Lincoln.

In 1912 the school changed its name to Lincoln School. During the First World War, the building was requisitioned by the War Office to create the 4th Northern General Hospital, a facility for the Royal Army Medical Corps to treat military casualties. During the War the school continued in temporary buildings adjacent to Lincoln Hospital on Lindum Terrace. In September 1974 the City of Lincoln abolished selective education. The city's two grammar schools, Christ's Hospital Girls' High School and Lincoln School, were merged with two secondary modern schools, St Giles's Secondary Modern School for Boys and Myle Cross Secondary Modern School for Girls. The school is now known as Lincoln Christ's Hospital School.

== Notable scholars ==
Pupils who attended Lincoln Grammar School while at the Greyfriars

- Colonel John Hutchinson (1615–1664) was an English M.P. from 1648 to 1653 and in 1660. He was a Puritan leader, Governor of Nottingham Castle and fought in the English Civil War. As a member of the high court of justice in 1649 he was 13th of 59 Commissioners to sign the death-warrant of King Charles I. In 1663, he was accused of involvement in the Farnley Wood Plot, and died in prison.
- Colonel Sir Francis Thornhagh or Thornhaugh (1617–1648) Parliamentarian soldier, High Sheriff of Nottinghamshire and MP. During the Second Civil War in 1648, served under Cromwell at the siege of Pembroke Castle and when a Scottish army under the Duke of Hamilton marched south, Thornhagh marched under Oliver Cromwell's command to meet them. He was killed near Chorley during mopping up operations after the Battle of Preston.
- John Disney (1677–1730), churchman. His writing mostly relating to the Societies for the Reformation of Manners was prolific, but he also found time to research and publish The Genealogy of the most Serene and Illustrious House of Brunswick-Lunenburgh, the present Royal Family of Great Britain in 1714.
- Daniel Cosgrove Waterland (1683–1740) was an English theologian. He became Master of Magdalene College, Cambridge in 1714, Chancellor of the Diocese of York in 1722, and Archdeacon of Middlesex in 1730.
- Peniston Booth, FRS (1681–1765), Dean of Windsor.

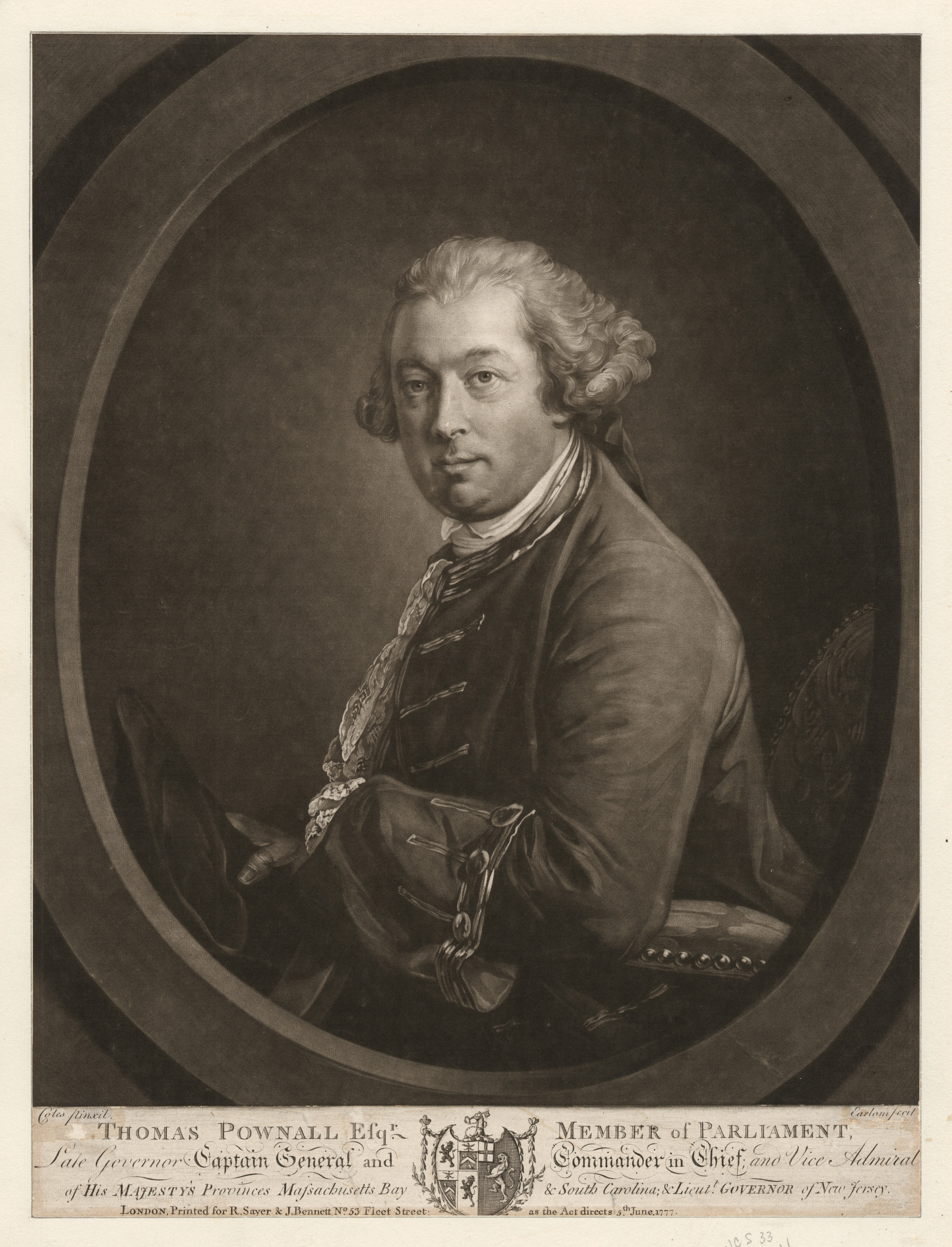
Thomas Pownall Esqr., member of Parliament, late Governor Captain General and Commander in Chief, and Vice Admiral of his Majesty's Provinces Massachusetts Bay and South Carolina

- Thomas Pownall (1722–1805). Important figure in the history of the United States. Fellow of the Royal Society (1775) and the Society of Antiquaries M.P. for Tregoney, [Cornwall], 1767–74; for Minehead, [Somerset], 1774–1779. Educated at Lincoln Grammar School during the mastership of John Goodall. with his brother John who was secretary to the Board of Trade. Governor of the Province of Massachusetts Bay, 1757–59. Returned to England, 1760 Noted for his opposition to George III and supporting the Independence of the American States. Wrote extensively on Roman Archaeology, Anthropology, and Economics. Also wrote one of the earliest pamphlets advocating the abolition of the slave trade, and a pioneering work on the Gulf Stream. Professor Bryony Orme remarks that he is perhaps one of the most neglected of our early antiquaries, and undeservedly so. An accomplished artist and many of his drawings were engraved as book illustrations.
- John Sibthorp From 1747 to 1784, was Sherardian Professor of Botany at the University of Oxford
- Richard Watson (1781–1833) British Methodist theologian, a leading figure of Wesleyan Methodism in the early 19th century.
- John Taylor (1781–1864) Educated at Lincoln and Retford Grammar Schools. Publisher, essayist, and writer. The publisher of the poets John Keats and John Clare.

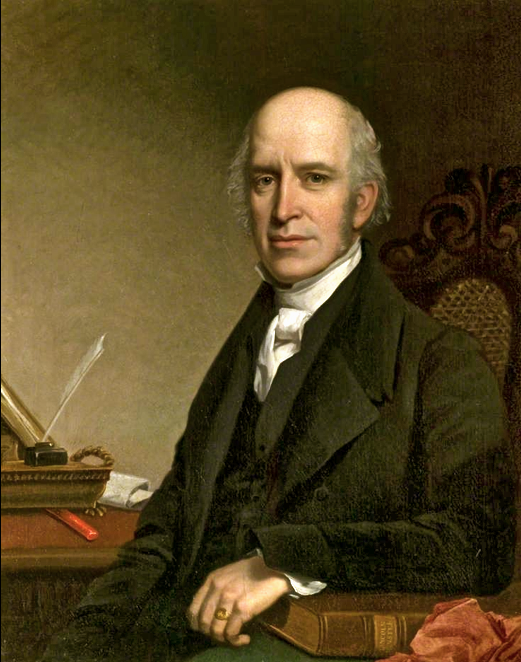
Edward James Willson

- Edward Willson, F.S.A., (1787–1854). Lincoln architect, antiquary, architectural writer, and mayor of Lincoln in 1851–2. Willson wrote Specimens of Gothic Architecture, with illustrations by Auguste Charles Pugin, published in 1821 and 1822 and with Pugin Examples of Gothic Architecture, consisting of Plans, Sections Elevations and Details in 1830 and 1836. His portrait hangs in the Lincoln Guildhall.
- Henry Whitehead Moss (1841–1917) He was educated at Lincoln Grammar School and Shrewsbury. Became headmaster of Shrewsbury School at the age of 25, remaining in the post for forty-two years, until he retired in 1908.
- Evelyn Abbott (1843–1901) was an English classical scholar, born at Epperstone, Nottinghamshire. He was educated at Balliol College, Oxford, where he excelled both academically and in sports, winning the Gaisford Prize for Greek Verse in 1864, but after a fall in 1866 his legs became paralyzed. He managed to graduate in spite of his handicap, and was elected fellow of Balliol in 1874. His best-known work is his History of Greece in three volumes (1888–1900).
- George Francis Carline (1855–1920) watercolour painter of landscapes and portraits.
- William Henry Battle (1855–1936). Attended Lincoln Grammar School and then Haileybury School, Hertfordshire. From 1889 to 1890 he held the title of Hunterian Professor of Surgery and Pathology at the Royal College of Surgeons of England.
- James Ward Usher (1845–1921) art jeweller and philanthropist, Usher was an enthusiastic collector of fine clocks, watches, porcelain and paintings. His personal collection became the basis for the Usher Gallery which was founded after his death using a legacy he left for the purpose
- William Logsdail (1859–1944) English landscape, portrait, and genre painter. He exhibited at the Royal Academy, the Royal Society of British Artists, the Grosvenor Gallery, the New Gallery (London), Notable for his realistic London and Venice scenes and his plein air style.

== Masters of the Grammar School ==
=== At the Lincoln Greyfriars ===
- 1574 William Saunderson
- 1576 Mr Plumtre
- 1585 William Temple. Later secretary to Sir Philip Sidney and Provost of Trinity College, Dublin.
- 1593/4 Mr Nethercotes
- 1597 Mr Mason
- 1601-10 Robert Houghton
- 1616 John Phipps
- 1622-1651 Rev John Clarke M.A. B.D. (Magdalene College Cambridge)
- 1656-1665 Mr Umfrevile
- 1681 Mr Bromsgrove
- 1683 Mr France
- 1663 Mr Gibson
- 1704-1724 Rev Samuel Garmston
- 1724 -1742 Mr John Goodall (St John's College, Cambridge)
- 1742- ?1765 Rev. Mr Rolt
- 1765-91 Rev. John Hewthwaite
- 1792-1821 Rev John Carter
- 1828-50 Rev James Adcock
- 1852–1857: Revd George Foster Simpson, previously the first Rector of the High School of Montreal
- 1857-1875. Rev. John Fowler.

=== Greyfriars and Upper Lindum Terrace ===
- 1857–1875: Revd John Fowler.
- 1875-?1883 Rev A Babington. Headmaster of the Classical School
- 1875-1897 Rev Robert Markham. Headmaster of the Middle School in the Greyfriars
- 1883-1897 William Weekes Fowler. Headmaster of the Lincoln Classical School on Upper Lindum Terrace.
- 1898 -1911 F H Chambers. Head master of Lincoln Grammar School on Upper Lindum Terrace and then on Wragby road.

=== Wragby Road ===
- 1911–1929: Reginald Moxon
- 1929–1937: Charles Edgar Young
- 1937–1957: George Franklin
- 1958–1962: Patrick Martin (later headmaster of Warwick School, 1962–77)
- 1962–1973: John Collins Faull (later headmaster of Tewkesbury School, 1972–?)
- 1973–1974: Arthur Behenna

== Literature ==
- Antram N (revised), Pevsner N & Harris J, (1989), The Buildings of England: Lincolnshire, Yale University Press.
- Cameron K (1985) The place Names of Lincolnshire :Part 1. The County of the City of Lincoln, English Place-Name Society. Vol58.
- Hill, Sir Francis. (1948)Medieval Lincoln, Cambridge University Press, xvii, 487 p.
- Hill, Sir Francis. (1956)Tudor and Stuart Lincoln, Cambridge University Press,
- Hill, Sir Francis. (1966)Georgian Lincoln, Cambridge University Press 1966 pp73–5, 143, 248 &281-2
- Hill, Sir Francis. (1974) Victorian Lincoln. Cambridge University Press. ISBN 0521203341
- Johnson C. and Jones S. (2016) Steep, Strait and High: Ancient Houses of Central Lincoln. Lincoln Record Society, Boydell & Brewer, Woodbridge, pp183–189.
- Leach A.F. (1906), Schools-Lincoln Grammar School in Victoria County History of the County of Lincoln, vol. II (ed. W. Page) 421–443
- Moore N. (2024) Lincoln’s Grammar School that was never built in Walker A (ed) Learning in Lincoln : A History of the City’s Education Buildings. pp. 43–48.
- Padley J.S., (1851) Selections from the Ancient Monastic Ecclesiastical and Domestic edifices of Lincolnshire, Lincoln.
