= Gerhard Friedrich =

German flying ace (1917–1945)

Gerhardt Friedrich
- Born: 16 September 1917; Johannisthal, Kingdom of Prussia
- Died: 16 March 1945 (aged 27); Stuttgart
- Cause of death: Killed in action
- Military career
- Allegiance: Nazi Germany
- Branch: Luftwaffe
- Service years: 1939–1945
- Rank: Major (major)
- Nickname: Gerd
- Units: NJG 1, NJG 4, NJG 6
- Commands: I./NJG 6
- Conflicts: World War II: Eastern Front; North African Campaign
- Awards: Knight's Cross of the Iron Cross

Gerhard "Gerd" Friedrich (16 September 1917 – 16 March 1945) was a Luftwaffe fighter ace of World War II. He was a night fighter ace who scored 30 victories, all recorded at night.

== World War II ==
World War II in Europe began on Friday 1 September 1939 when German forces invaded Poland. Friedrich started his Luftwaffe career as a transport pilot with Kampfgruppe zur besonderen Verwendung 104 (KGr.z.b.v. 104—Fighting Group for Special Use) and participated in the invasion of Crete. (Note: According to Obermaier, Friedrich served in Kampfgruppe zur besonderen Verwendung 106 (KGr.z.b.v. 106—Fighting Group for Special Use).)

=== Night fighter operations ===
A map of part of the Kammhuber Line. The 'belt' and night fighter 'boxes' are shown.

Following the 1939 aerial Battle of the Heligoland Bight, bombing missions by the Royal Air Force (RAF) shifted to the cover of darkness, initiating the Defence of the Reich campaign. By mid-1940, Generalmajor (Brigadier General) Josef Kammhuber had established a night air defense system dubbed the Kammhuber Line. It consisted of a series of control sectors equipped with radars and searchlights and an associated night fighter. Each sector, named a Himmelbett (canopy bed), would direct the night fighter into visual range with target bombers. In 1941, the Luftwaffe started equipping night fighters with airborne radar such as the Lichtenstein radar. This airborne radar did not come into general use until early 1942.

Friedrich received training as a night fighter pilot and began his night-fighting era when he was posted to III. Gruppe (3rd group) of Nachtjagdgeschwader 1 (NJG 1—1st Night Fighter Wing) at the beginning of 1942. Friedrich claimed his first victory on the night of 16/17 June when he shot down an RAF Vickers Wellington at 03:08 5 kilometres (3.1 miles) west of Ijmuiden. Serving with II. Gruppe (2nd group) of Nachtjagdgeschwader 4 (NJG 4—4th Night Fighter Wing), he claimed his fourth victory on 24 October when he shot down the Handley Page Halifax bomber W1188 from No. 103 Squadron near Bar-le-Duc.

He was appointed Staffelkapitän (squadron leader) of 10. Staffel (10th squadron) of NJG 4 on 1 January 1943. On 10/11 April, 502 RAF bombers attacked Frankfurt. In total, the RAF lost 22 aircraft, ten of which shot down by NJG 4, including a Wellington bomber claimed by Friedrich at 03:23. On 16/17 April, during an attack of 327 bombers on Plzeň, Friedrich was shot down and wounded. He bailed out from his Messerschmitt Bf 110 and landed near Hochspeyer.

On 1 August 1943, IV. Gruppe of NJG 4 became the I. Gruppe of Nachtjagdgeschwader 6 (NJG 6—6th Night Fighter Wing) and was based at Mainz-Finthen Airport. On 12 July 1944, he was appointed Gruppenkommandeur (group commander) of I. Gruppe of NJG 6. Friedrich was awarded the Knight's Cross of the Iron Cross (Ritterkreuz des Eisernen Kreuzes) on 15 March 1945.

The RAF targeted the Wintershall oil refineries at Lützkendorf, which lies east of Mücheln, with 244 Lancaster bombers and eleven de Havilland Mosquito fast bombers on the night of 14/15 March 1945. In defense of this attack, Friedrich claimed three Lancasters shot down in timeframe 23:15 and 23:24.

On the night of 16/17 March 1945, Friedrich collided with the Lancaster PB785 from No. 576 Squadron RAF, piloted by Flight Lieutenant Frank Edmund Dotten, near Stuttgart. Friedrich and his crew, Leutnant Lewerenz, Oberfeldwebel Giesen and Unteroffizier Meyer, were killed in their Junkers Ju 88 G-6 (Werknummer 621801—factory number) along with the seven crew members of the British bomber.

== Summary of career ==
=== Aerial victory claims ===
According to Obermaier and Spick, Friedrich was credited with 30 nighttime—aerial victories, claimed in an unknown number of combat missions. Foreman, Parry and Mathews, authors of Luftwaffe Night Fighter Claims 1939 – 1945, researched the German Federal Archives and found records for 33 nocturnal victory claims. Mathews and Foreman also published Luftwaffe Aces – Biographies and Victory Claims, listing Friedrich with 32 claims, all of which on the Western Front.

Chronicle of aerial victories
This and the ? (question mark) indicates information discrepancies listed in Luftwaffe Night Fighter Claims 1939 – 1945 but not in Luftwaffe Aces — Biographies and Victory Claims.
Claim	Date	Time	Type	Location	Serial No./Squadron No.
– Stab III. Gruppe of Nachtjagdgeschwader 1 –
1	17 June 1942	03:08	Wellington	5 km (3.1 mi) west of Ijmuiden	
2	20 June 1942	03:13	Wellington	10 km (6.2 mi) north of Zandvoort	
3	26 July 1942	02:12	Wellington	6 km (3.7 mi) west of Zieuwent	
– Stab II. Gruppe of Nachtjagdgeschwader 4 –
4	24 October 1942	21:50	Halifax	Bar-le-Duc	Halifax W1188/No. 103 Squadron RAF
– 8. Staffel of Nachtjagdgeschwader 4 –
5	6 December 1942	19:29	Halifax	Courouvre	
– 10. Staffel of Nachtjagdgeschwader 4 –
6	9 March 1943	23:35	Lancaster	northwest of Rinuthall	
7	17 March 1943	00:16	Halifax	Börnloss	
8	11 April 1943	03:23	Wellington	Lünebach-Weuir	
– 2. Staffel of Nachtjagdgeschwader 6 –
9? (Note: This claim is listed in Luftwaffe Night Fighter Claims 1939 – 1945 but not in Luftwaffe Aces — Biographies and Victory Claims.)	6 September 1943	00:57	Halifax	vicinity of Mannheim-Sandhofen	
– 1. Staffel of Nachtjagdgeschwader 6 –
10	26 February 1944	01:33	Lancaster	Seeburg	Lancaster LM158/No. 90 Squadron RAF
11	2 March 1944	04:04	Halifax	60 km (37 mi) southwest of Strasbourg	
12	18 March 1944	22:32	Halifax	Preist	
13	31 March 1944	00:57	Halifax	northwest of Nürnberg	
14	11 April 1944	00:03	Lancaster	Montdidier	
15	11 April 1944	00:13	Halifax	vicinity of Montdidier	Halifax LV880/No. 51 Squadron RAF
16	28 April 1944	02:09	Halifax	Switzerland, west of Friedrichshafen	
17	28 April 1944	02:34	Halifax	Schaffhausen	
18	13 June 1944	01:25	Lancaster	vicinity of Deelen	
– Stab I. Gruppe of Nachtjagdgeschwader 6 –
19	12 September 1944	00:15	Lancaster	south of Darmstadt	
20	12 September 1944	22:46	Wellington	northwest of beacon "Christa" (Note: Beacon "Christa"—Near Haguenau in approximately 48°47′N 7°47′E)	
21	28 January 1945	23:53	Lancaster	south of Wildbad	
22	1 February 1945	19:20	Lancaster	Ludwigshafen	
23	2 February 1945	23:20	Lancaster	Karlsruhe	
24	2 February 1945	23:25	Lancaster	Karlsruhe	
25	21 February 1945	20:45	Halifax	10 km (6.2 mi) southwest of Worms	
26	23 February 1945	20:00	Lancaster	east of Pforzheim	
27	23 February 1945	20:08	Lancaster	east of Pforzheim	
28	23 February 1945	20:12	Lancaster	southeast of Pforzheim	
29	23 February 1945	20:15	Lancaster	south of Pforzheim	
30	14 March 1945	23:15	Lancaster		
31	14 March 1945	23:18	Lancaster		
32	14 March 1945	23:24	Lancaster		
33	16 March 1945	21:03	Lancaster	7 km (4.3 mi) south of Echterdingen	Lancaster PB785/No. 576 Squadron RAF

=== Awards ===
- German Cross in Gold on 1 October 1944 as Hauptmann in the 1./Nachtjagdgeschwader 6
- Knight's Cross of the Iron Cross on 15 March 1945 as Major and Gruppenkommandeur of the I./Nachtjagdgeschwader 6
