= Fiskerton, Lincolnshire =

Village in Lincolnshire, England

Coordinates: 53.2351°N 0.42829°W

Fiskerton
- Village and Civil Parish
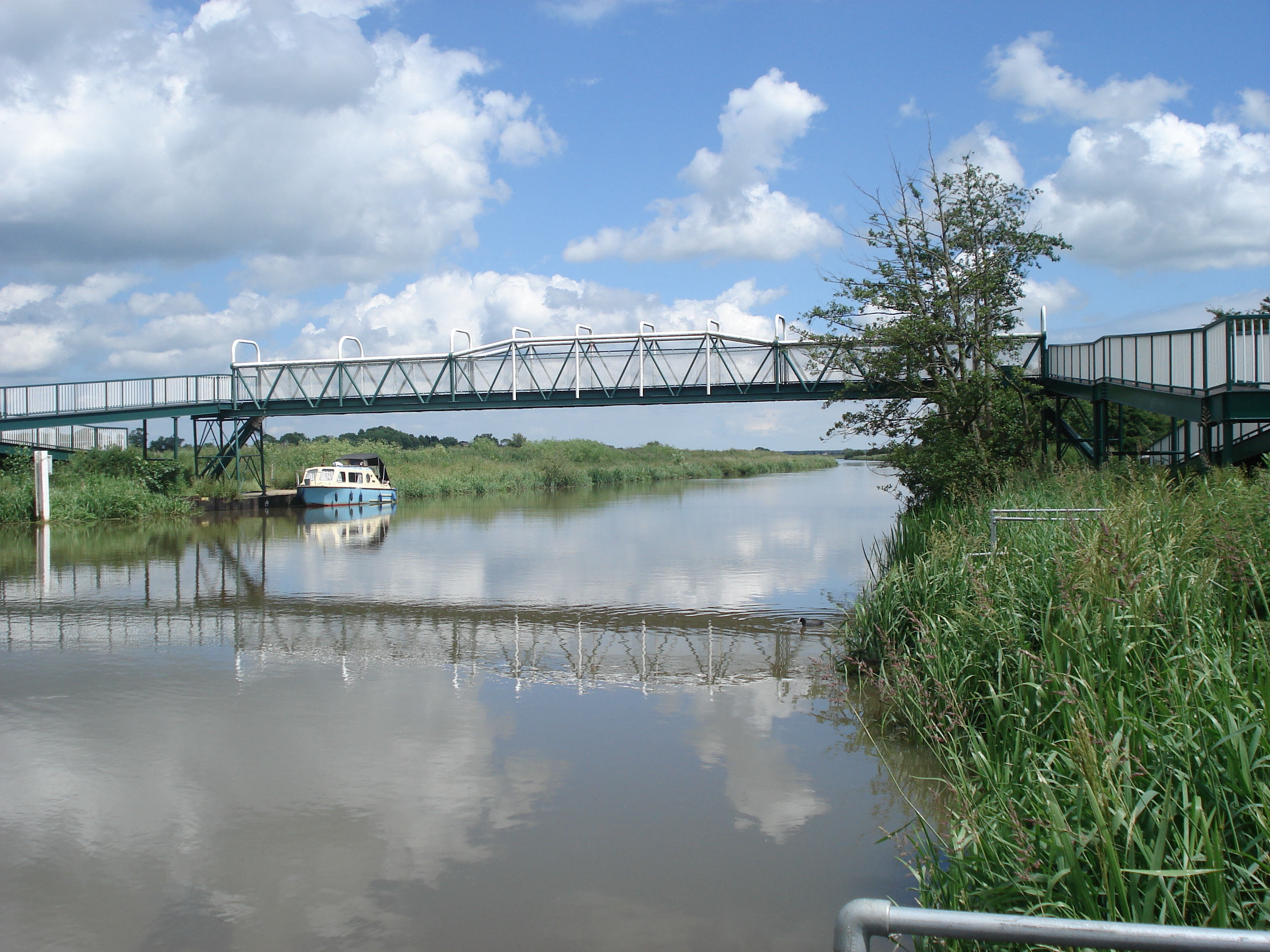
- Five Mile Bridge across the Witham

- Location within Lincolnshire
- Population: 1,209 (2011 Census)
- OS grid reference: TF050720
  - London: 120 mi (190 km) S
- District: West Lindsey
- Shire county: Lincolnshire
- Region: East Midlands
- Country: England
- Sovereign state: United Kingdom
- Post town: Lincoln
- Postcode district: LN3
- Dialling code: 01522
- Police: Lincolnshire
- Fire: Lincolnshire
- Ambulance: East Midlands
- UK Parliament: Gainsborough

Fiskerton is a village and civil parish in the West Lindsey district of Lincolnshire, England. The 2011 Census recorded the population of the civil parish as 1,209. It is about 6 miles (10 km) east of Lincoln, and on the north side of the River Witham.

== History ==
Fiskerton has received international archaeological attention on a number of occasions over the last two centuries following discoveries of Iron Age artefacts unearthed from the fenland peat around the village. In 1826 a fine, metre-long decorative shield was discovered in the River Witham, near Washingborough. Now known as the Witham Shield it has been dated to the second century BC (200–100 BC) and is in the British Museum.

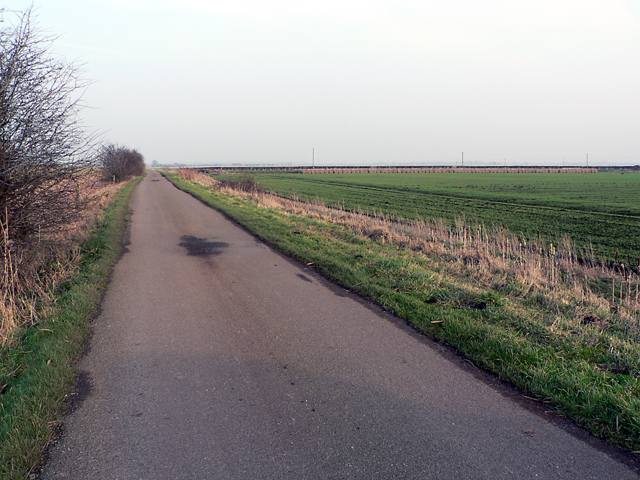
Branston Fen – North causeway

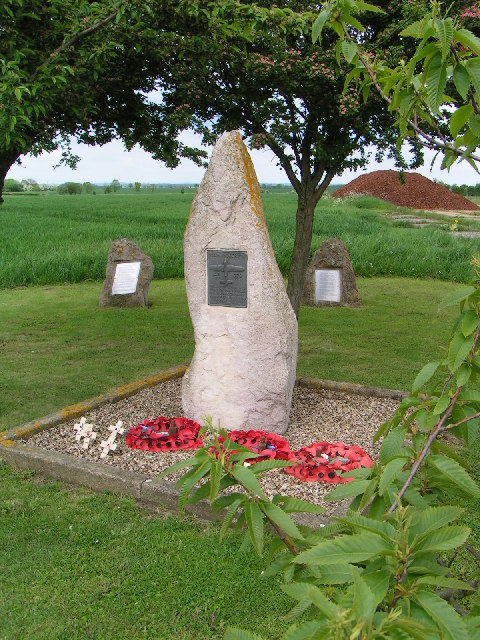
RAF memorial

Over 150 years later when a dyke was being cleaned, a series of posts were found together with an early to mid-Iron Age sword. Subsequent excavations in 1981 revealed the posts to be a wooden causeway which dendrologists dated to a period between 457 and 300 BC. It appeared to have been repaired and added to every eighteen years or so in that period and the construction and maintenance of a walkway on such a scale at that time would have been a major feat of engineering. Hundreds of artefacts were also found around the causeway, including eleven spears, six swords, woodworking and metalworking tools, as well as part of a human skull which had a crescent-shaped chop mark, probably inflicted by a sword; this injury is unlikely to have killed the man. It is possible that the Witham Shield was originally deposited beside this causeway.

Twenty years later in further excavations more sections of the causeway were dug out, some of them containing posts several metres long, plus a complete spear, a currency bar, a sword, a dagger and some bronze fittings, all of which appeared to have been deliberately damaged before their burial. The most important discovery was two votive Iron Age boats. One of these boats (the Fiskerton log boat) as well as other artefacts can be seen at The Collection in Lincoln. The area around the site of the causeway, which is beside the road to the hamlet of Short Ferry, 1.6 miles (2.5 km) to the east, opened as a nature reserve and is currently managed by the Lincolnshire Wildlife Trust.

In the Second World War, an airfield was built on agricultural land to the north of the village. RAF Fiskerton opened in January 1943 as part of 5 Group, RAF Bomber Command as 52 Sub-Base Station controlled by RAF Scampton. It closed at the end of the war in September 1945 and the land returned to agricultural use. Very little can be seen of the old airfield now, but a memorial to 49 and 576 squadrons, who were stationed at the airfield in the war, is beside the road between Fiskerton and Reepham, a village 1.5 miles (2.4 km) to the north.

== Religion ==
The Church of England parish church of St Clement is Grade I listed. The earliest parts of the church were built in the 11th century, and it was restored in 1863. The arcade of the north aisle is Norman; that of the south aisle, Early English. The Perpendicular-style tower is square, but encloses an earlier round tower. In 1916 a brass of a priest (c. 1485) in the south aisle was restored to the church by Bishop Trollope in 1863, having been found in a dealer's shop in Lincoln.

A Wesleyan Methodist chapel was built in the village in 1839.

== Fiskerton Phantom ==
The Fiskerton Phantom is a cryptozoological phantom cat or other creature, which was reportedly sighted near Fiskerton and formed the basis for a major character in The Secret Saturdays on Cartoon Network. This is one of many alleged non-native British big cats about which a variety of theories have been proposed.

The sighting was reported by four girls: Rachel Rowan, 12, Nicki Handley, 11, Nicola Proctor, 9, and Joanna Brogan, 10, staying at a caravan park next to the Tyrwhitt Arms pub at Short Ferry, the hamlet in the eastern part of Fiskerton parish. They described a four-foot-tall jet-black, bear-like creature feeding on a pheasant. The girls, who fled immediately to seek help in the pub, also reported finding large paw prints at the location when they returned later. Dave Brumhead, the Landlord of the Tyrwhitt Arms, reported that a motorist had made another sighting that evening, near where the girls had been. There were several further reports of a panther- or bear-like animal in the area in 1997.
