= Fiskerton log boat =

Iron Age log boat

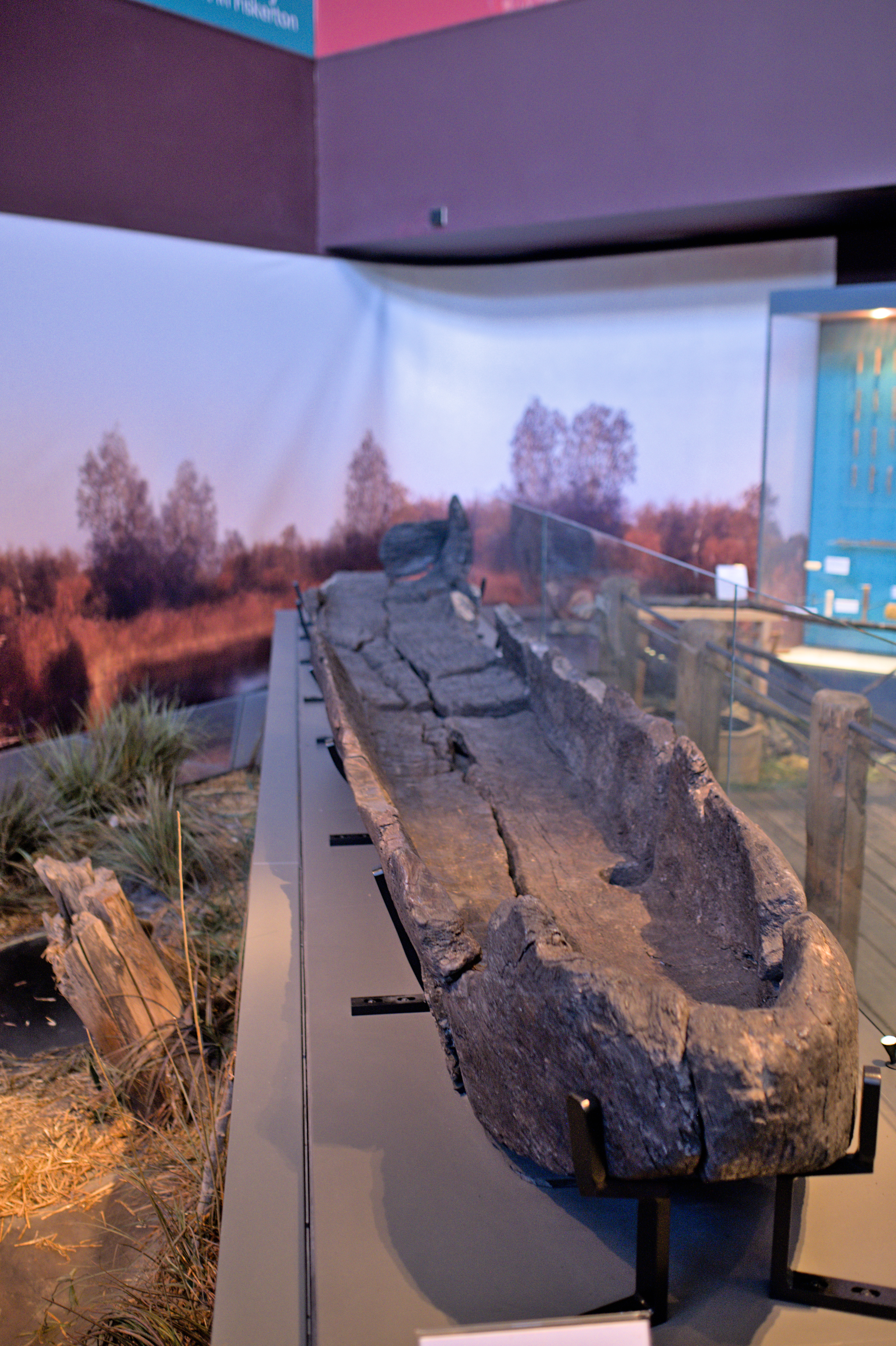
- Material: Wood (Oak)
- Size: 6 m
- Created: 457/6-300 BC
- Discovered: Banks of the River Witham near Fiskerton, Lincolnshire
- Present location: The Collection, Lincoln

The Fiskerton log boat is an Iron Age log boat, found during excavations in 2001 on the banks of the River Witham near Fiskerton, Lincolnshire.

== Discovery ==
The earliest excavations on the site were undertaken in 1981 by Naomi Field and Mike Parker Pearson, who discovered an Iron Age timber causeway with Iron Age and Roman votive offerings associated with it.

The 2001 excavations uncovered more of the timber causeway, used during the Iron Age by the Corieltavi tribe to deposit valuable objects into the waters as ritual offerings. The Witham Shield may have been one such object. The Fiskerton log boat was made from a single oak tree trunk, and still bears axe marks from its manufacture. It was deliberately sunk as an offering and may have been specially made for this purpose.

The process of the excavation at Fiskerton was the subject of a Meet the Ancestors Special entitled "Celtic Causeway", first aired on 27 March 2002.

== Description ==
The boat measures approximately 6 m in length and was worked from a single oak tree trunk. It has a bowed bow and a square stern, closed by a board slotted into a groove. This type of boat most likely would have been used to travel along rivers, transporting goods.

== Significance ==
The causeway has been dated using dendrochronology to date between 457/6–300 BC. As well as a second Iron Age boat, other votive offerings from the excavations include: a complete spear, a currency bar, a sword, a dagger, and some bronze fittings.

== Public display ==
The boat first went on public display in March 2006 at The Collection, Lincoln.

== See also ==
- List of surviving ancient ships
