= St Swithin's Church, Lincoln =

St Swithin’s Church, Lincoln
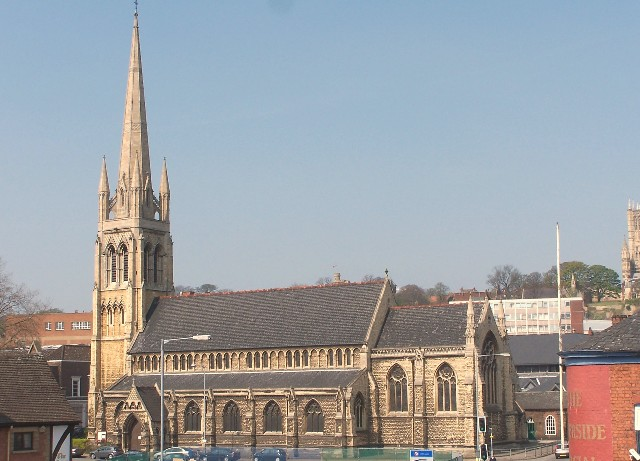
- St Swithin's Church, Lincoln
- St Swithin’s Church, Lincoln
- 53°13′45″N 00°32′14″W
- OS grid reference: SK 97742 71227
- Location: Lincoln, Lincolnshire
- Country: England
- Denomination: Church of England
- Churchmanship: Charismatic Evangelical Anglican
- Website: https://www.stswithins.org/

History
- Status: Active, but church currently closed due to repairs needed

Architecture
- Functional status: Parish Church
- Heritage designation: Grade II* listed
- Architect: James Fowler
- Groundbreaking: 1869
- Completed: 1887

Specifications
- Height: 55 m (180 ft)

Administration
- Province: Canterbury
- Diocese: Diocese of Lincoln
- Deanery: Christianity
- Parish: Lincoln, St Swithin

Clergy
- Vicar: Vacant

St. Swithin's Church, Lincoln is a Grade II* listed parish church located in St Swithin's Square, Lincoln, Lincolnshire, England. The congregation meet at The Salthouse, which is opposite Lincoln Central Library.

== History ==
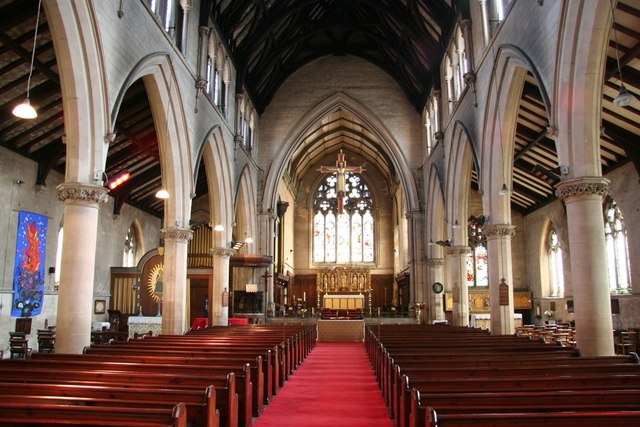
The nave and chancel

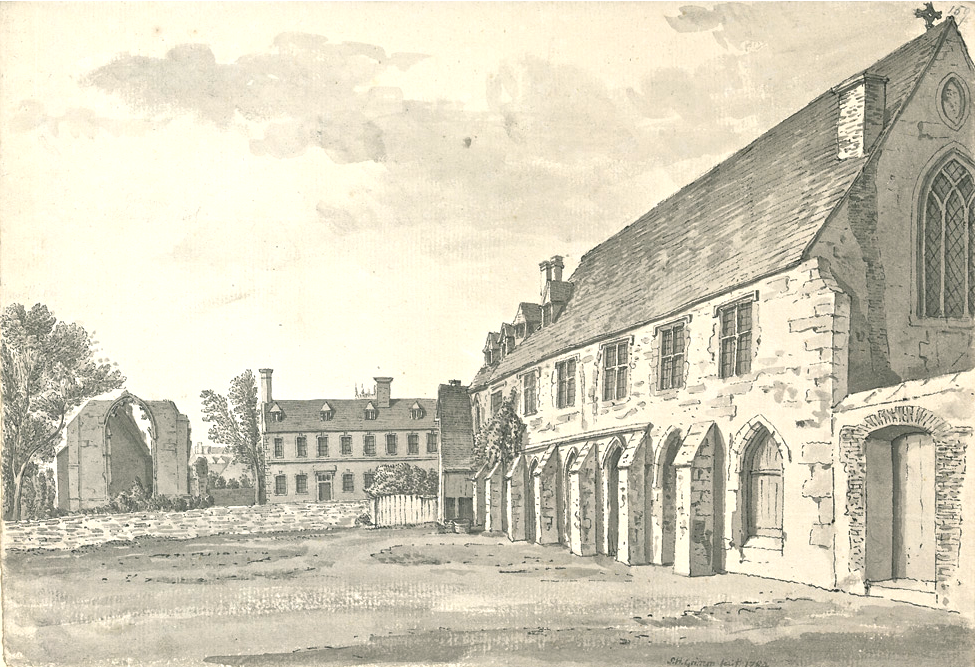
The ruins of the original St Swithin's Church and the Greyfriars, Lincoln c.1784

The original church of St Swithin was near the Sheep Market. It suffered a bad fire in 1644 during the English Civil War. It was rebuilt in stone in 1801. This was replaced with a new building on Sheep Square. The foundation stone was laid on Easter Day 1869 by the Bishop of Lincoln, Christopher Wordsworth.

The mathematician George Boole was christened in the earlier church on 3 November 1815. He had a close association with the church whose Rector, Rev. Dickson, encouraged him in his mathematics.

The church was built to designs of the architect, James Fowler of Louth and financed by Alfred Shuttleworth, a Lincoln industrialist. The nave and aisles were built between 1869 and 1871, the chancel was completed in 1879, and the construction of the tower and spire took place between 1884 and 1887.

Nikolaus Pevsner described the church as "without doubt his (James Fowler's) most important church."

During the construction a Roman altar was discovered which is currently in the collection of the Lincoln Museum.

The church contains a west window which was made by A L Moore & Co.

The church was listed as Grade II* in 1973.

== Present day ==
In October 2014, St Swithin's Church was relaunched, at the invitation of the Bishop of Lincoln, by a planting team from Holy Trinity Brompton (HTB) in the Diocese of London led by Revd Jim Prestwood.

The original church building is closed. The church now meets in person at the Salthouse in Free School Lane (the former Co-op Ballroom) at 10.00am and 6:30pm each Sunday. Although it is hoped that the church could be reopened for worship in the future, should funding be found and it being feasible.

== Organ ==
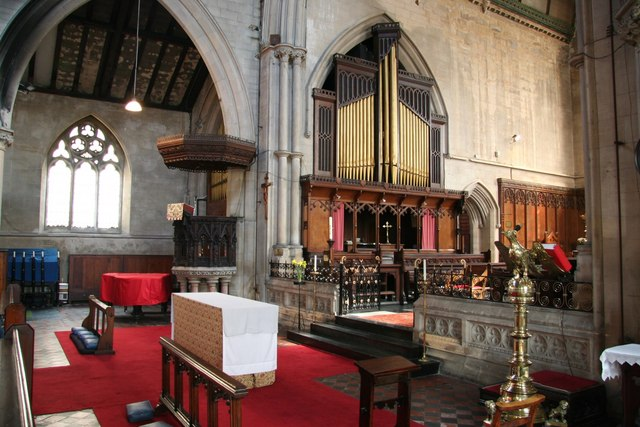
Chancel and organ

Details of the organ can be found on the National Pipe Organ Register.

=== Organists ===
- John Pullein 1896–1903
- A. A. Osborne 1903–1917
- Gerald Conran Hodgson 1917–1937
- Michael Boltz 2010–2014

== Bells ==
The single bell of 4cwt 0qr 21lb (213kg) was cast in 1851 by Charles & George Mears in Whitechapel, London. The bell is hung for swing chiming only.
