= Alfred William Rich =

English artist, teacher and author (1856–1921)

Alfred William Rich (4 March 1856 – 7 September 1921) was an English artist, teacher and author.

== Life and work ==
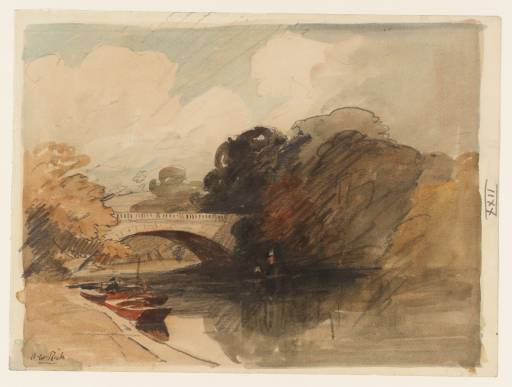
Shillingford Bridge, circa 1911, Tate Gallery.

Rich was born between Scaynes Hill and Lindfield in Sussex. His study of art began at the age of eight, as a self-taught student inspired by the examples of Turner, Old Crome, and Constable at the National Gallery.

His professional art career began as a heraldic painter from 1870–90. He studied briefly at the Westminster School of Art. But it was his six years of drawing from classical casts and from nature at the Slade School of Fine Art, starting in 1890, which led him to his love of landscape and watercolour. He studied first under Alphonse Legros and subsequently under Professor Fred Brown. He was a member of the New English Art Club from 1898.

Rich was influenced by the watercolour techniques of Thomas Girtin, John Sell Cotman and Peter De Wint, especially their use of the rich blooms produced by applying a full wash and allowing it to dry undisturbed. But whilst he referred to the earlier school of watercolourists his works are all his own and were created as much as reaction to French Impressionism but with a peculiarly English slant. As Rich and a number of his contemporaries pointed out (including Roger Fry and Lawrence Binyon) it was arguably the English watercolour tradition of painting quickly En plein air that had inspired much of the Impressionism's original spontaneity and it was an area where the English artistic tradition could claim to have been innovative. Rich was an advocate of a natural approach to painting, trying to capture the emotions which a subject provoked, rather than accurately reproducing a scene. He had little feeling towards what he termed "exhibition pieces", which he viewed as being overworked. He was critical towards even some of the greatest masters who he believed were often guilty of marring their work by polishing over the traces of their original responses to a scene. He also disliked "pretty pictures", a term which he used to refer to the quaint works produced by some of his contemporaries and used this term as a thinly veiled criticism of the work of Helen Allingham.

Rich's first public exhibitions were at his studio in Croydon in 1896, followed by showings at the New English Art Club, the Piccadilly Egyptian Hall, the Alpine Club, Goupil's London Salon, the Carfax Gallery, the Leicester Galleries and Walker's Galleries. He worked on the Selecting Jury of the NEAC from 1904, and was elected to the Council of the International Society of Sculptors, Painters and Gravers in 1913. His work was included in the 1914 Venice Biennale. He taught and travelled with groups of students, always encouraging them to draw and paint directly from nature rather than copying from classic paintings (contrary to other schools of teaching which emphasized the work of the masters). He eschewed studio work and easels, preferring to work with stretched paper on a board held flat on his knees, seated in a camp chair.

His book Watercolour Painting (1918) was published as part of the popular New Art Library and remained in print for nearly 50 years as a standard work on the subject.

Rich died in Tewkesbury in 1921. After his death, Walker's Galleries held a retrospective in 1923 and Manchester City Art Gallery a memorial exhibition in 1928. A scholarship in his name was established at the Slade School in 1934 and this is still awarded annually.

== Written work ==
- Water Colour Painting (London: Seeley Service & Co, 1918)

== Select works ==
- Circa 1900- Lewes, Sussex, watercolour on paper – Manchester Art Gallery
- 1901- Fishing boats and figures on a beach, watercolour on paper – British Museum, London
- 1909- St Mary's, Oxford , watercolour on paper - Tate Gallery, London
- 1910- Boston Stump, Lincolnshire, watercolour on paper – Museum of New Zealand Te Papa Tongarewa
- 1911- Shillingford Bridge, watercolour on paper – Tate Gallery, London
- 1913- Shardeloes Park, Bucks, watercolour on paper – Tate Gallery, London
- Circa 1914- The Thames at Greenwich, watercolour on paper – Hugh Lane Gallery, Dublin
- 1915- St Mary's', Huntingdon, watercolour on paper – Musée du Louvre, Paris, Département Des Arts Graphiques
- 1919- "Richmond Castle, Yorkshire", watercolour on paper – Art Gallery of New South Wales, Sydney
- 1921- Gloucestershire landscape, watercolour on paper – British Museum, London
- Undated- A landscape with figures, watercolour on paper , Collection of The British Council
