= Peter De Wint =

English painter

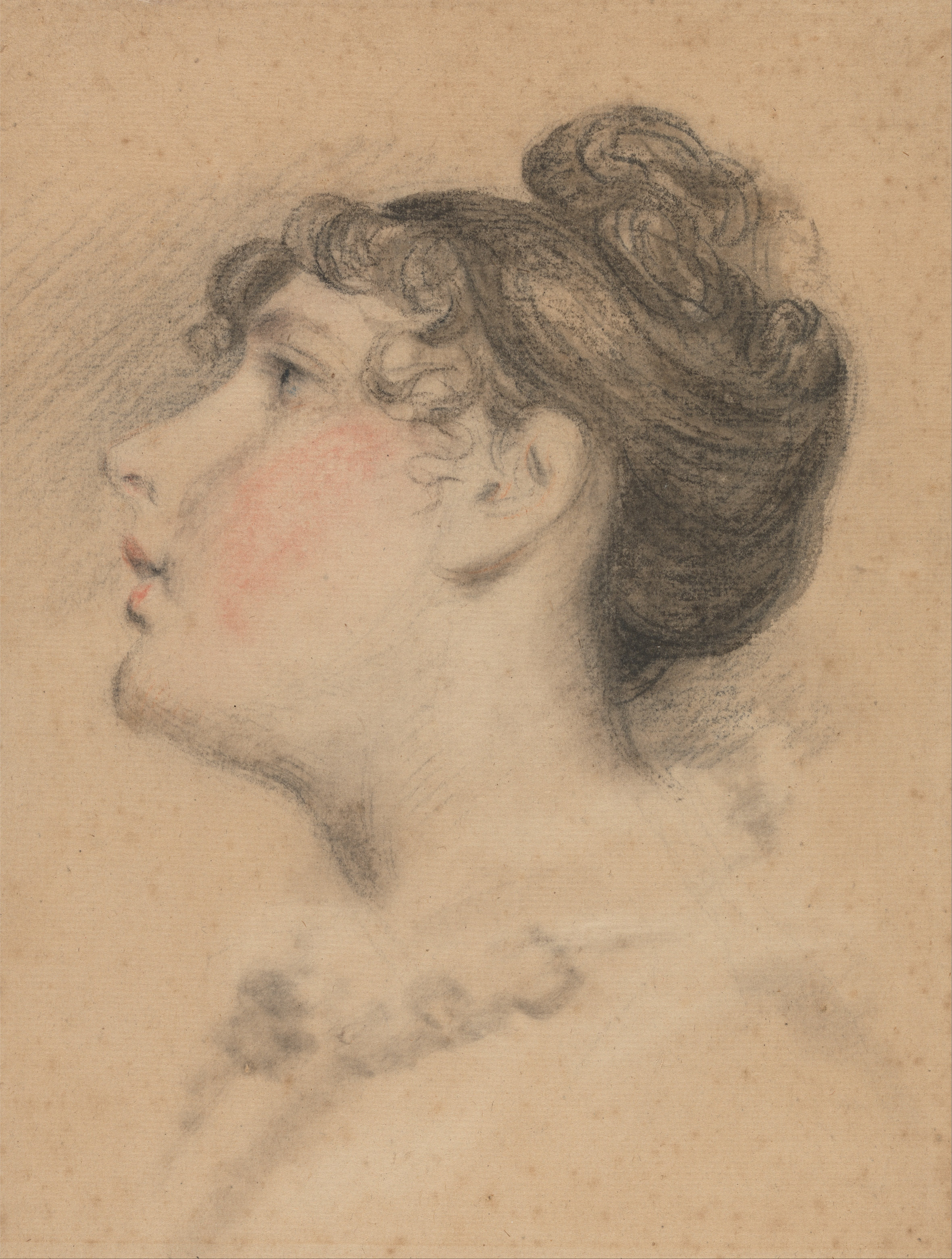
- Head of a Girl: Probably a study of Harriet De Wint
- Born: 21 January 1784; Stone, Staffordshire, England
- Died: 30 January 1849 (aged 65); London, England
- Occupation: Artist
- Spouse: Harriet Hilton

Peter De Wint (21 January 1784 – 30 January 1849) was a prolific English painter, mostly in landscape painting in oils and watercolour. A number of his pictures are in Tate Britain, the Victoria and Albert Museum and The Collection, Lincoln. He died in London.

== Biography ==
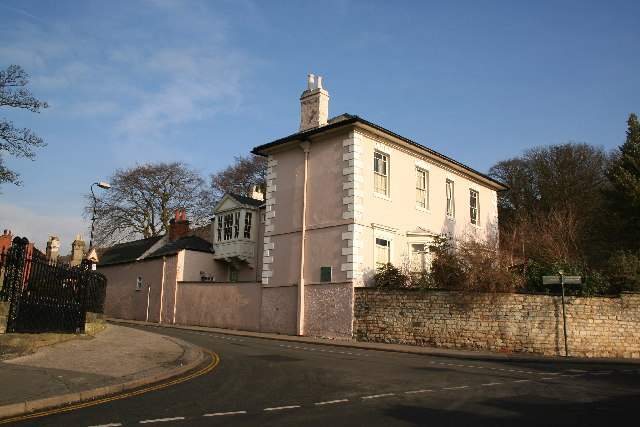
The early 19th-century Hilton House was the Lincoln home of Peter de Wint

De Wint was the son of an English physician of Dutch extraction who had come to England from New York. He was born in Stone, Staffordshire.

In 1800, William Hilton was apprenticed to the engraver John Raphael Smith, and around the same time enrolled at the Royal Academy Schools. Another apprentice from 1802 was Peter De Wint, they were inseparable friends. Apprenticed to John Raphael Smith, the mezzotinter and portrait painter, he bought his freedom from the contract with Smith in 1806, on condition that he supplied 18 oil paintings over the following two years.

In 1806 he visited Lincoln for the first time, with the painter of historical subjects William Hilton, R.A., whose sister Harriet he married in 1810. They had one child, Helen De Wint (1811–1873). De Wint and Hilton lived together in Broad Street, Golden Square, where John Varley lived. Varley gave De Wint lessons and introduced him to Monro, who ran an informal academy for young artists. De Wint often visited Hilton's home in Up-Hill, Lincoln and painted many of his landscapes in the district.

De Wint first exhibited at the Royal Academy in 1807, and the following year at the Gallery of Associated Artists in Watercolours. In 1809 entered the Royal Academy Schools. He was elected an Associate of the Old Water Colour Society in 1810 and was made a full member the following year. By that time, as an established drawing-master, he was spending his summers teaching well-to-do provincial families. In 1812 he became a member of the Society of Painters in Watercolours, where he exhibited for many years, as well as at the Academy.

De Wint's life was devoted to art; he painted admirably in oils, and he ranks as one of the chief English watercolourists. "No artist", asserted Alfred William Rich, "ever came nearer painting a perfect picture than did Peter de Wint." He frequently visited his wife's home city of Lincoln, and many of his panoramic landscapes and haymaking scenes are set in Lincolnshire. He occasionally toured in Wales, and in 1828 travelled to Normandy.

In Lincoln Cathedral is a cenotaph erected by Harriet De Wint (1791–1866) in memory of the two artists - De Wint her husband, and Hilton, her brother. Harriet and the De Wint's only child, Helen, are buried together on the western side of Highgate Cemetery.

He was buried in the Hilton family grave in the Savoy Chapel (destroyed by fire on 7 July 1864). The chapel was restored in 1866 and Mrs. De Wint placed a beautiful font in the edifice. Close by a tablet bears the words. 'This font was presented to the Chapel Royal of the Savoy by Harriet De Wint, in place of a Monument previously erected to the memory of her brother William Hilton R.A., her husband Peter de Wint, and other members of her family, whose remains are interred in the adjoining cemetery. The Monument was destroyed by the fire, July VII., MDCCCLXIV. May this tribute be long preserved to the glory of God'.

== Gallery ==
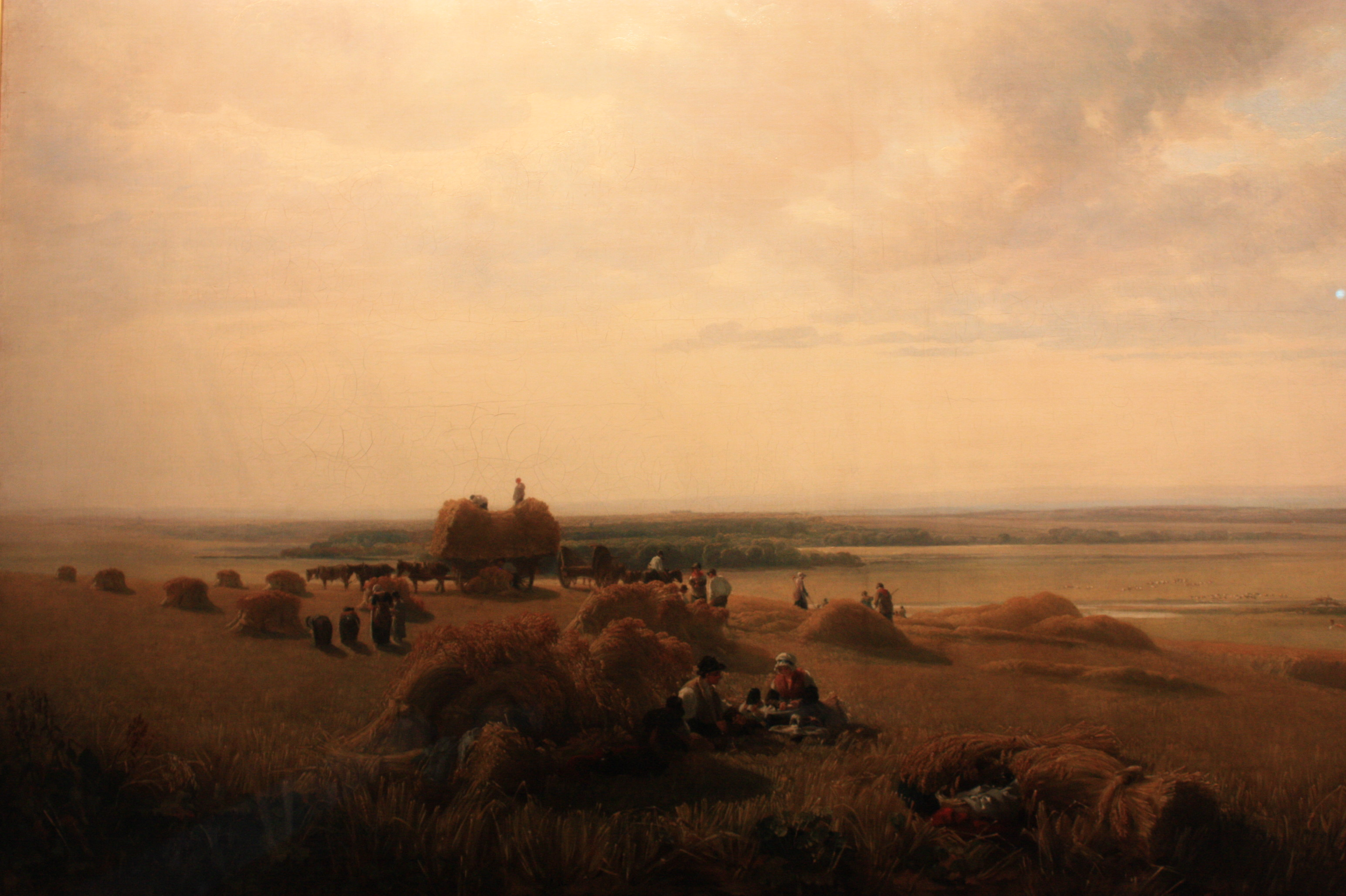
A Cornfield, by Peter de Wint,1815 (V&A)

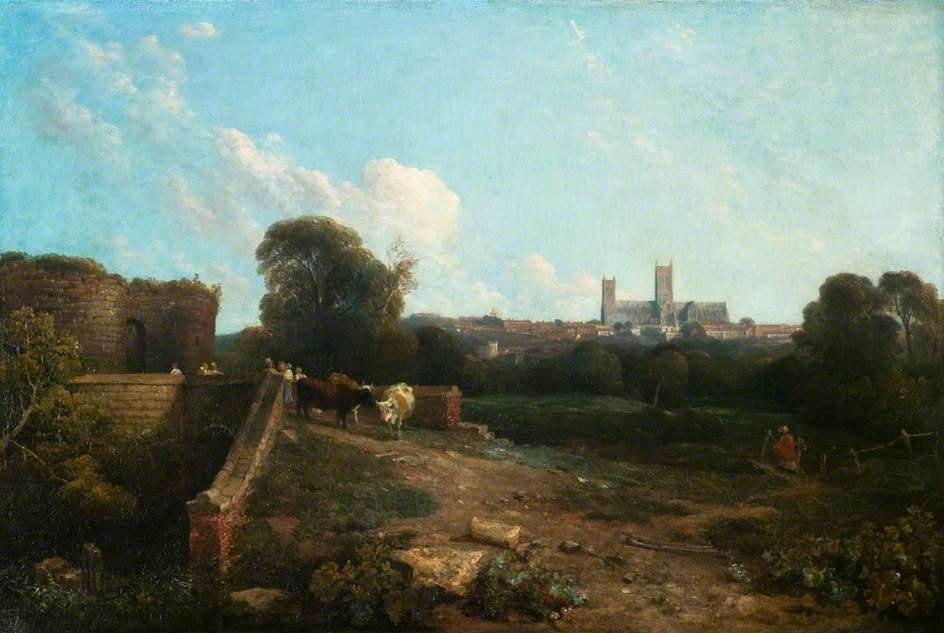
Lincoln from the South (1824)

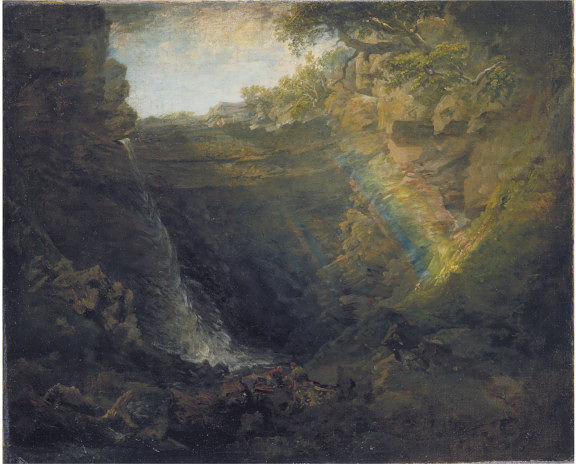
Black Gang Chine, Isle of Wight, about 1843, V&A Museum no. 1036-1886

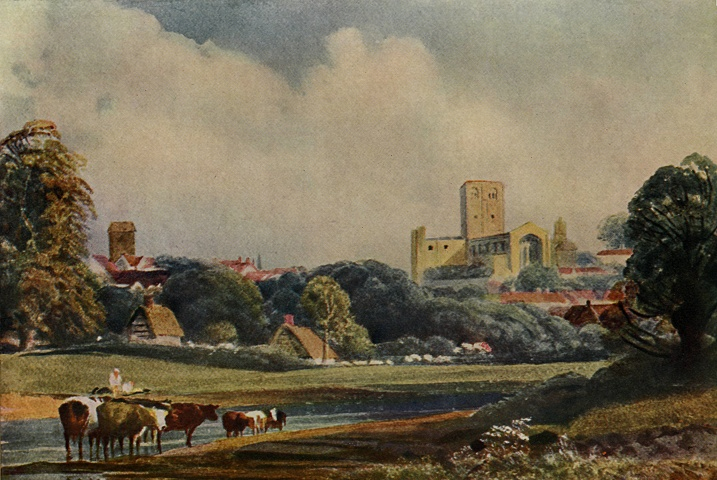
St. Albans by Peter de Wint

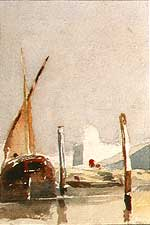
Barque (1816)

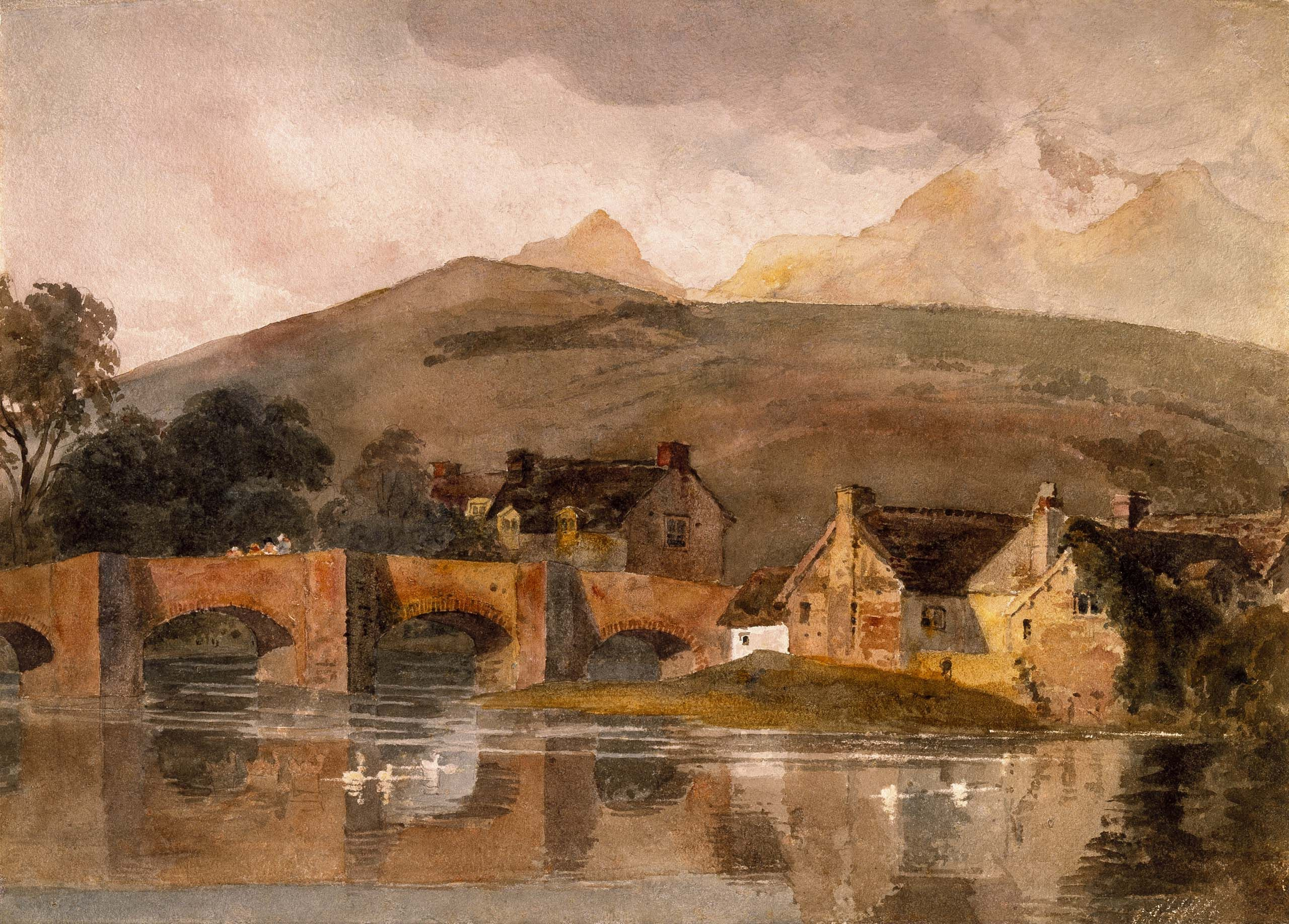
Village by a River

== Selected Paintings ==
32 Works in Tate Britain, including:

- 1810 – Children at Lunch by a Corn Stook, Oil on board – Tate Gallery, London
- 1840 – Roman Canal, Lincolnshire, watercolour on paper – Tate Gallery, London

There are several works in the Lincoln Museum and Usher Gallery, and nearly 100 watercolours in the Yale Center for British Art.
