= Henry Whitehead Moss =

Henry Whitehead Moss (23 June 1841 – 14 January 1917) was an English scholar.

== Early life and education ==
Moss was born at Lincoln. He was educated at Lincoln Grammar School and Shrewsbury before entering St. John's College, Cambridge, where he held a scholarship, in 1860. In 1862, two years after his arrival, he was elected the Craven University scholar, and in 1864 he gained his BA as Senior Classic and was appointed a Fellow and Lecturer of St. John's. He was ordained a Church of England priest in 1866 and graduated M.A. in 1867.

== Career ==
In 1866, Benjamin Hall Kennedy resigned the headmastership of Shrewsbury School, and at the age of 25, Moss was chosen to succeed him; he remained in the post for forty-two years, until he retired in 1908. Whilst headmaster, he supervised the movement of the school from its town centre site to a new location, at Kingsland, on the outskirts of the town in 1882.

Among many improvements he made in the life of the school at its new location was to present the school with a swimming bath as a personal gift and to purchase additional land to expand the playing fields, re-establish speech days and the school's cadet rifle corps, and make better provision for teaching mathematics, modern languages and natural sciences. He also introduced 'Merit Halves' - a half-day holiday as reward for academic achievement, punctuality in attending school chapel, and a minimal number of punishments.

He was Chairman of the Headmasters' Conference from 1899 to 1902.

== Personal life and death ==
In 1886, he married Frances Emma Mary Beaufort. They had two sons and four daughters.

Moss lived at Highfield Park in Headington near Oxford towards the end of his life, and was also a prebendary of Hereford Cathedral from 1887 until his death in London in 1917, aged 75. He was buried in Shrewsbury at the General Cemetery in Longden Road; ironically, while in process of choosing a new site for the move of Shrewsbury School, he had rejected an adjacent field after seeing at least six funerals arrive.
