= RAF Fiskerton =

Former RAF station in Lincolnshire, England

RAF Fiskerton
- Fiskerton, Lincolnshire in England

Site information
- Code: FN
- Owner: Air Ministry
- Operator: Royal Air Force
- Controlled by: RAF Bomber Command * No. 1 Group RAF * No. 5 Group RAF

Location
- Shown within Lincolnshire RAF Fiskerton (the United Kingdom)
- Coordinates: 53°14′37″N 000°25′40″W

Site history
- Built: 1942
- In use: January 1943 - December 1945
- Battles/wars: European theatre of World War II

Airfield information
- Elevation: 15 metres (49 ft) AMSL
Runways
Direction	Length and surface
05/23	4,200 feet (1,300 m) Asphalt
08/26	6,000 feet (1,800 m) Asphalt
13/31	4,200 feet (1,300 m) Asphalt

Royal Air Force Fiskerton or more simply RAF Fiskerton was a Royal Air Force station located 5 miles (8 km) east of Lincoln, just north of the village of Fiskerton, in Lincolnshire, England. The airfield closed at the end of the war in 1945 being a satellite to RAF Scampton and very little now exists. The station was home to some 2000 personnel during the war, and various technical sites were in what is now the village of Fiskerton. A small cluster of semi-derelict buildings still exist and are still in use at the end of the present village on the road out to short ferry. Drake's view is the entrance to these old buildings.

== History ==
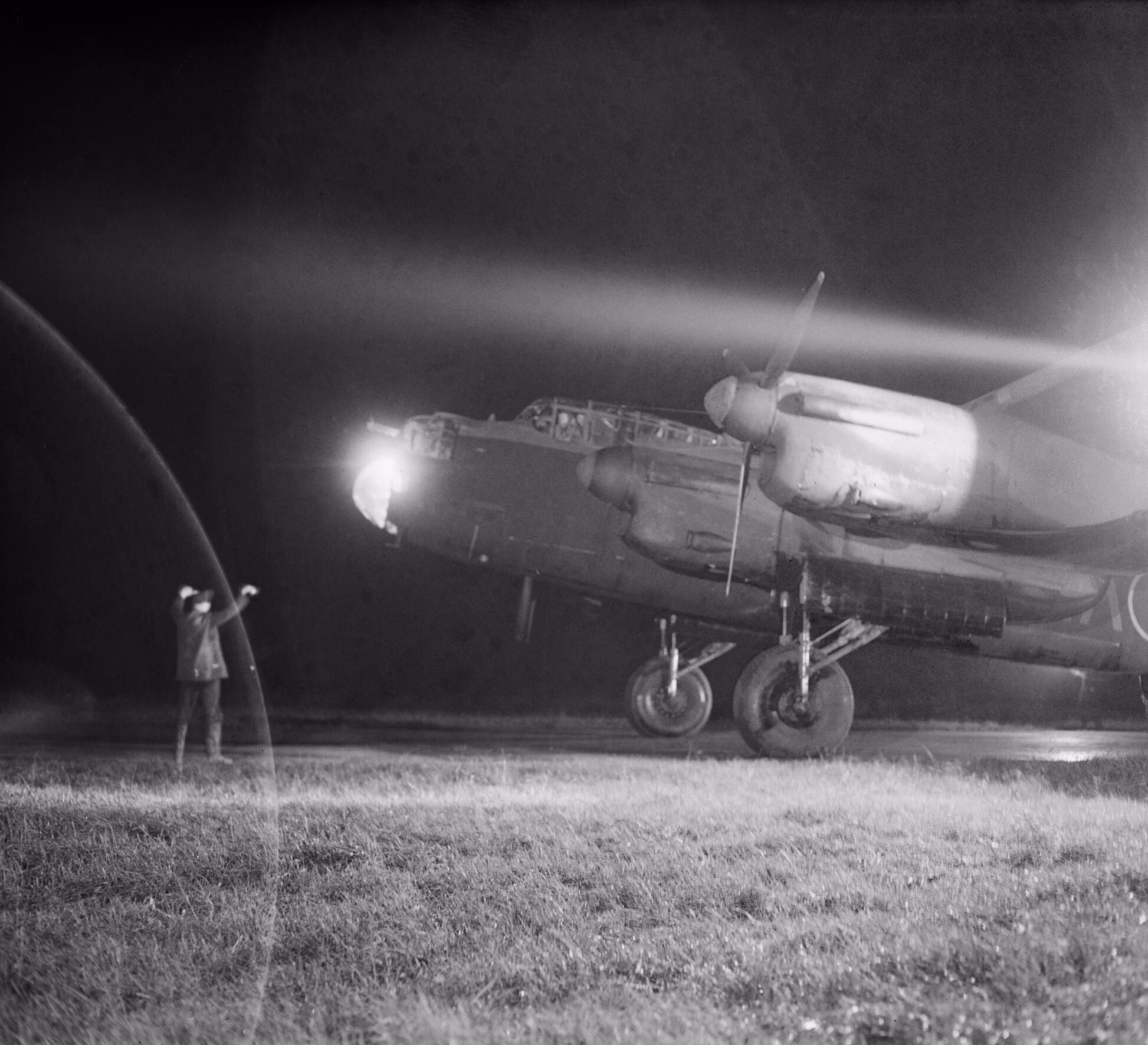
Avro Lancaster D for Donald of No. 49 Squadron RAF returns to RAF Fiskerton after bombing Berlin, 22 November 1943. A month later the aircraft and crew were lost returning from Berlin.

It was one of many new bomber airfields built in the early part of the Second World War. Late in the war, in October 1944, it was equipped with FIDO, one of only 15 RAF airfields with this fog-clearing system utilising petrol pumped through pipes alongside the main runway and burned via a sequence of nozzles.

The first unit to arrive, in January 1943, was No. 49 Squadron RAF with Avro Lancasters. No. 49 Squadron took part in the Peenemünde raid on the research and development centre for the V2 missile. They moved out in October 1944, their place taken by No. 576 Squadron RAF. No. 576 Squadron took part in the raid on Hitler's hideout at Berchtesgaden and in Operation Manna.

During the Second World War, Billy Strachan, who would go onto become a pioneer of Black civil rights in Britain, took part in 15 bombing missions from RAF Fiskerton as a member of 576 Squadron.

Between 1962 and 1992 a Headquarters of the Royal Observer Corps was located within the airfield boundary.

The following units were here at some point:

- No. 61 Maintenance Unit RAF
- No. 93 Maintenance Unit RAF
- No. 141 Squadron RAF
- No. 150 Squadron RAF with Avro Lancasters (briefly, in October 1944)
- No. 255 Maintenance Unit RAF
- No. 1514 (Beam Approach Training) Flight RAF
- No. 1690 Bomber (Defence) Training Flight RAF
- No. 2753 Squadron RAF Regiment
- No. 2799 Squadron RAF Regiment

== Current use ==
Very little now remains of the old airfield. Land which once formed part of the aerodrome was donated by the owner, the late Geoff Stuffin, so a memorial to 49 and 576 Squadrons could be erected. Today the memorial can be found on the side of the road near the old main runway together with a plaque recording the generosity of Mr Stuffin. The majority of the rest of the airfield was handed back to the farmers.

== Gallery ==
RAF Fiskerton
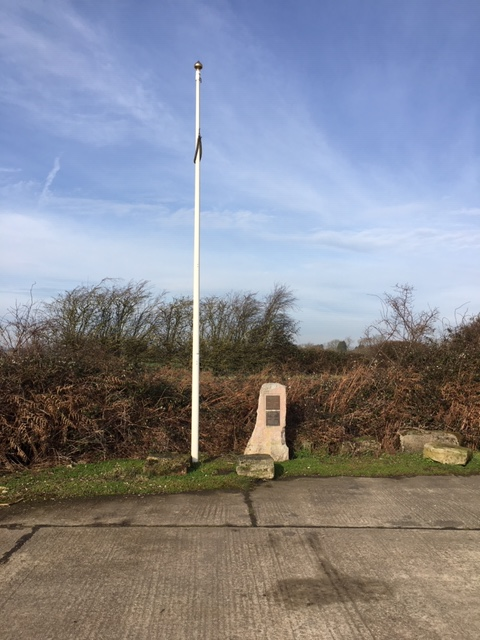
Flag staff and memorial RAF Fiskerton

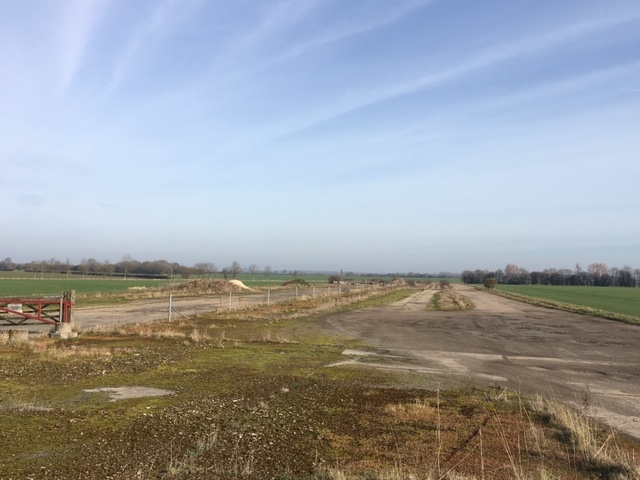
Runway 05 RAF Fiskerton (February, 2019)

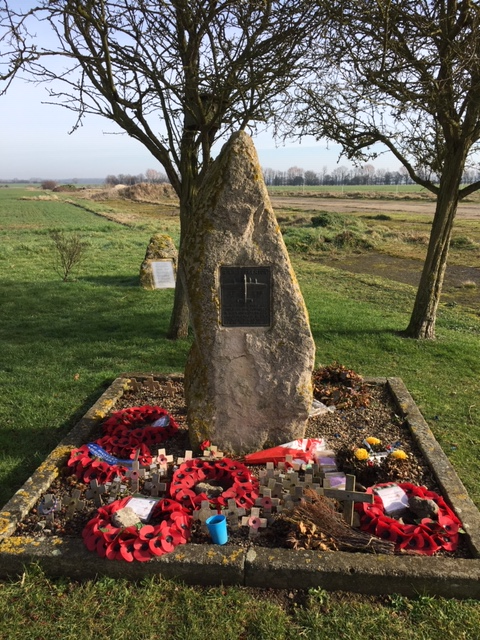
Memorial commemorating 49 & 576 Squadrons, RAF Fiskerton

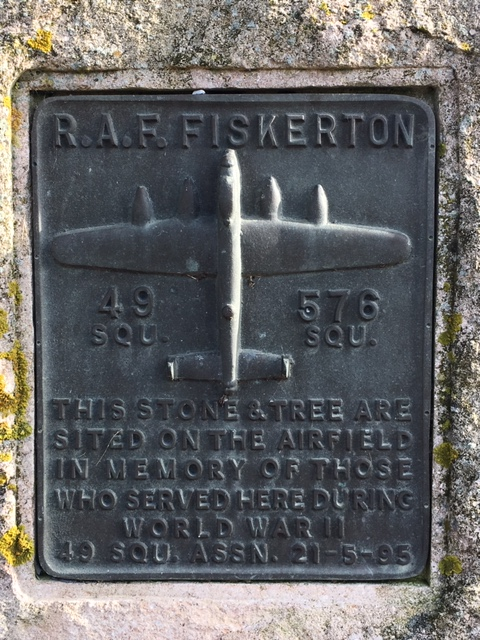
Inscription on memorial commemorating 49 & 576 Squadrons, RAF Fiskerton

== See also ==
- List of former Royal Air Force stations
