= Lincoln Museum, Lincolnshire =

Museum and gallery in Lincoln, England

Lincoln Museum
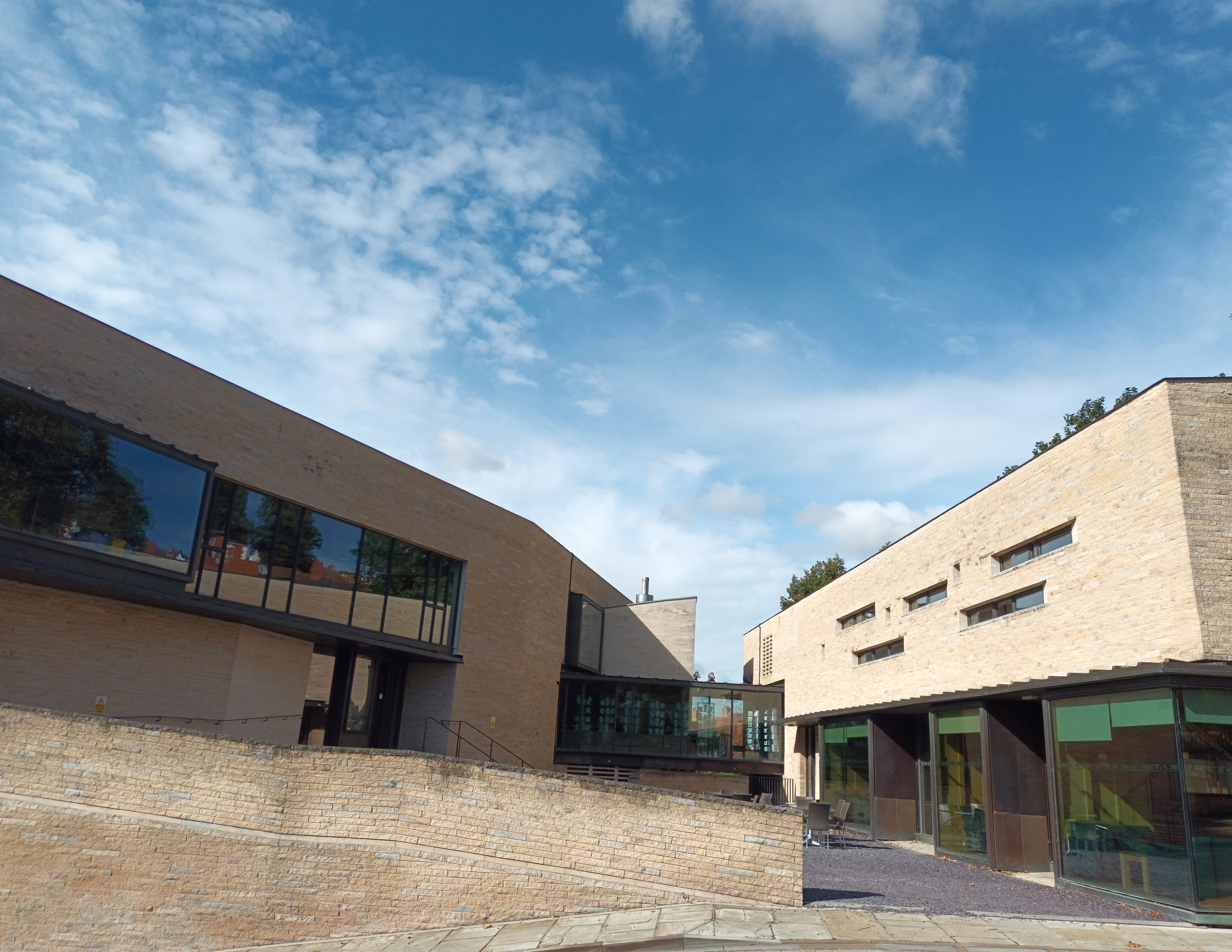
- Front of the museum
- Established: 1927; 99 years ago
- Location: Lincoln, England
- Coordinates: 53.2321°N 0.536556°W
- Type: Museum
- Website: www.lincolnmuseum.com

Lincoln Museum, formerly The Collection, is the county museum and gallery for Lincolnshire in England. It is an amalgamation of the Usher Gallery and the City and County Museum. The museum part of the enterprise is housed in a new, purpose-built building close by the Usher Gallery in the city of Lincoln. The name "The Collection" was in use from 2005; it was renamed "Lincoln Museum and Usher Gallery" in 2023.

== History ==
Lincoln Museum has existed since 2005. It is a merger between the Usher Gallery, which was established in 1927, and the City and County Museum, founded in 1906. The first curator of the Lincoln City and County Museum was Arthur Smith (1869–1947), who was born in Leicester and raised in Grimsby, and who was interested in natural history. After being appointed curator, he moved to Lincoln. He became the (honorary) secretary of the Lincolnshire Naturalists' Union (LNU) and acquired important collections, for example from J. E. Mason (Heteroptera, bugs), W. Wallace (Diptera, flies) and G. W. Mason (Lepidoptera, butterflies). The museum also acquired important collections of bird specimens, for instance from George Henry Caton Haigh.

Smith retired as curator in 1935. He moved away from Lincoln and died in 1947.

== Location ==
Lincoln consists of two parts, that at the top of the cliff and that in the Witham valley. The site of the museum is on the steep slope between the two and within the Roman colonia which linked the 1st-century legionary fortress with the shipping and commerce in the river.

== Buildings ==
The Usher Gallery was built to house the collection of James Ward Usher, using funds he bequeathed for the purpose. It was designed by the architect Sir Reginald Blomfield and was officially opened on 25 May 1927 by the Prince of Wales. It is a simple building faced in stone with brick panels separated by simplified Tuscan pilasters, above which is a frieze decorated with triglyphs and a roofline finished with a balustrade. The portico, central in the south façade, is topped by a broken pediment and urn finials. The gallery stands in a small park on the hillside looking southwards across the lower town.

The Usher Gallery is the only purpose-built public art gallery in Lincolnshire. and a Grade II* listed building. The Usher is owned by Lincoln City Council but is leased to Lincolnshire County Council.

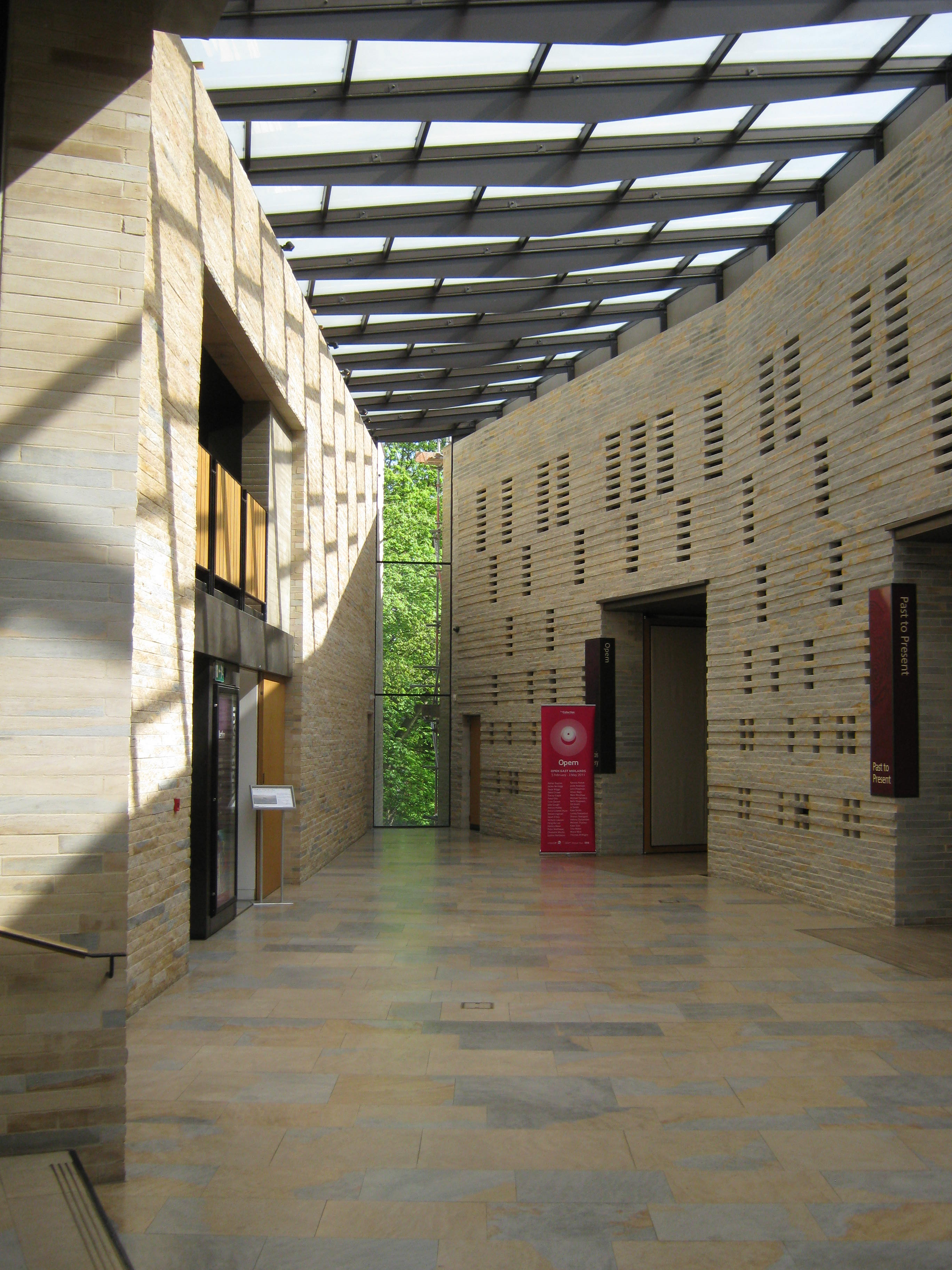
The glass-covered courtyard

Following an architectural design competition managed by RIBA Competitions, Panter Hudspith Architects, led by Simon Hudspith, designed the new building. It was opened in October 2005 after much work, which included an archaeological excavation. Despite the building having been designed to rest above the Roman horizon, at the foot of the pit for the lift shaft was found the corner of a mosaic-paved passage which had been laid around a courtyard.

Much of the new building is faced and paved with Ancaster stone and borrows the concept of the glass-covered courtyard from the British Museum in a feature reminiscent of a medieval alley.

The main entrance is at the northern, uphill end and leads past, to the left, the café, which faces south across a courtyard, and, to the right, the shop. Passing the reception desk leads to the orientation hall, which is the glass-covered "alley" passing east to west. From it, the visitor reaches auditorium where video or personal introductions to the museum or to education courses may be given; the education suite; the archaeological collection or the New Curtois Gallery, where touring exhibitions are housed. Below these last two, at the downhill end of the building, are the stores and workshops which service the whole.

== Exhibits ==
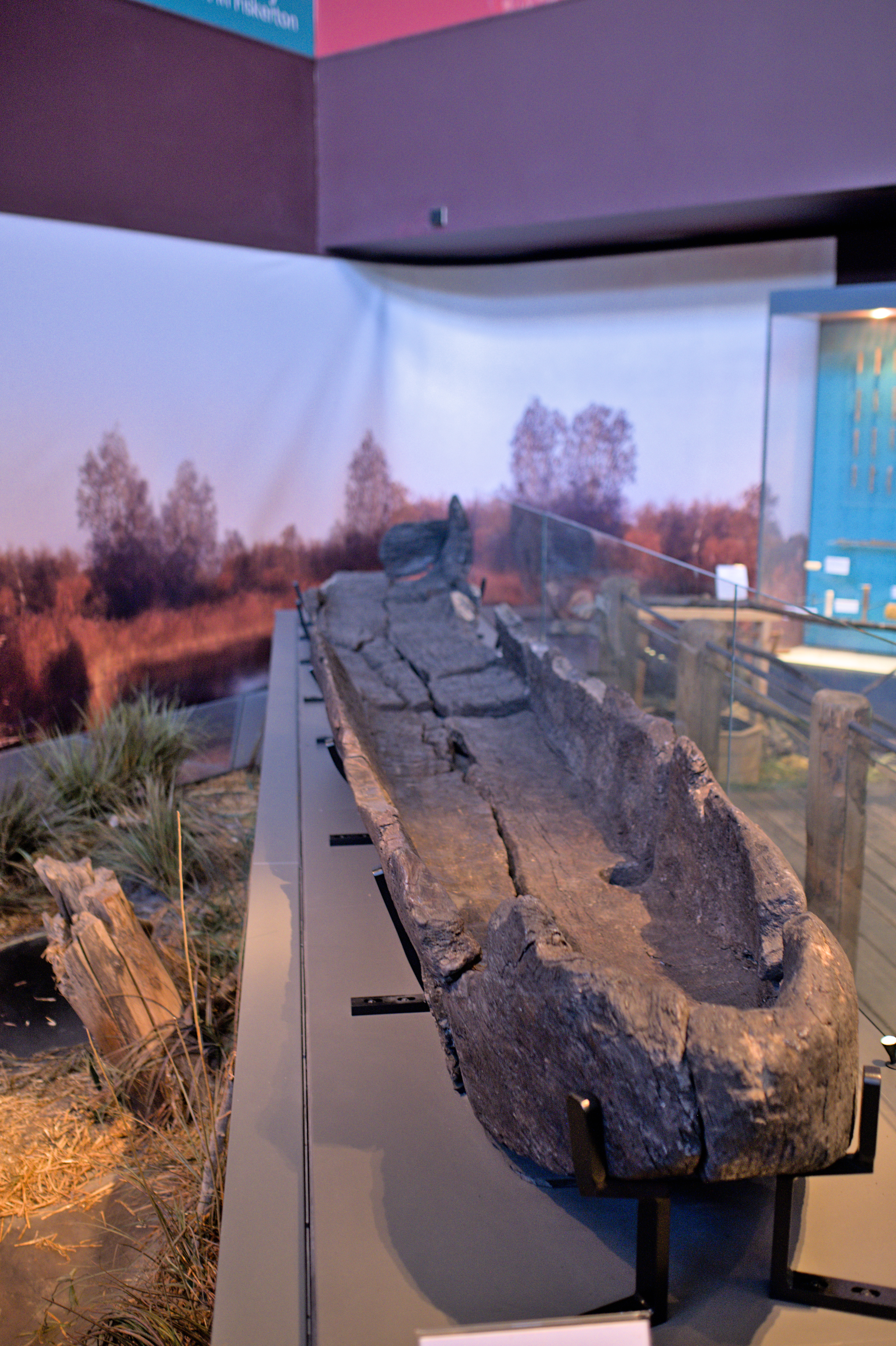
The Fiskerton log boat

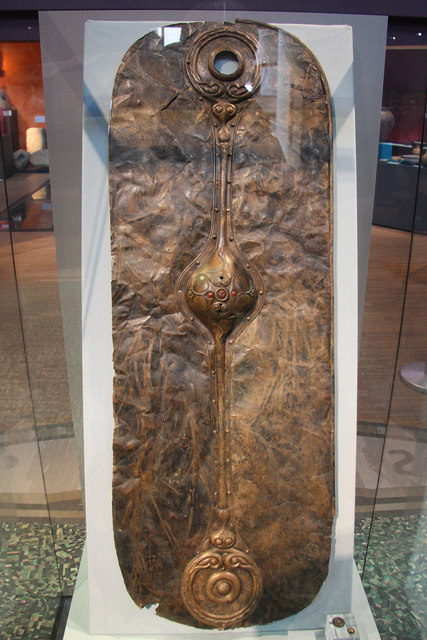
The Witham Shield, displayed in March 2013 at The Collection, on temporary loan from the British Museum

The sample of mosaic exposed by the pre-construction archaeological excavation is now on view inside the museum, as part of a display extending through all periods from the Ice Age. The mosaic is the largest to be discovered in Lincoln for over a hundred years.

The archaeological exhibition is organised as a timeline from the Stone Age, through Roman, Anglo-Saxon (including the Horncastle boar's head) and Viking occupation to the Medieval period. Much of the Iron Age material is from the dig at Fiskerton, including the Fiskerton log boat. It includes a satellite photograph of the county of Lincolnshire on a scale which permits fields and villages to be sought out, while the picture's extent allows a general pattern of geology and the influence of the Roman roads to show through.

The long-established displays in the Usher Gallery include furniture, clocks and other forms of the decorative arts, from Usher's collection. There is a full-length portrait of Joseph Banks by Benjamin West (1773), and a range of works by J. M. W. Turner, John Piper and L. S. Lowry. The gallery's specialism is in the works of Peter De Wint, a former resident of Lincoln. Other artists with works in the collection include Ivon Hitchens, Charles Haslewood Shannon and Grayson Perry. Four galleries of various sizes are set aside for temporary exhibitions.

== Modern and contemporary art programme ==
The Usher Gallery has an established programme of inviting contemporary curators and artists to exhibit modern and contemporary artwork in the main galleries alongside the Usher collection. In 2014, prints by Andy Warhol, Pablo Picasso, Salvador Dalí and Henri Matisse from the touring show Modern Masters went on display at the gallery. In 2013 the conceptual artist and academic Raimi Gbadamosi was invited to curate the rehang display What's Going On, featuring loans from the Arts Council Collection and the British Art Medal Society and works by the contemporary artists Edward Allington, Kimathi Donkor, Amanda Francis, Permindar Kaur, Taslim Martin, Janette Parris, Ritu Sood, Susan Stockwell, Maiko Tsutsumi and Mark Woods.

== Gulbenkian Prize ==
In May 2006, The Collection was on a short list of four innovative museums being considered for the 2006 Gulbenkian Prize. The prize was awarded to the SS Great Britain.

== Possible closure of the Usher ==
Under proposals made by Lincolnshire County Council in 2019, the Usher Gallery could have been closed and the building turned into a wedding venue. The authority said it would look at moving some of the artwork to the neighbouring museum. The plans were criticised by art lovers. The county council was looking to save around £750,000 each year from its heritage budget. The council said it would save £100,000 per annum by ceasing to run the Usher as an art gallery. On 2 April 2019 a public meeting was held at Lincoln Minster School to discuss the issue, and on 13 April an art march was held.

Following discussions between the county council and the City of Lincoln Council, it was agreed that the Usher Gallery will remain open but the lease will be amended to enable third-party hire and ceremonies, and Lincoln's museum and art collections will remain in Lincolnshire.
