= Greyfriars, Lincoln =

Franciscan friary in Lincoln, United Kingdom

The Greyfriars, Lincoln
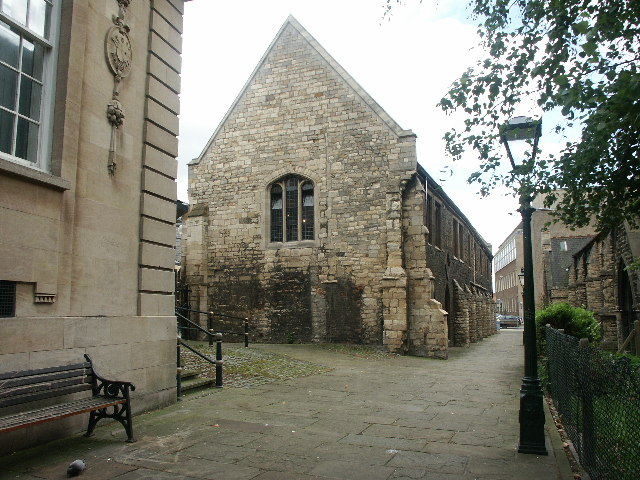
- The Greyfriars, Lincoln

- Location in Lincolnshire
- 53.2293°N 0.5370°W
- Location: Lincolnshire
- OS grid reference: SK9775971248

History
- Founded: c.1230
- Built: 13th century, with mid-19th-century additions.

Site notes
- Architect: William Watkins
- Architectural style: Early English architecture
- Restored: 1906

Listed Building – Grade I
- Official name: Greyfriars' Museum
- Designated: 8 October 1953
- Reference no.: 1388472

The Greyfriars, Lincoln was a Franciscan friary in Lincolnshire, England. The surviving building is the remains of the infirmary of the friary, built of dressed stone and brick and dating from c.1230, with mid-19th-century additions. The clay tile roof of the main building is in a poor condition and the Welsh slate roof of the 19th-century extension has been repaired.

== History ==
=== Franciscan Friary ===
Building of the Friary was started in 1237 on land donated to the Franciscan order and was completed by the 1280s. The community was expelled in 1538 as part of the Dissolution of the Monasteries.

=== Burials in the friary ===
- Lady Alice de Roos (daughter of William de Ros of Helmsley), wife of John Comyn I of Badenoch

=== Grammar School and Mechanics' Institute ===
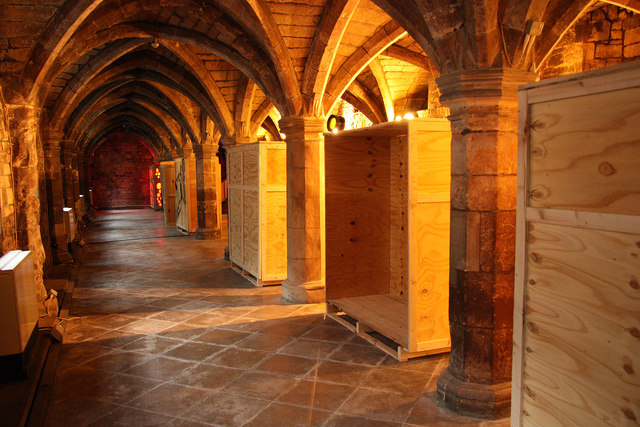
The Undercroft

The building was let to William Monson, whose son Richard opened a school there in 1568. From 1574 the school became the Corporation Grammar School run by Lincoln City Council on the upper floor until 1900. The undercroft was successively used as a spinning school which became known as the Jersey School until 1831, a Mechanics' Institute from 1833 to 1862 and as part of the Grammar School from 1862 to 1899. George Boole participated in the Mechanics' Institute.

== City and County Museum ==
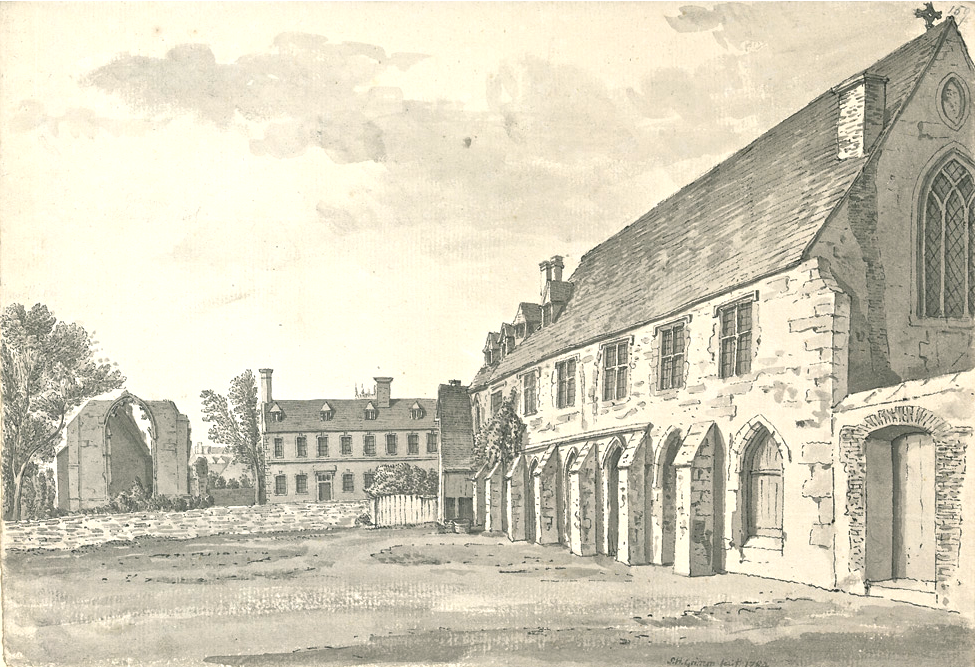
The ruins of St Swithin's Church and the Greyfriars, Lincoln c.1784

=== Under Lincoln City Council ===
In 1900 the building ceased to be used as a school. It was restored under the supervision of Lincoln architect William Watkins. It was opened to the public as the City and County Museum on 22 May 1907. The Museum was administered by the City of Lincoln and the first Curator was Arthur Smith who retired in 1934 and was followed by F. T. (Tom) Baker, who was the son of the Lincoln architect Fred Baker.

=== Lincolnshire County Council ===
In 1974 control of the Museum passed to Lincolnshire County Council. In September 1993 the museum's use of Greyfriars changed with the building becoming a venue for annually changing exhibitions while its main collections underwent a programme of conservation and research in expectation of a new home being built. In 2005, The Collection opened on a new site on Danesgate, adjacent to the Usher Gallery, with the two being jointly managed as a cultural centre for art and archaeology.

After closure the building was used for a period by the Central Library, but from 2008 has been left vacant, apart from occasional use for contemporary art exhibitions and installations. In 2016 the city council considered selling the building.

A project, funded by £3m from organisations including the National Lottery Heritage Fund, will bring Greyfriars back into use. It is on Historic England's Heritage at Risk Register but it could reopen in 2026 as a venue for weddings, conferences and education, run by Heritage Lincolnshire.

== Literature ==
- Antram N (revised), Pevsner N & Harris J, (1989), The Buildings of England: Lincolnshire, Yale University Press. pp 508–9.
- Baker F.T. (1985) A Lifetime with Lincolnshire Archaeology Journal for Lincolnshire and Archaeology, Vol 20 and re-printed by the Society. ISBN 0904680541.
- Hayfield C (2006). Conservation Plan for the Greyfriars Building, Lincoln. Report for the City of Lincoln Council.
- Lee A (2019), The man who made the Museum: Arthur Smith and the founding of the Lincoln's City and County Museum. Part Two - the development of the Museum. Lincolnshire Past & Present, No. 115, Spring 2019, pp. 13–17.
- Little A G (1906), Grey Friars of Lincoln in Victoria County History of the County of Lincoln, Vol II (ed. W. Page) pp. 222–4.
- Leach A.F. (1906), Schools-Lincoln Grammar School in Victoria County History of the County of Lincoln, Vol II (ed. W. Page) 421-443
- Martin A R (1935), "The Greyfriars of Lincoln", Archaeological Journal Vol 92, pg 42–63.
- Moore C. N. (1972), City and County Museum, Lincoln. 24pp
- Moore (C)N. (2024) Lincoln’s Grammar School that was never built in Walker A (ed) Learning in Lincoln : A History of the City’s Education Buildings . pp. 43–48.
- Padley J.S., (1851) Selections from the Ancient Monastic Ecclesiastical and Domestic edifices of Lincolnshire, Lincoln.
- Robson, Michael (2010). "The Greyfriars of Lincoln, c.1230–1330: the Establishment of the Friary and the Friars' Ministry and Life in the City and its Environs". In Robson, Michael; Röhrkasten, Jens (eds.). Franciscan Organisation in the Mendicant Context: Formal and Informal Structures of the Friars' Lives and Ministry in the Middle Ages. Berlin, Germany: Lit. pp. 119–146. ISBN 978-3-643-10820-3.
- Saul, Nigel (July 2020). "King Henry III: The Rise to Power and Personal Rule, 1207-1258". History Today. 70 (7): 94–97.
- Simpson E. Mansel (1903) The Grey Friary, Lincoln Lincolnshire Notes and Queries, pp193–202.
- Stocker D.A. (1984), The remains of the Franciscan friary in Lincoln, York Archaeological Papers, York Archaeological Trust, 135–137.
- Watkins W & Son (1903) Report on the Proposed Conversion of the building known as "The Greyfriars" to the purposes of a Museum, with a brief account of the Archaeological History of the Structure Lincoln Corporation.7pp.
