= No. 576 Squadron RAF =

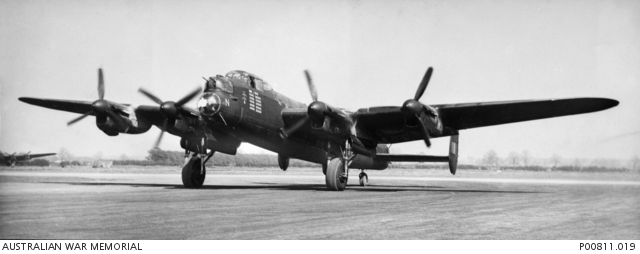
- 576 Squadron Avro Lancaster at RAF Fiskerton, 1945
- Active: 25 Nov 1943 – 13 Sep 1945
- Country: United Kingdom
- Branch: Royal Air Force
- Role: Bomber squadron
- Part of: No. 1 Group, RAF Bomber Command
- Mottos: Latin: Carpe Diem (Translation: "Seize the opportunity" or "Pluck the day")

Insignia
- Squadron Badge heraldry: A merlin, wings inverted and addorsed, preying on a serpent The squadron had its aircraft fitted with Merlin engines and the badge is symbolic of the unit seeking out and destroying its prey
- Squadron Codes: UL (Nov 1943 – Sep 1945)

Aircraft flown
- Bomber: Avro Lancaster; Four-engined heavy bomber

No. 576 Squadron RAF was a Royal Air Force Second World War heavy bomber squadron.

== History ==
No. 576 Squadron was formed on 25 November 1943 at RAF Elsham Wolds in Lincolnshire under the command of Wing Commander G.T.B Clayton DFC. "A" Flight was formed under Squadron Leader Dilworth and composed of 4 experienced aircrews drawn from 101 Squadron, with the remainder drawn from the Group 1 Heavy Conversion Units. "B" Flight was formed under Squadron Leader Attwater and consisted of 13 experienced aircrew and 9 aircraft from "C" Flight of 103 squadron.

No. 576 Squadron commenced operations in the night of 2/3 December 1943, when seven Avro Lancasters were sent out to bomb Berlin. FSGT John Booth RAAF and crew in UL-R2 (W4123) failed to return from this operation. Eleven months later No. 576 Squadron moved to RAF Fiskerton, a little way outside Lincoln. During its brief period of existence No. 576 Squadron operated only one type of aircraft, the Avro Lancaster four-engined heavy bomber. It carried out 2,788 operation sorties with the Lancaster, with the loss of 66 aircraft. The last bombs of the squadron were dropped on 25 April 1945, when 23 of the squadrons aircraft bombed Obersalzberg with no loss of personnel. During this period, No. 576 Squadron flew 2,788 operational sorties; 67 aircraft were lost, including two abandoned over France in February 1945. The Jamaican airman Billy Strachan, who would later become a pioneer of black civil rights in Britain, flew 15 operations as the pilot of an Avro Lancaster with the squadron.

No. 576 then took part in Operation Manna - the dropping of food supplies to the Dutch; Operation Exodus - repatriation of British ex-POWs to Great Britain; Operation Post Mortem - testing the efficiency of captured German early-warning radar; and Operation Dodge-the transport of British troops to Great Britain from Italy. No. 576 Squadron's last operation was part of Operation Manna in which 28 aircraft were detailed to drop food to the starving Dutch people in Rotterdam on 7 May 1945.

No. 576 Squadron was disbanded at Fiskerton on 13 September 1945.

== Aircraft operated ==
Aircraft operated by no. 576 Squadron, data from
From	To	Aircraft	Version
November 1943	September 1945	Avro Lancaster	Mks.I, III

=== Notable aircraft ===
Four of the Lancasters that flew with 576 squadron managed to survive one hundred operations or more:

No. 576 Squadron RAF aircraft with the most number of operations, data from
Serial no.	Name	Operations	Call-sign	Fate	Remarks
ED888	"Mike Squared"	140	UL-V2, UL-M2	Struck off charge, 8 January 1947	Flew 140 missions in total, initially with No. 103 Squadron RAF from April 1943, and then with 576 Squadron. The aircraft was returned to 103 Squadron when 576 moved to RAF Fiskerton and was re-coded PM-M2. This is the code which she is traditionally shown in, however most of her 140 operations were flown while at 576 Squadron.
ME801	"Nan"	114	UL-C2, UL-N2	Struck off charge, 16 October 1945	
LM594	"A Able"	104	UL-G2, UL-A2	Struck off charge, 13 February 1947	
LM227	"Item"	100	UL-I2	Struck off charge, 16 October 1945	

== Squadron bases ==
Bases and airfields used by no. 576 Squadron, data from
From	To	Base
25 November 1943	31 October 1944	RAF Elsham Wolds, Lincolnshire
31 October 1944	13 September 1945	RAF Fiskerton, Lincolnshire
