= Principle of nonvacuous contrast =

The principle of nonvacuous contrast is a logical or methodological principle which requires that a genuine predicate never refer to everything, or to nothing, within its universe of discourse. The implications of this is that for a predicate to be meaningful it can neither apply to all members of a group or to no members of the group.
