= Lincoln Mechanics' Institute =

Coordinates: 53°13′44.73″N 0°32′13.72″W

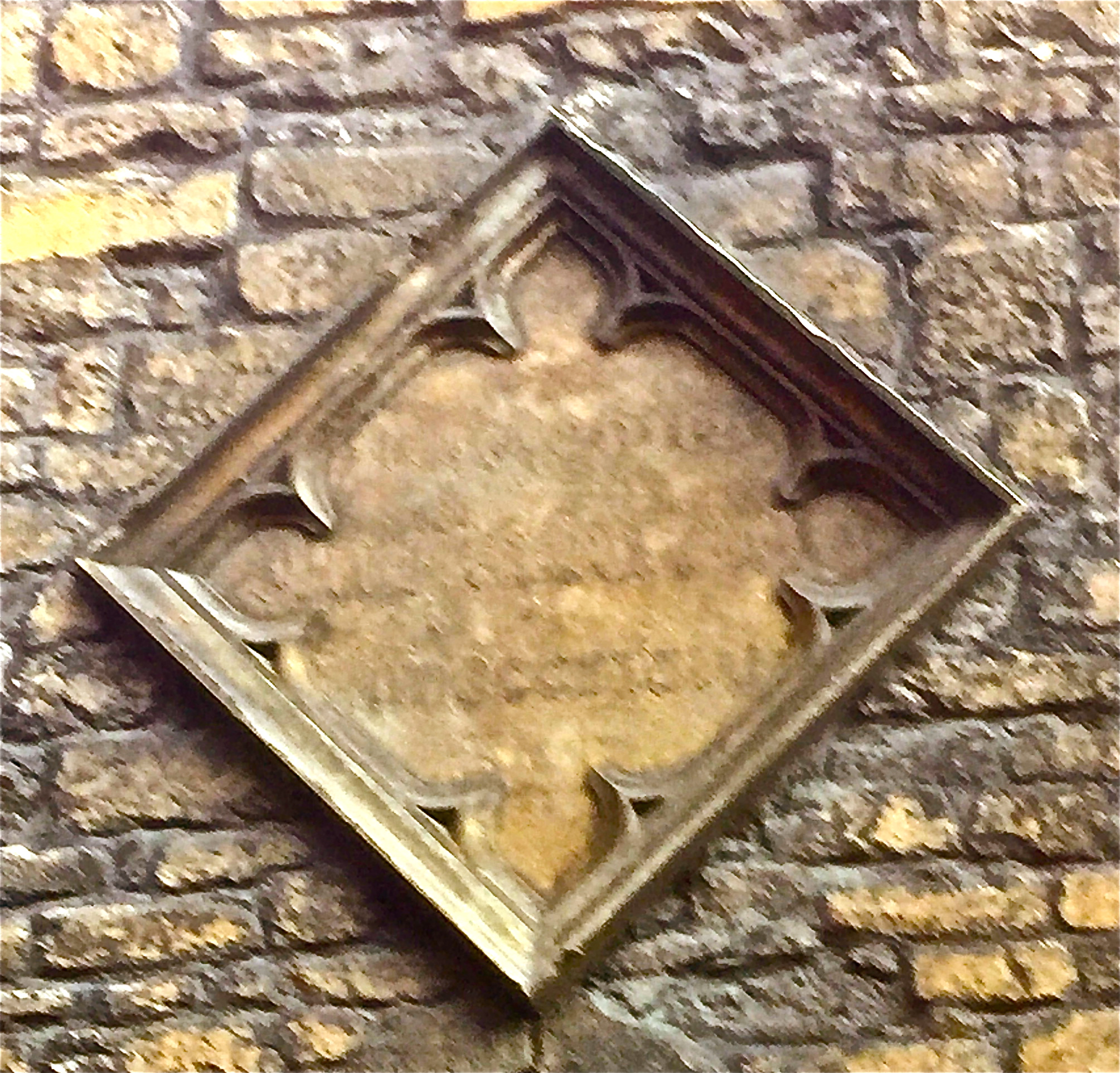
- Mechanics' Institution Plaque 1833 on Greyfriars, Lincoln
- Founder: The Earl of Yarborough, Lincoln City Council and Lincoln Literary Society
- Dissolved: 1899
- Purpose: providing education for the working man and apprentices for learning and betterment

The Lincoln Mechanics' Institute or Lincoln and Lincolnshire Mechanics' Institute was founded in Lincoln, England in 1833. It was one of the many Mechanics' institutes which sprang up in the early 19th century and was the first Mechanics' Institute to be founded in Lincolnshire.

The Institutes provided education for the working man through lending libraries, lecture theatres, class rooms and laboratories and often included courses and technical materials, and wider opportunities for learning and betterment. By the 1850s there were around 1,200 institutes in Great Britain, though some were known by different names, including Literary and Scientific Institutes, Reading Rooms, Useful Knowledge Societies, Athenaeums and Lyceums. However, after the creation of public libraries following the Public Libraries Act 1850 and the establishment of secondary and technical schools, Mechanics' Institutes either closed or changed into other institutions. Today only one Mechanics’ Institute remains in Lincolnshire, at Epworth.

The Lincoln Mechanics’ Institute was housed in the undercroft of the Lincoln Greyfriars. At the time of its creation in 1833 it was merged with the Lincoln Literary Society. The undercroft contained schoolrooms, a library and a museum. The undercroft was leased to the Institute by the City Council and in 1862 the city council required the undercroft for the expansion of the Grammar School. The institute was then moved to larger premises in the City Assembly Rooms above the Buttermarket, adjacent to the St Peter at Arches Church. In 1892 the City Council decided to use these premises for a City Library and in 1896 the Mechanics' Institute was dissolved. At that time there were 600 members of the institute.

The Lincoln Mechanics’ Institute was closely connected with several prominent men: George Boole, mathematician and creator of Boolean algebra; the Earl of Yarbourough; Charles Seely, the Liberal politician and industrialist; Edward Parker Charlesworth, known as an innovator in psychiatric treatment; and Thomas Cooper, the Chartist leader.

== Creation of the Lincoln Mechanics' Institute. ==
The lead in establishing the Mechanics' Institute was taken by the Lincoln Literary Society and supported by the Earl of Yarborough and his son Charles Anderson-Pelham M.P., a reforming Whig politician keen on the idea that That the establishment of Mechanics' Institutions has been productive of much good, by extending useful information, and by ameliorating and improving the character of the working classes.

It was proposed that the Lincoln Literary Society would merge with the newly created Mechanics' Institute and pass over to Mechanics' Institute its funds (about £50). If the merger was successful, the Earl would give a further £100. The Mayor of Lincoln agreed to call a meeting pursuant to the Requisition of 8 Aldermen and 176 Inhabitants of the City” on Thursday 7th October 1833 at the Guildhall. The proposal was that a “Mechanics' Institution be established in the City of Lincoln, having branches in the County, with accommodation for Lectures, Philosophical Apparatus, Library, and Museum, as the funds may admit. The chair at the meeting was taken by the Earl of Yarborough, who was keen to an establish a network of Mechanics Institutes in Lincolnshire. Initially it was called the Lincoln and Lincolnshire Mechanics Institute. A list of objectives for the institute was outlined and approved. Fund raising was started with the Earl of Yarbourgh contributing £50.

As the Undercroft of Greyfriars had been vacated by the Spinning School in 1831, the City offered this for the accommodation of the institute. Larger gatherings could be held in the Upper School Room, when not in use by the Grammar School. Considerable alterations to the ground floor were to take place to provide three teaching areas, a library with a museum area and the curator quarters. Sir Edward Ffrench Bromhead became the first president of the institute and the curator was John Boole, the father of George Boole.

The alterations must have proceeded quickly as by Tuesday 23 April 1834 the Institute held its first lecture by Dr Dionysius Lardner, FRS who demonstrated two working models of steam engines. Lardner, a leading figure in adult education, was an Irish scientific writer who popularised science and technology, and edited the 133-volume Cabinet Cyclopaedia. The choice of a lecture on steam engines may have been of some significance, as Lincoln became a leading centre for the manufacture of steam engines in the 1840s and 1850s. On the following Friday a Grand Ball was held in City Assembly Rooms on the High Street to raise money for the Mechanics' Institute and attended by the Earl of Yarborough, local MPs and leading citizens of Lincoln and the dancing was kept up with great spirit until a late hour in the morning. The ball became an annual fundraising event for the Mechanics' Institute.

== Later history at the Greyfriars ==
The 1830s was the great age of political reform and this is reflected in many statements made in connection with the Mechanics' Institute. Politics and peligion were to be avoided and there were disputes over views expressed in the Journals which were subscribed to for the institute's Library. The Earl of Yarborough and Sir Edward ffrench Bromhead were disparaging about "Trade Unions" believing that by educating the apprentices and workers, they would command a fair wage for their work. There was a range of political views held by the committee and the subscribing members of the institute. In 1845 the Rector of South Hykeham writes to the Lincolnshire Chronicle that the Lincoln Mechanics' Institute is degenerating into Radical club-house, and that free-trade and revolutionary doctrines are promulgated in defiance of the wholesome rule forbidding the introduction of politics and controversial divinity. The Rector's accusation stemmed from the purchase of a copy of Wise Saws and Modern Instances by Thomas Cooper, a former committee member of the institute, who had now become a leading Chartist. He had written the book while imprisoned in Stafford gaol. The book itself is an innocuous description mainly about life in Lincoln and the Lincolnshire countryside, but it is condemned by the Rector because it has been written by a "Chartist". He goes on to condemn the Institute because the Earl of Yarbough is a Whig/Radical, George Boole "not Conservative", Mr Keyworth ultra-radical and the elected officers of the institute led him to conclude that intelligence and respectability are properties exclusively in the possession of anti-Conservatives. Sir Francis Hill points out that the ultra-Tory Lincoln MP Charles Waldo Sibthorp and the cathedral and local clergy were conspicuous by not supporting the Mechanics' Institute.

With the 1846 opening of a Midland Railway rail route from Lincoln St. Marks railway station to Nottingham and Derby, the Mechanics' Institute appears to have started organising rail excursions and the following appeared in the Lincolnshire Chronicle, The Lincoln mechanics' institute have in contemplation to arrange for an excursion train to Derby, on the re-opening of the Derby Arboretum, thus affording the members of the institution, and the citizens generally, the opportunity of visiting Nottingham and Derby for a trifling cost. (This was five years after Thomas Cook had run his first rail excursion from Leicester to Loughborough). Also in 1846 the Mechanics' Institute, reflecting the growth of engineering in Lincoln, announced that they were appointing a teacher of mechanical and geometrical drawing, with view of affording to artizans and apprentices the means of making themselves acquainted with the use of a pencil their respective occupations.

== At the Buttermarket and dissolution of the Mechanics’ Institute ==
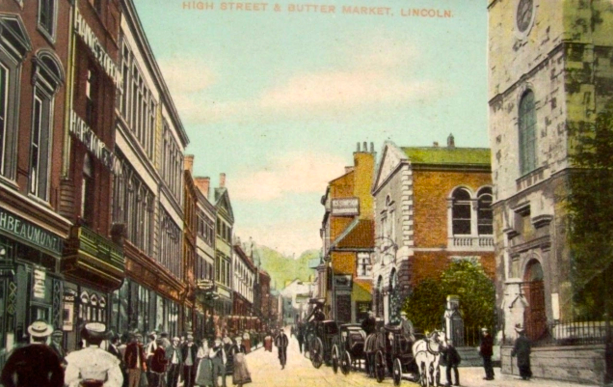
View of Lincoln High Street with St Peter's Church and Buttermarket on right

The Mechanics' Institute continued in the Greyfriars until 1863, when it was given larger premises in the City Assembly Rooms on the High Street, along with the Library and Museum. In 1892 the City gave notice to the Mechanics' Institute as it wished to use part of the Assembly rooms as the City Public Library which moved to Free School Lane in 1906. The Mechanics' Institute was finally dissolved in 1899, the desks passed to the Lincoln Grammar School and the Library was sold. The remains of the Mechanics' Museum returned to the Greyfriars with the formation of the City and County Museum.

== Notable members of the Mechanics' Institute ==
=== George Boole (1815-1864) ===
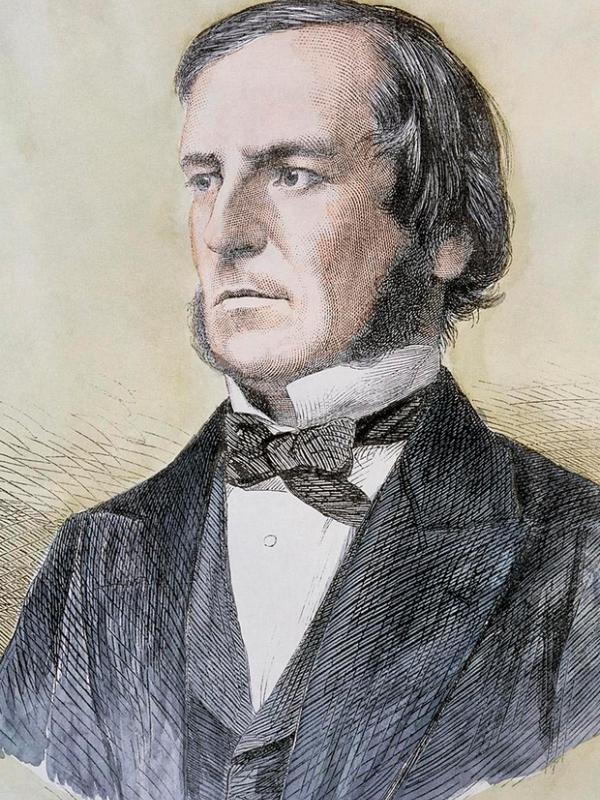
George Boole

George Boole must be considered the most important person associated with the Lincoln Mechanics' Institute. In 1854 he published The Laws of Thought which provided the basis for Boolean Algebra and the framework for modern Information Technology. Boole was born and lived in nearby Silver street. He did not attend the grammar school but Bainbridge's commercial academy in St Michael's Lane before training as a teacher. His father was the first Curator of the Mechanics’ Institute. George Boole gave many lectures and was an "instructor" for mathematics. While George Boole was largely self taught, he was also encouraged and lent books by Sir Edward Bromhead, chairman of the Mechanics' Institute and a notable mathematician. At the time he was recognised by the institute as youthful prodigy. In April 1835 when the Mechanics' Institute was presented a bust of Sir Isaac Newton by the Earl of Yarborough he gave a lecture to the Mechanics' Institute on Newton and The hope expressed by the excellent President Sir Edw. Ffrench Bromhead, at the close of the lecture, said that Mr. G. Boole would go on in the course he had commenced, and one day be an honor to Lincoln, was we believe echoed by every breast We trust that many youths present would also feel the spring of laudable ambition touched within them, while listening to honourable testimonies and encomiums thus given to genius and industry. The noble Patron (Earl of Yarborough) also gave a handsome testimony to the powers of the youthful lecturer.

At the age of 19, in 1834, Boole set up his own school in Free School Lane, close to the Greyfriars and in 1838 he moved to Waddington where he took over Hall's Academy before opening his own ‘Boarding School for Young Gentlemen’ in 1840, at Pottergate, Lincoln. Boole became a prominent local figure in Lincoln, an admirer of John Kaye, the bishop. He took part in the local campaign for early closing and reduction of shop workers hours in Lincoln and also the establishment of the Penitent Females Home. In 1847, with the Rev Edward Larken and others, he set up a building society in Lincoln. He associated with the Chartist, Thomas Cooper who was married to his cousin Susannah Chaloner.

Boole could read French, German and Italian, and, aged 16, read Lacroix's Calcul Différentiel, a book given to him by Rev. George Stevens Dickson, rector of St Swithin's church. In 1838, Boole worked in Waddington on his first paper for publication, On Certain Theorems in the Calculus of Variations, prompted by his reading of Lagrange's Mécanique Analytique. He published a paper on the mathematical basis of logic, which was published in the Mechanics’ Magazine in 1848.

=== Charles Seely (1803-1887) ===
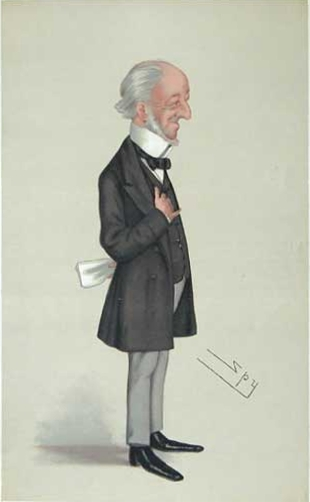
Charles Seely, Vanity Fair, 21 December 1878

A member of the Committee of the Mechanics’ Institute from 1834 until it moved to the Buttermarket in 1862, Seely was an industrialist and Liberal politician, who served as an MP for Lincoln from 1847 to 1848 and again from 1861 to 1885. He was born in Lincoln and became one of the wealthiest industrialists of the Victorian era. He was a miller who built a large mill on the Brayford. He purchased coal-mines in Derbyshire and eventually purchased extensive estates in the Isle of Wight.

=== Thomas Michael Keyworth (1800-1858) ===
Described as an "Ultra-Radical", Keyworth was a Lincoln wine merchant, who was the business partner of Charles Seely from 1835 onwards and involved in the opening of Lincoln's first steam mill in 1836. He was a partner in Clayton & Shuttleworth’s engineering company and played a prominent part in Lincoln politics. He was Chairman of the Lincoln Corn and Market Hall Company until his death in 1858.

=== Thomas Cooper (1805–1892) ===
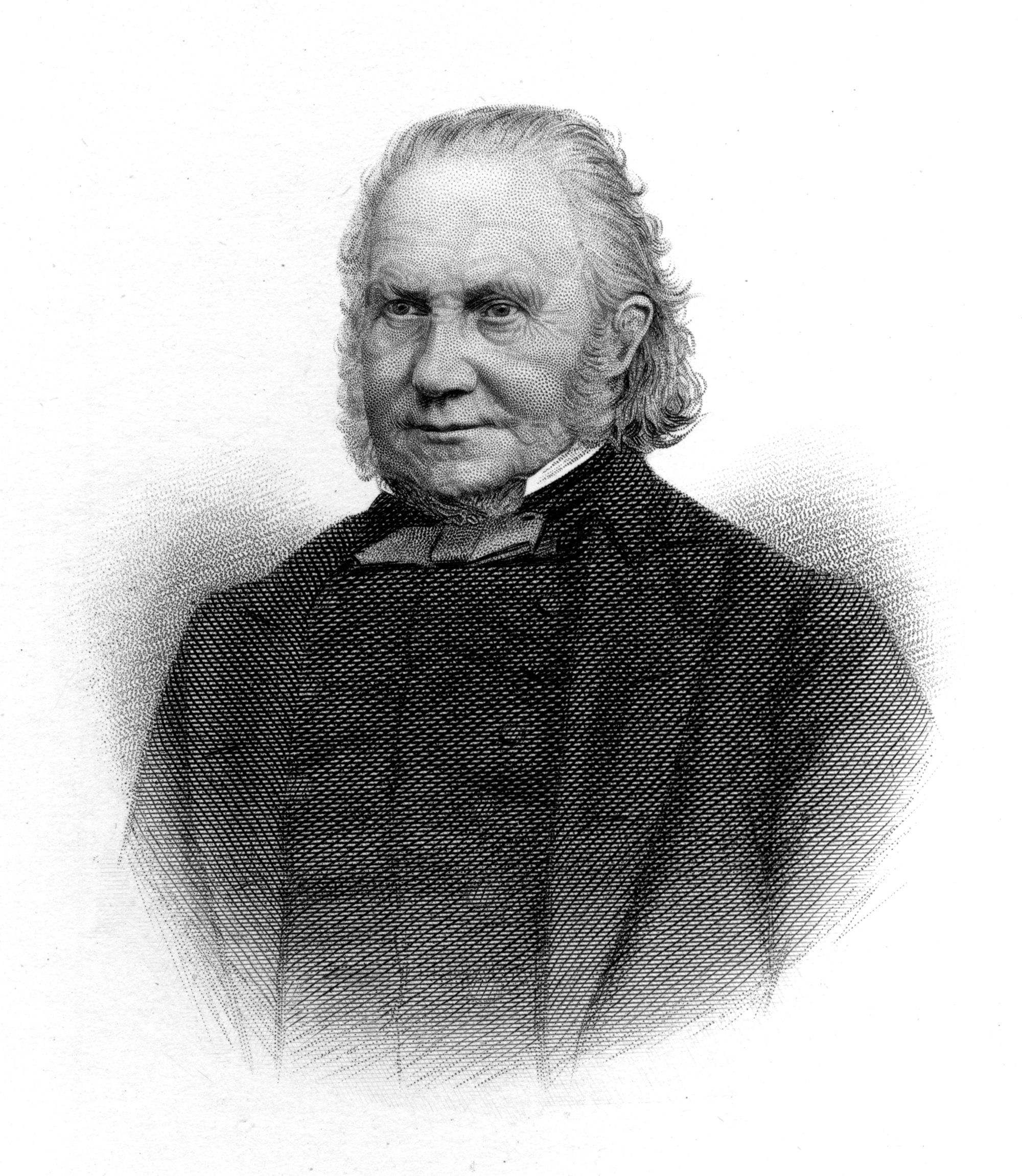
Thomas Cooper, poet and Chartist

A poet and leading Chartist, married to Susannah Chaloner, a cousin of George Boole, Thomas Cooper joined the Lincoln Mechanics' Institute in 1834 and shortly afterwards was on the Committee of the Institute. He probably continued on the Committee until he left Lincoln in 1838. His prison rhyme the "Purgatory of Suicides" (1845) runs to 944 stanzas. He is commemorated in Lincoln by the Thomas Cooper Memorial Chapel in the High Street.

=== Edward Parker Charlesworth (1783–1853) ===
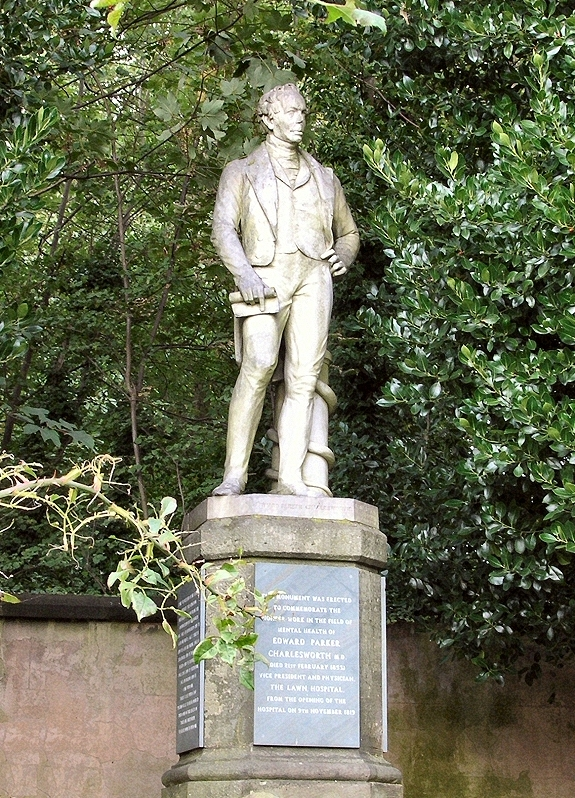
Charlesworth statue, Lincoln

Chairman of the Mechanics' Institute for nearly twenty years, Edward Parker Charlesworth was a surgeon at Lincoln Hospital and a visiting physician at Lincoln Asylum for the Insane (The Lawn). Charlesworth won national recognition for his removal of restraint procedures for mentally ill patients and worked closely with Richard Gardiner Hill (Physician to the Lincoln Dispensary) who gave a public lecture outlining the new methods of treatment to the Mechanics' Institute in 1838.

== Bibliography ==
- Acton M and Roberts S. (2019), Charles Seely of Lincoln. Liberalism and Making Money in Victorian England Kindle Publishing.
- Lesley Clarke George Boole and the Lincoln Mechanics’ Institute, "George Boole’s Lincoln, 1815-49", Ed . Andrew Walker for the Survey of Lincoln, 2019.
- Lesley Clarke (2024) The Premises of the Mechanics Institute in "Learning in Lincoln: A History of the City's Education Buildings" Ed.Andrew Walker for the Survey of Lincoln
- English Heritage (2017) Mechanics’ Institutes: Introductions to Heritage Assets, December 2017.
- Russell Rex C. (1994) Living and Learning in Lindsey, Lincolnshire: 1830-1890 - A History of Adult Education in North Lincolnshire. The University of Hull.
- Walker A. ed. (2019) George Boole’s Lincoln, 1815-49, Survey of Lincoln.
- Walker M (2018)The Development of the Mechanics’ Institute Movement in Britain and Beyond:Supporting further education for the adult working classes. Routledge, ISBN 9781138489578
