= Julian Taylor =

Julian Taylor may refer to:

- Julian Taylor (singer), Canadian singer-songwriter
- Julian Taylor (surgeon) (1889–1961), British neurological surgeon and former vice-president of the Royal College of Surgeons
- Jullian Taylor, American football defensive tackle
