= Laws of logic =

Law of logic may refer to:

- Basic laws of Propositional Logic or First Order Predicate Logic
- Rules of inference, which dictate the valid use of inferential reasoning
- Laws of thought, an old way to refer to three logical principles.
