= Thomas Cooper (poet) =

English poet, novelist, and Chartist (1805–1892)

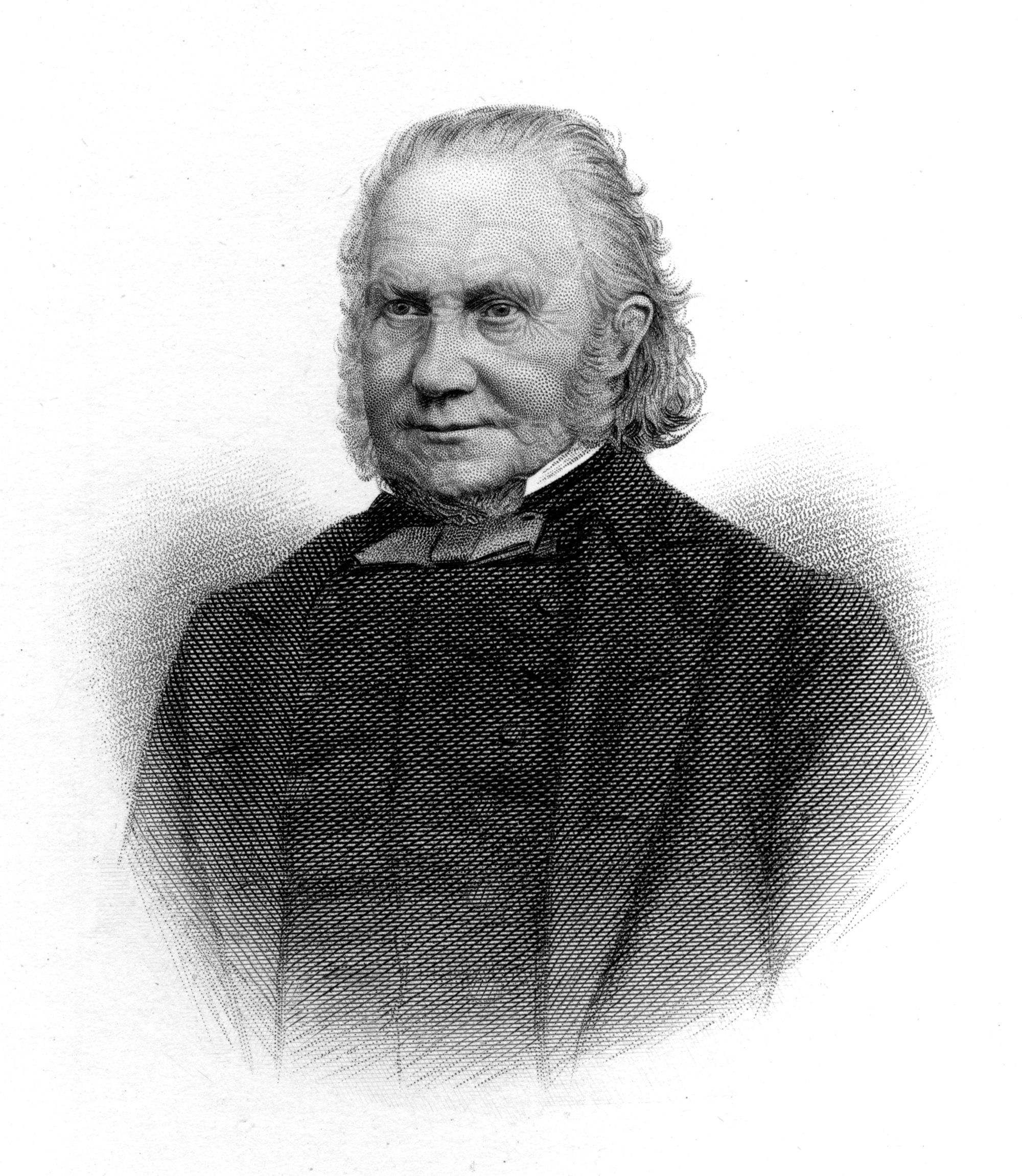
- Thomas Cooper; Engraving by John Cochran
- Born: 20 March 1805; Leicester, England
- Died: 12 July 1892 (aged 87); Lincoln, England
- Writing career
- Language: English
- Genre: Poetry
- Movement: Chartism

Thomas Cooper (20 March 1805 – 15 July 1892) was an English poet and a leading Chartist. His prison rhyme the Purgatory of Suicides (1845) runs to 944 stanzas. He also wrote novels and in later life religious texts. He was self-educated and worked as a shoemaker, then a preacher, a schoolmaster and a journalist, before taking up Chartism in 1840. He was seen as a passionate, determined and fiery man.

== Early years ==
Cooper was born in Leicester, the son of a working dyer. After his father's death, his mother began business as a dyer and fancy box-maker at Gainsborough, Lincolnshire, and young Cooper was apprenticed to a shoemaker. In spite of hardships and difficulties, he managed to educate himself, and at the age of 23, having been a shoemaker in Gainsborough, managed to open a school there in 1827. He had moved to Lincoln by 1834 and married Susannah Chaloner, a cousin of George Boole in that year. His wife died in 1880. He joined the Lincoln Mechanics' Institute in 1834 and shortly afterwards was on the Committee of Institute. He probably remained on it until he left Lincoln in 1838.

== Chartist leader and lecturer ==
After journal work in Lincoln and London, where he for a couple of months edited "The Kentish Mercury" from Greenwich, Cooper joined the staff of the Leicestershire Mercury in 1840 and moved to Leicester. Leicester under his leadership became a Chartist stronghold, with its own journals, such as the Commonwealthman, and a school for adults. He became a leader and lecturer among them and in 1843 was imprisoned in Stafford for two years after inciting riots in the Staffordshire Potteries in 1842. He used this time to write his Purgatory of Suicides, a political epic. However, Cooper abandoned full-time radicalism on his release.

In his efforts to publish his work after his liberation Cooper came to the notice of Benjamin Disraeli and Douglas Jerrold. With Jerrold's help, the work appeared in 1845, and Cooper then turned his attention to lecturing on historical and educational subjects.

== Writing and lecturing ==
While working on various papers, Cooper in 1850 ran Cooper's Journal, but only a few issues appeared. At the same time he adopted sceptical views, which he continued to hold until 1855, when he reconverted to Christianity, joined the Baptists, and was a preacher among them. According to his autobiography, he publicly announced his recovered faith during a lecture at London's Hall of Science on 13 January 1856, and began to challenge sceptics to debate. Though still calling himself a Chartist, he sought to earn a living and a reputation as a writer. In addition to his poems, he wrote several novels, although those like Alderman Ralph (1853) failed on both counts.

Although he had abandoned his religious beliefs at the time of his imprisonment, Cooper's next 30 years were spent as a lecturer in defence of Christianity, attacking the evolutionary theories of Charles Darwin and Ernst Haeckel. He authored Evolution, The Stone Book, and The Mosaic Record of Creation (1878), which argued for creationism and rejected evolution.

Cooper was impulsive, but an honest, sincere man. His autobiography (1872) is seen as a minor Victorian classic. In his later years he settled into being an old-fashioned Radical. His friends in 1867 raised an annuity for him, and in the last year of his life he received a government pension. He died in Lincoln on 15 July 1892 and was buried there.

== Legacy ==
The Thomas Cooper Memorial Baptist Church in Lincoln, built in 1972, is named in his honour. Its previous 1886 building was known as the Thomas Cooper Memorial Mission.

== Works ==
Cooper's main works were:

- Wise Saws and Modern Instances, London, 1845; written in Stafford jail
- Two Orations against Taking Away Human Life, 1846, on non-resistance
- The Baron's Yule Feast, London, 1846
- Land for the Labourers, London, 1848
- Captain Cobler: or, The Lincolnshire Rebellion : an historical romance of the reign of Henry VIII, London, 1850
- Bridge of History over the Gulf of Time, London, 1871
- Life of Thomas Cooper, written by Himself, London, 1872
- Plain Pulpit Talk, London, 1872
- God, the Soul, and a Future State, London, 1873
- Paradise of Martyrs, London, 1873
- Old-fashioned Stories, London, 1874. New York, 1893
- Evolution, The Stone Book, and The Mosaic Record of Creation, London, 1878
- Atonement, second series of Plain Pulpit Talk, London, 1880
- Thoughts at Four Score, London, 1885

Cooper's Poetical Works were published in London, 1877.

== Sources ==
- Stephen Roberts (2008), The Chartist Prisoners: the Radical Lives of Thomas Cooper (1805–1892) and Arthur O'Neill (1819–1896)
- People's Charter
