= Robert Angus Smith =

British chemist (1817–84)

Robert Angus Smith FRS
- Born: 15 February 1817; Glasgow
- Died: 12 May 1884 (aged 67)
- Education: University of Glasgow
- Occupation: chemist
- Employer: Royal Manchester Institution

Robert Angus Smith (15 February 1817 – 12 May 1884), commonly referred to as Angus Smith, was a Scottish chemist, who investigated numerous environmental issues. He is known for his research on air pollution in 1852, in the course of which he discovered what came to be known as acid rain. He is sometimes referred to as the 'Father of Acid Rain'.

== Education and early life ==
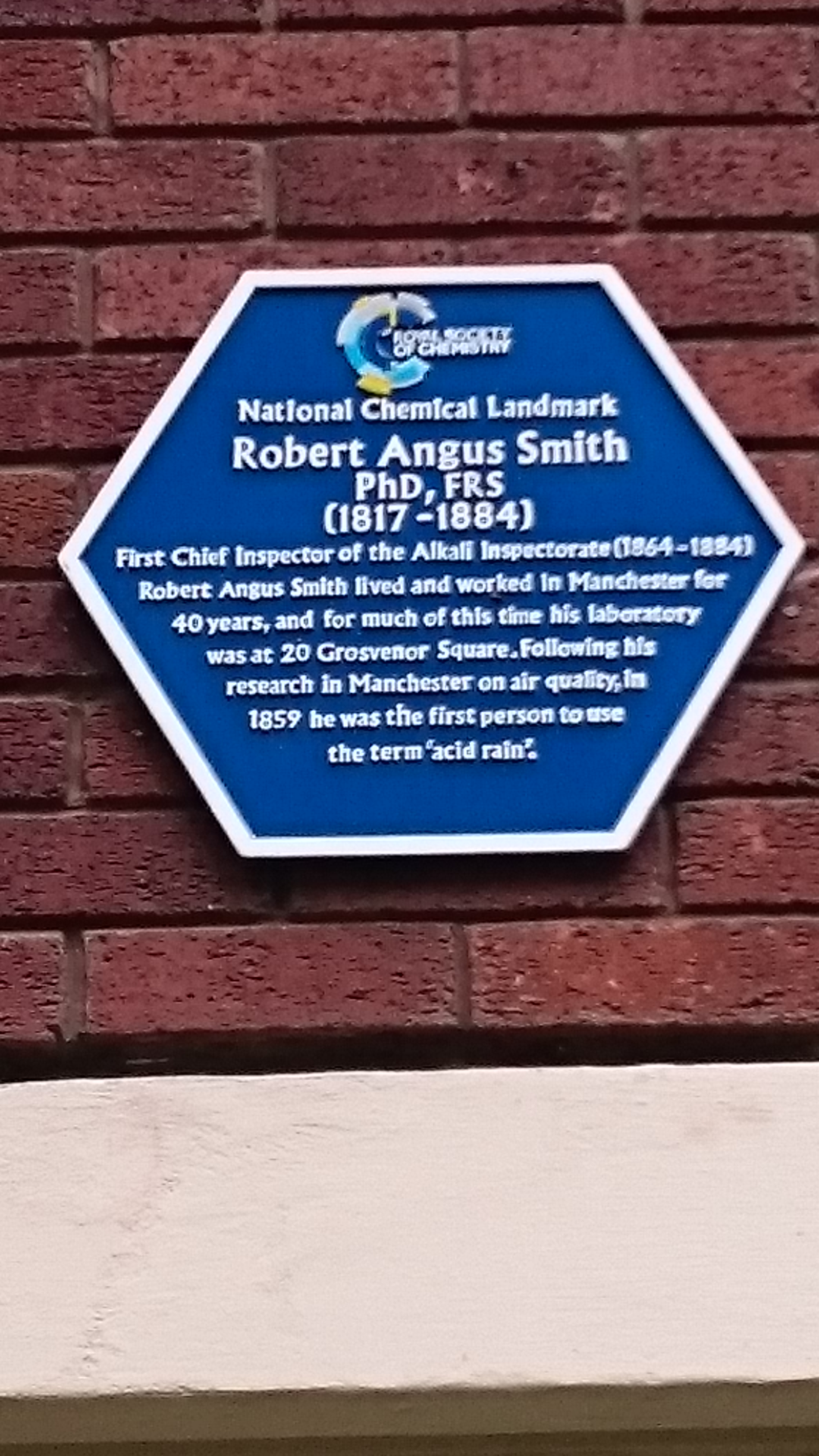
A Royal Society of Chemistry Blue plaque commemorating Smith in Grosvenor Square Manchester, the site of Smith's laboratory

Born at Pollokshaws, Glasgow, Smith was educated at the University of Glasgow in preparation for ministry in the Church of Scotland but left before graduating. He worked as a personal tutor and, accompanying a family to Gießen in 1839, he stayed on in Germany to study chemistry supervised by Justus von Liebig, earning a PhD in 1841.

== Career and research ==
On returning to England the same year, he again considered Holy Orders but instead was attracted to Manchester to join the chemical laboratory of Lyon Playfair at the Royal Manchester Institution. Here he became involved in some of the environmental issues of the world's first industrial city (see History of Manchester). Playfair left for greener pastures in 1845 and Smith worked at making a living as an independent analytical chemist. After some initial alarming experiences, Smith refused to take on expert witness work which was a staple of consulting scientists of the day and which he saw as corrupt. Consequently, when the Alkali Inspectorate was established by the Alkali Act 1863, Smith's integrity made him the natural candidate. As Queen Victoria's Inspector of Alkali Works, he was the prototype of the scientific civil servant. He held the post until his death. He is buried in the graveyard of St Paul's Church on Kersal Moor, Salford

In 1872 Smith published the book Air and Rain: The Beginnings of a Chemical Climatology, which presents his studies of the chemistry of atmospheric precipitation. These studies include the discovery, in 1852, of acid rain in northern British cities, a consequence of the burning of coal rich in sulfur. He was conferred with Honorary Membership of the Institution of Engineers and Shipbuilders in Scotland in 1884. After his death his collection of about 4,000 books was acquired by the library of Owens College, Manchester. They are now in the John Rylands University Library, the successor of the college library.

== Spiritualism ==
Smith with his friend William Crookes, attended a séance on 21 April 1870 in London. He sent Crookes 15 letters on spiritualism between April 1869 and 1871. Smith did not choose to write widely about spiritualism as he believed it might damage his scientific reputation. He was a member of the Society for Psychical Research from 1882 to 1884. After he died, 89 books on the occult were discovered in his library.

== Awards and honours ==
Smith was elected a Fellow of the Royal Society (FRS) in 1857. He was elected to membership of The Manchester Literary and Philosophical Society on 29 January 1845, becoming Secretary of the Society1852–57 and President Society 1864–66

== Publications ==
- On Sewage and Sewage Rivers (1855)
- Disinfectants and Disinfection (1869)
- Air and Rain: The Beginnings of a Chemical Climatology (1872)
- Chemical and Physical Researches (1876)
- Loch Etive and the sons of Uisnach: With Illustrations (1879)
- A Centenary of Science in Manchester (1883)

== Bibliography ==
- Eyler, J. (1980). "The Conversion of Angus Smith: the Changing Role of Chemistry and Biology in Sanitary Science, 1850–1880". Bulletin of the History of Medicine. 54 (2): 216–34. PMID 6994850.
- Kargon, R. H. (1977). Science in Victorian Manchester: Enterprise and Expertise. Baltimore: Johns Hopkins University Press. ISBN 0-8018-1969-5.
- MacLeod, R. M. (1965). "The Alkali Acts Administration, 1863–84: The Emergence of the Civil Scientist". Victorian Studies. 9: 85–112.
- Reed, Peter. Acid rain and the rise of the environmental chemist in nineteenth-century Britain: the life and work of Robert Angus Smith (Routledge, 2016).

Professional and academic associations
Preceded by Edward William Binney	President of the Manchester Literary and Philosophical Society; 1864–66	Succeeded by Henry Edward Schunck
Preceded by Henry Halford Jones	Secretary of the Manchester Literary and Philosophical Society; 1852–57	Succeeded by Henry Edward Schunck
