= George Boole =

English mathematician and philosopher (1815–1864)

George Boole FRS
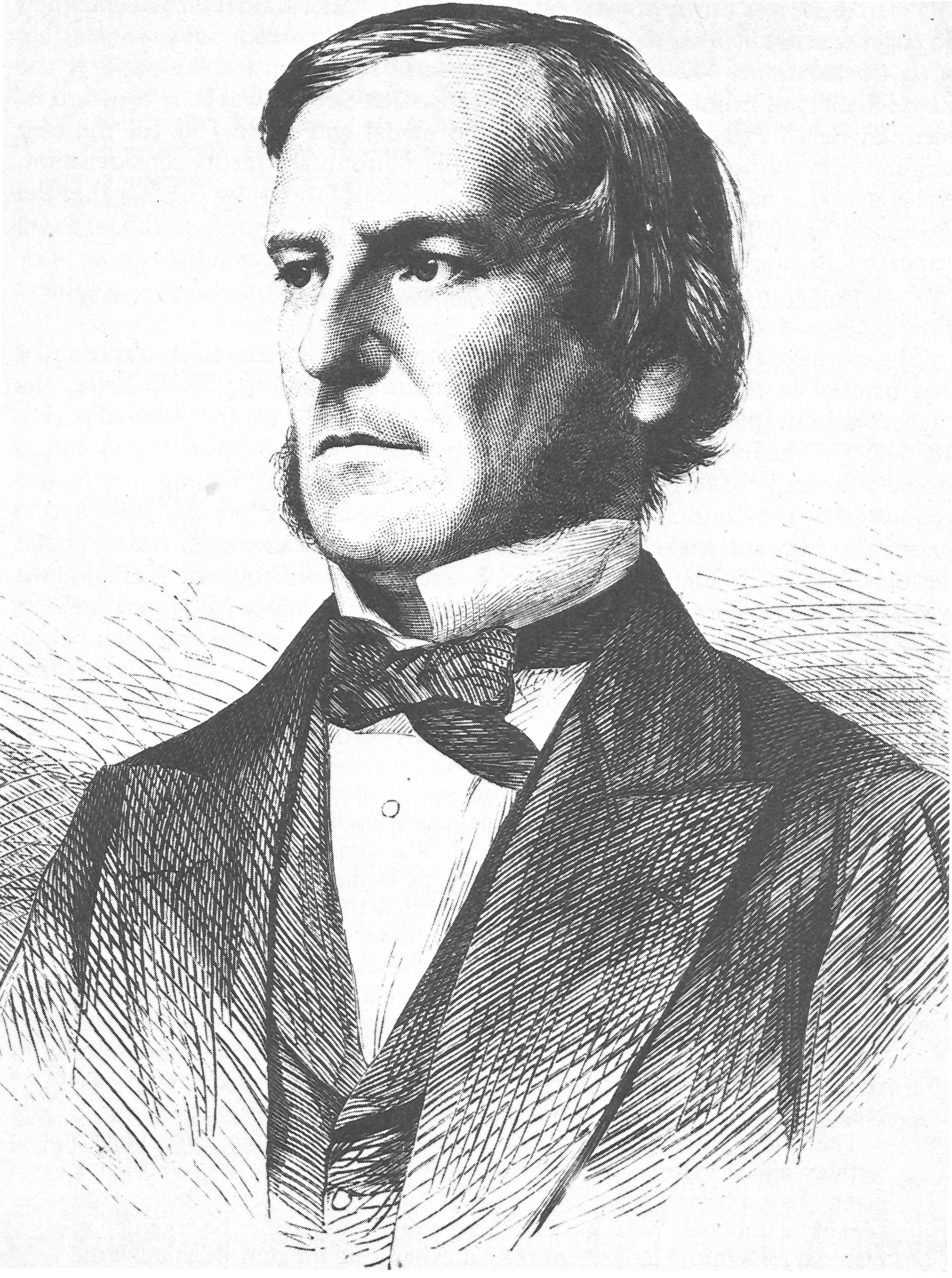
- Portrait of Boole, from The Illustrated London News, 21 January 1865
- Born: 2 November 1815; Lincoln, England
- Died: 8 December 1864 (aged 49); Ballintemple, Cork, Ireland
- Known for: Boolean algebra; Boole's expansion theorem; Boolean function; Boole's inequality; Boolean polynomials; Boolean ring; Boole's rule; Abstract algebraic logic; Invariant theory; Wholistic reference
- Spouse: Mary Everest (m. 1855)
- Awards: Royal Medal (1844); Keith Medal (1855–1857); FRS (1857)

Education
- Education: Bainbridge's Commercial Academy

Philosophical work
- Era: 19th-century philosophy
- Discipline: Mathematics
- Region: Western philosophy
- School: British algebraic logic
- Institutions: Lincoln Mechanics' Institute; Free School Lane, Lincoln; Queen's University, Cork
- Main interests: Mathematics, logic, philosophy of mathematics

George Boole (/buːl/ BOOL; 2 November 1815 – 8 December 1864) was an English mathematician and philosopher often credited with revolutionizing logic by transforming it from a philosophical study of language into a mathematical system of algebraic equations using binary values and logical operators.

Boole was the son of a shoemaker. He received a primary school education and learned Latin and modern languages through various means. At 16, he began teaching to support his family. He established his own school at 19 and later ran a boarding school in Lincoln. Boole was an active member of local societies and collaborated with fellow mathematicians. In 1849, he was appointed the first professor of mathematics at Queen’s College, Cork (now University College Cork) in Ireland, where he worked predominantly in the fields of differential equations and algebraic logic. He continued his involvement in social causes and maintained connections with Lincoln. In 1864, Boole died due to fever-induced pleural effusion after developing pneumonia.

Boole published around 50 articles and several separate publications in his lifetime. Some of his key works include a paper on early invariant theory and "The Mathematical Analysis of Logic", which introduced symbolic logic. Boole also wrote two systematic treatises: "Treatise on Differential Equations" and "Treatise on the Calculus of Finite Differences". He contributed to the theory of linear differential equations and the study of the sum of residues of a rational function. In 1847, Boole developed Boolean algebra, a fundamental concept in binary logic, which laid the groundwork for the algebra of logic tradition and forms the foundation of digital circuit design and modern computer science. Boole also attempted to discover a general method in probabilities, focusing on determining the consequent probability of events logically connected to given probabilities. He is best known as the author of The Laws of Thought (1854), which contains Boolean algebra. Boolean logic, essential to computer programming, is credited with helping to lay the foundations for the Information Age.

Boole's work was expanded upon by various scholars, such as Charles Sanders Peirce and William Stanley Jevons. Boole's ideas later gained practical applications when Claude Shannon and Victor Shestakov employed Boolean algebra to optimize the design of electromechanical relay systems, leading to the development of modern electronic digital computers. His contributions to mathematics earned him various honours, including the Royal Society's first gold prize for mathematics, the Keith Medal, and honorary degrees from the Universities of Dublin and Oxford. University College Cork celebrated the 200th anniversary of Boole's birth in 2015, highlighting his significant impact on the digital age.

== Early life ==
Boole's House and School in Lincoln

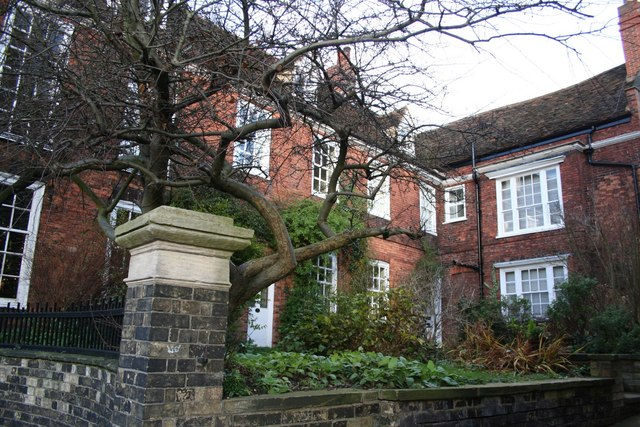
House and School at 3 Pottergate

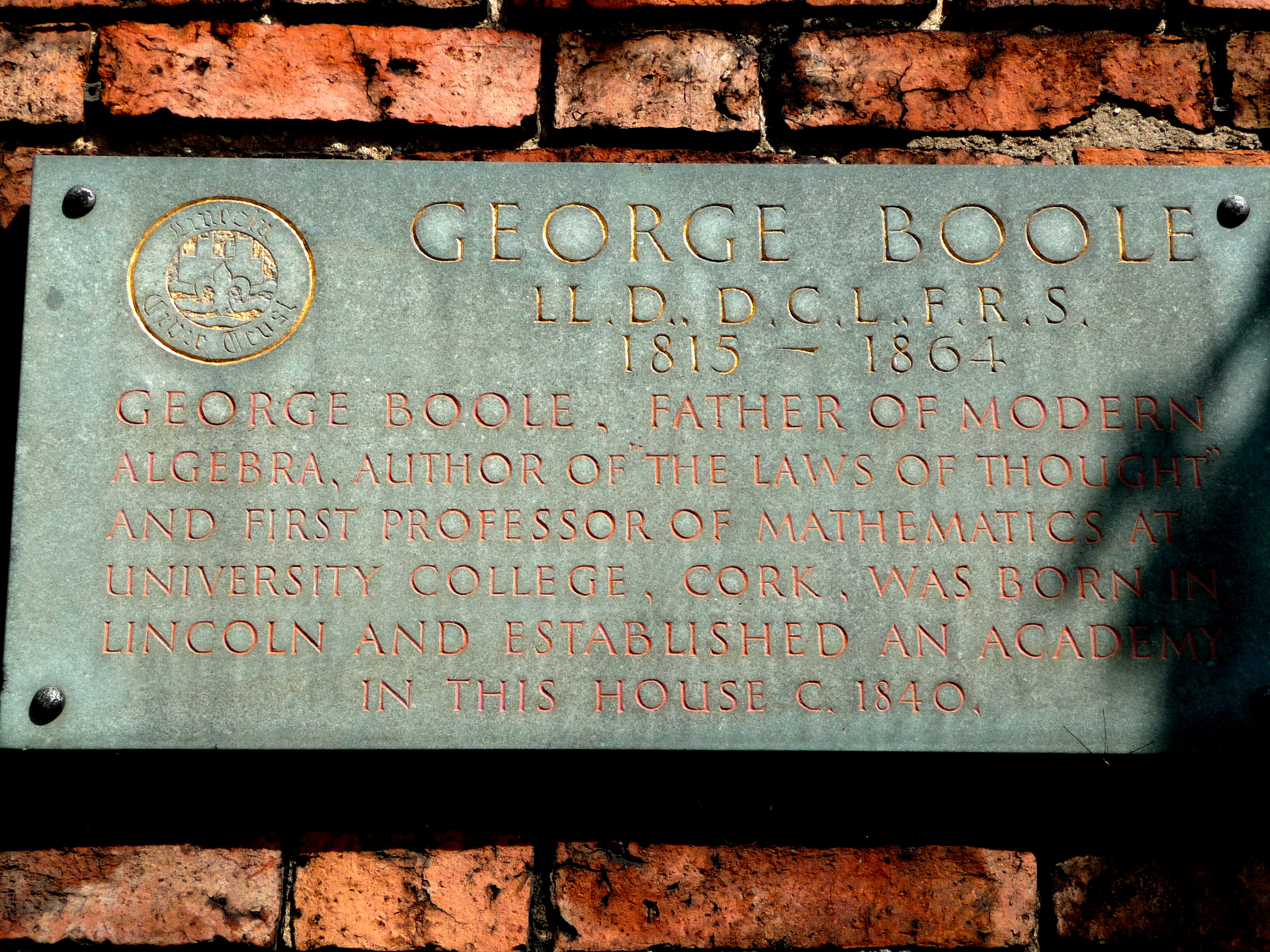
Plaque from the house

Boole was born in 1815 in Lincoln, Lincolnshire, England, the son of John Boole Snr (1779–1848), a shoemaker and Mary Ann Joyce. He had a primary school education, and received lessons from his father, but due to a serious decline in business, he had little further formal and academic teaching. William Brooke, a bookseller in Lincoln, may have helped him with Latin, which he may also have learned at the school of Thomas Bainbridge. He was self-taught in modern languages. In fact, when a local newspaper printed his translation of a Latin poem, a scholar accused him of plagiarism under the pretence that he was not capable of such achievements. At age 16, Boole became the breadwinner for his parents and three younger siblings, taking up a junior teaching position in Doncaster at Heigham's School. He taught briefly in Liverpool.

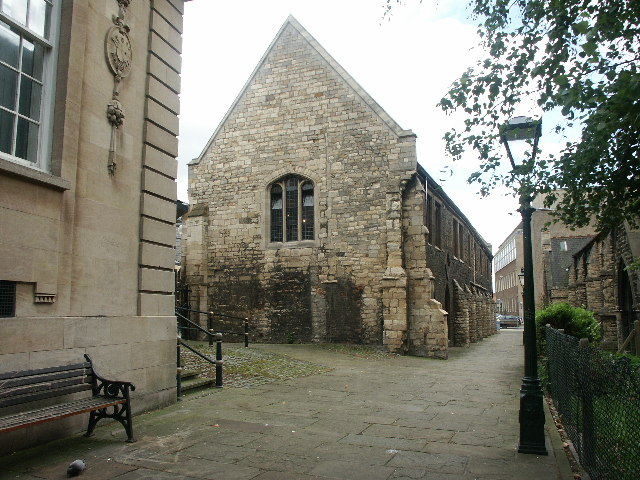
Mechanics' Institute in the former Franciscan friary of Greyfriars in Lincoln.

Boole participated in the Lincoln Mechanics' Institute, in the Greyfriars, Lincoln, which was founded in 1833. Edward Bromhead, who knew John Boole through the institution, helped George Boole with mathematics books and he was given the calculus text of Sylvestre François Lacroix by the Rev. George Stevens Dickson of St Swithin's, Lincoln. Without a teacher, it took him many years to master calculus.

At age 19, Boole successfully established his own school in Lincoln: Free School Lane. Four years later, he took over Hall's Academy in Waddington, outside Lincoln, following the death of Robert Hall. In 1840, he moved back to Lincoln, where he ran a boarding school. Boole immediately became involved in the Lincoln Topographical Society, serving as a member of the committee, and presenting a paper entitled "On the origin, progress, and tendencies of polytheism, especially amongst the ancient Egyptians and Persians, and in modern India".

Boole became a prominent local figure, an admirer of John Kaye, the bishop. He took part in the local campaign for early closing. With Edmund Larken and others he set up a building society in 1847. He associated also with the Chartist Thomas Cooper, whose wife was a relation.

From 1838 onwards, Boole was making contacts with sympathetic British academic mathematicians and reading more widely. He studied algebra in the form of symbolic methods, as far as these were understood at the time, and began to publish research papers.

== Professorship ==
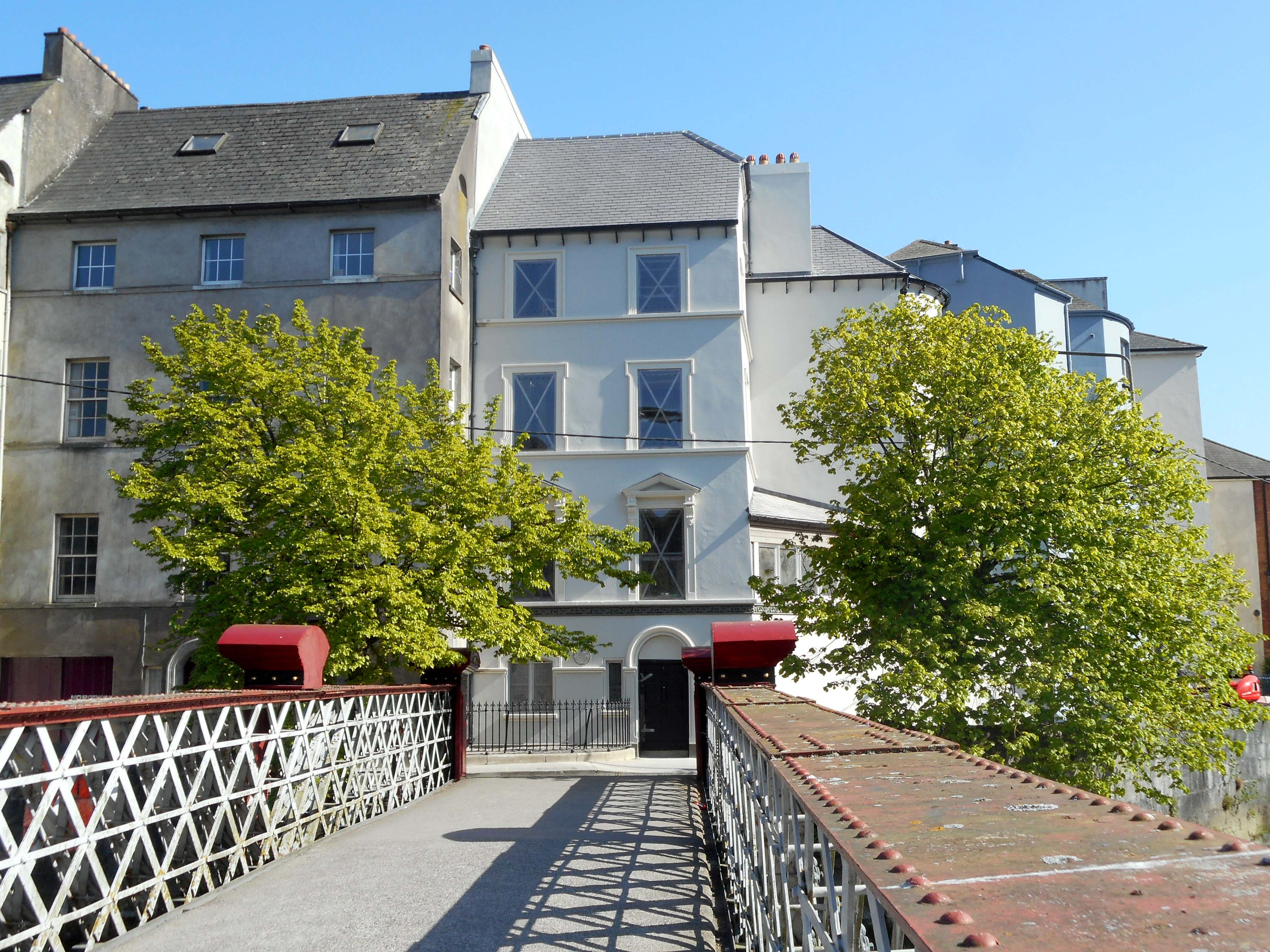
Boole's former home at 5 Grenville Place, Cork, following restoration by University College Cork

Boole's status as a mathematician was recognised by his appointment in 1849 as the first professor of mathematics at Queen's College, Cork (now University College Cork (UCC)) in Ireland. He met his future wife, Mary Everest, there in 1850 while she was visiting her uncle John Ryall who was professor of Greek. They married in 1855. He maintained his ties with Lincoln, working there with E. R. Larken in a campaign to reduce prostitution.

In 1861, Boole was involved in a Judgement in the Court of Queen's Bench in Ireland against one John Hewitt Wheatley of Craig House, Sligo for the sum of £400, whereby Wheatley's estate and interest in lands of Maghan/Mahon, County Cork became vested in Boole.

In March 1863, Boole leased Litchfield Cottage, Cork, the house in which he would live with his wife Mary until his death in December of the following year. The premises was described in the deeds as "all that and those the dwelling house called Litchfield Cottage with the premises and appurtenances thereunto belonging and the Garden and Walled in field to the rere thereof". Boole's will bequeathed all his 'estate term and interest' in the lease of Litchfield Cottage unto his wife. In August 1865, some 8 months after his death, Mary (by then living at 68 Harley Street, London) passed the house on to Francis Heard of Ballintemple, Cork, Esquire, a captain in her Majesty's 87th Regiment of South Cork.

In 1844, Boole's paper "On a General Method in Analysis" won the first gold prize for mathematics awarded by the Royal Society. He was awarded the Keith Medal by the Royal Society of Edinburgh in 1855 and was elected a Fellow of the Royal Society (FRS) in 1857. He received honorary degrees of LL.D. from the University of Dublin and the University of Oxford.

== Personal life ==
In 1855, Boole married Mary Everest (niece of George Everest), who later wrote several educational works on her husband's principles.

=== Children ===
The Booles had five daughters:

- Mary Ellen (1856–1908) who married the mathematician and author Charles Howard Hinton and had four children. After the sudden death of her husband in April 1907, Mary Ellen committed suicide in Washington, D.C., in May 1908.
  - George Hinton (1882–1943), mining engineer and botanist
    - H. E. Hinton (1912–1977), entomologist
      - Geoffrey Hinton (born 1947), cognitive psychologist and computer scientist, Nobel prize for physics 2024, noted for work on artificial neural networks.
  - Eric Hinton (born 1884)
  - William Hinton (1886–1909)
  - Sebastian Hinton (1887–1923), lawyer, inventor of the jungle gym
    - Jean Hinton (married name Rosner) (1917–2002), a peace activist.
    - William H. Hinton (1919–2004) visited China in the 1930s and 40s and wrote an influential account of the Communist land reform.
    - Joan Hinton (1921–2010) worked for the Manhattan Project and lived in China from 1948 until her death on 8 June 2010; she was married to Sid Engst.
- Margaret (1858–1935), married Edward Ingram Taylor, an artist.
  - Their elder son Geoffrey Ingram Taylor became a mathematician and a Fellow of the Royal Society.
  - Their younger son Julian Taylor was a professor of surgery.
- Alicia (1860–1940), who made important contributions to four-dimensional geometry.
  - Her son Leonard Stott, a medical doctor and tuberculosis pioneer, invented a portable X-ray machine, a pneumothorax apparatus, and system of navigation based on spherical coordinates.
- Lucy Everest (1862–1904), who was the first female professor of chemistry in England.
- Ethel Lilian (1864–1960), who married the Polish scientist and revolutionary Wilfrid Michael Voynich and was the author of the novel The Gadfly.

=== Religious views ===
Boole's views were given in four published addresses: The Genius of Sir Isaac Newton; The Right Use of Leisure; The Claims of Science; and The Social Aspect of Intellectual Culture. The first of these was from 1835 when Charles Anderson-Pelham, 1st Earl of Yarborough gave a bust of Newton to the Mechanics' Institute in Lincoln. The second justified and celebrated in 1847 the outcome of the successful campaign for early closing in Lincoln, headed by Alexander Leslie-Melville, of Branston Hall. The Claims of Science was given in 1851 at Queen's College, Cork. The Social Aspect of Intellectual Culture was also given in Cork, in 1855 to the Cuvierian Society.

Though his biographer Des MacHale describes Boole as an "agnostic deist", Boole read a wide variety of Christian theology. Combining his interests in mathematics and theology, he compared the Christian trinity of Father, Son, and Holy Ghost with the three dimensions of space, and was attracted to the Hebrew conception of God as an absolute unity. Boole considered converting to Judaism but in the end was said to have chosen Unitarianism.^{[reference?]} Boole came to speak against what he saw as "prideful" scepticism, and instead favoured the belief in a "Supreme Intelligent Cause". He also declared "I firmly believe, for the accomplishment of a purpose of the Divine Mind." In addition, he stated "To infer the existence of an intelligent cause from the teeming evidence of surrounding design, to rise to the conception of a moral Governor of the World, from the study of the constitution and the moral provisions of our own nature;--these, though but the feeble steps of an understanding limited in its faculties and its materials of knowledge, are of more avail than the ambitious attempt to arrive at a certainty unattainable on the ground of natural religion. And as these were the most ancient, so are they still the most solid foundations, Revelation being set apart, of the belief that the course of this world is not abandoned to chance and inexorable fate."

Two influences on Boole were later claimed by his wife, Mary Everest Boole: a universal mysticism tempered by Jewish thought, and Indian logic. Mary Boole stated that an adolescent mystical experience provided for his life's work:

My husband told me that when he was a lad of seventeen a thought struck him suddenly, which became the foundation of all his future discoveries. It was a flash of psychological insight into the conditions under which a mind most readily accumulates knowledge ... For a few years he supposed himself to be convinced of the truth of "the Bible" as a whole, and even intended to take orders as a clergyman of the English Church. But by the help of a learned Jew in Lincoln he found out the true nature of the discovery which had dawned on him. This was that man's mind works by means of some mechanism which "functions normally towards Monism."

In Ch. 13 of Laws of Thought Boole used examples of propositions from Baruch Spinoza and Samuel Clarke. The work contains some remarks on the relationship of logic to religion, but they are slight and cryptic. Boole was apparently disconcerted at the book's reception just as a mathematical toolset:

George afterwards learned, to his great joy, that the same conception of the basis of Logic was held by Leibniz, the contemporary of Newton. De Morgan, of course, understood the formula in its true sense; he was Boole's collaborator all along. Herbert Spencer, Jowett, and Robert Leslie Ellis understood, I feel sure; and a few others, but nearly all the logicians and mathematicians ignored [953] the statement that the book was meant to throw light on the nature of the human mind; and treated the formula entirely as a wonderful new method of reducing to logical order masses of evidence about external fact.

Mary Boole claimed that there was profound influence – via her uncle George Everest – of Indian thought in general and Indian logic, in particular, on George Boole, as well as on Augustus De Morgan and Charles Babbage:

Think what must have been the effect of the intense Hinduizing of three such men as Babbage, De Morgan, and George Boole on the mathematical atmosphere of 1830–65. What share had it in generating the Vector Analysis and the mathematics by which investigations in physical science are now conducted?

Boole maintained that:

No general method for the solution of questions in the theory of probabilities can be established which does not explicitly recognise, not only the special numerical bases of the science, but also those universal laws of thought which are the basis of all reasoning, and which, whatever they may be as to their essence, are at least mathematical as to their form.

== Death ==
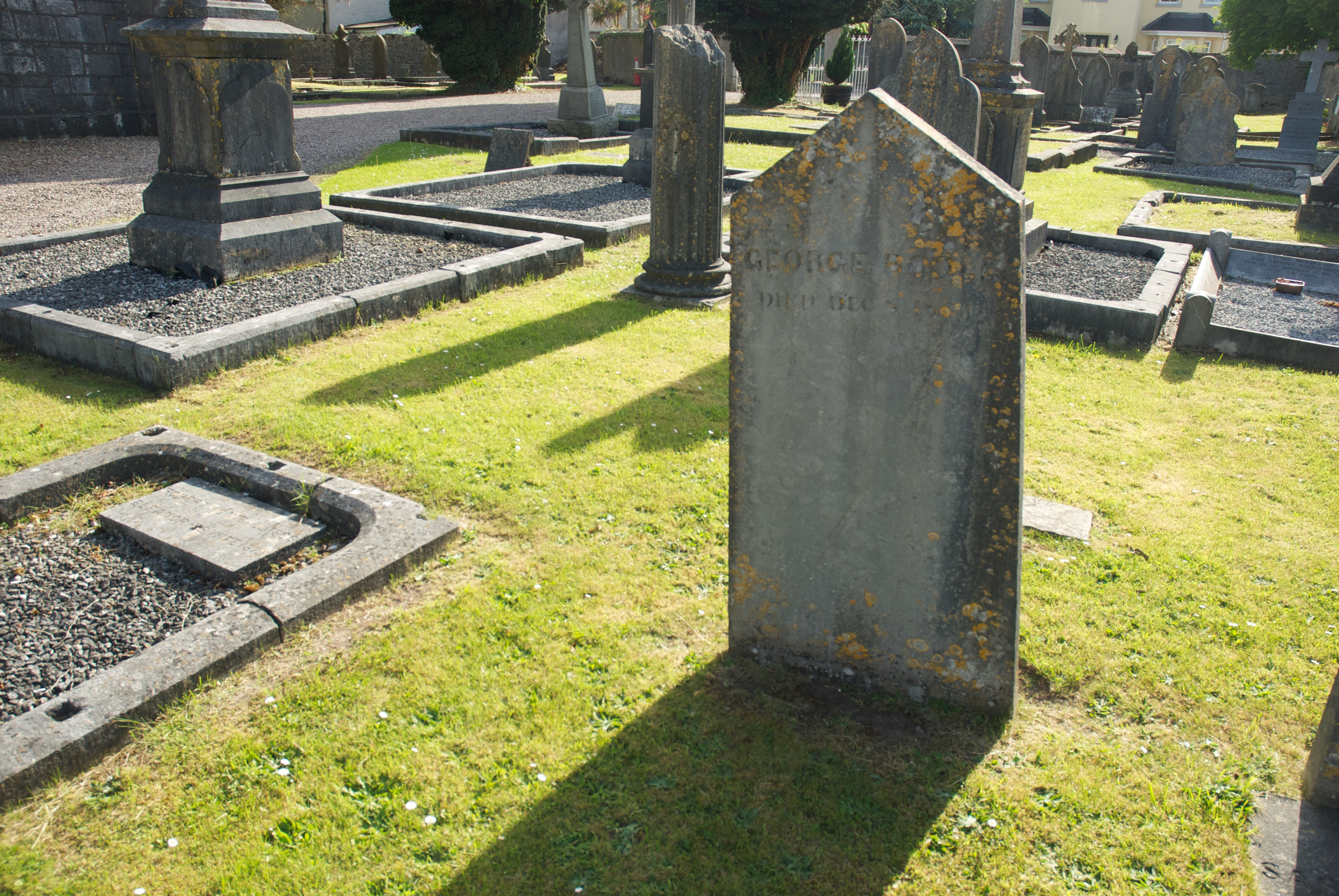
Boole's gravestone in Blackrock, Cork, Ireland

In late November 1864, Boole walked, in heavy rain, from his home at Lichfield Cottage in Ballintemple to the university, a distance of three miles, and lectured wearing his wet clothes. He soon became ill, developing pneumonia. As his wife believed that remedies should resemble their cause, she wrapped him in wet blankets – the wet having brought on his illness. Boole's condition worsened and on 8 December 1864, he died of fever-induced pleural effusion.

He was buried in the Church of Ireland cemetery of St Michael's, Church Road, Blackrock (a suburb of Cork). There is a commemorative plaque inside the adjoining church.

== Legacy ==
Memorials to George Boole

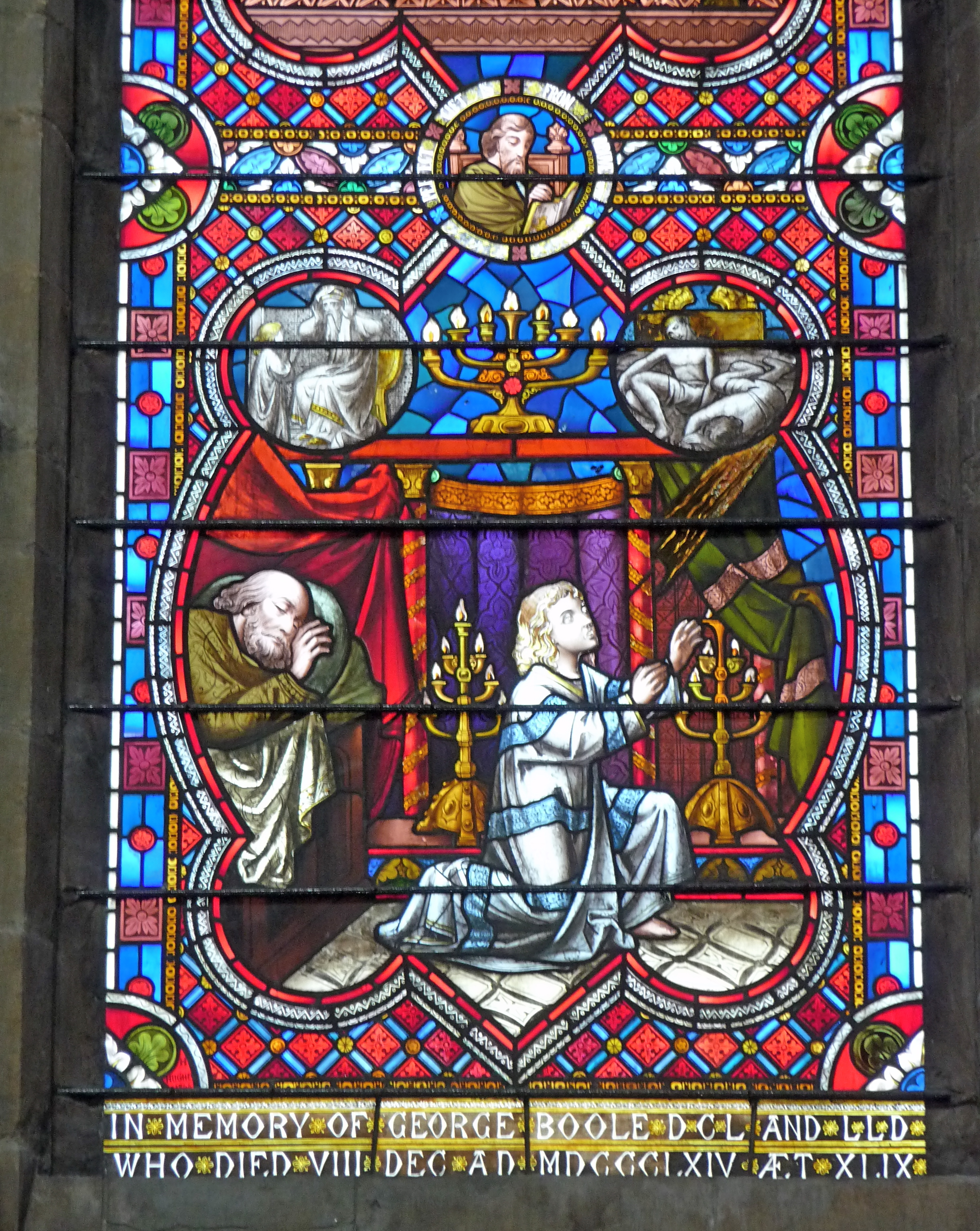
Stained glass window in Lincoln Cathedral dedicated to Boole with his favourite Bible passage from the First Book of Samuel (3:1–10), which was suggested by his widow.

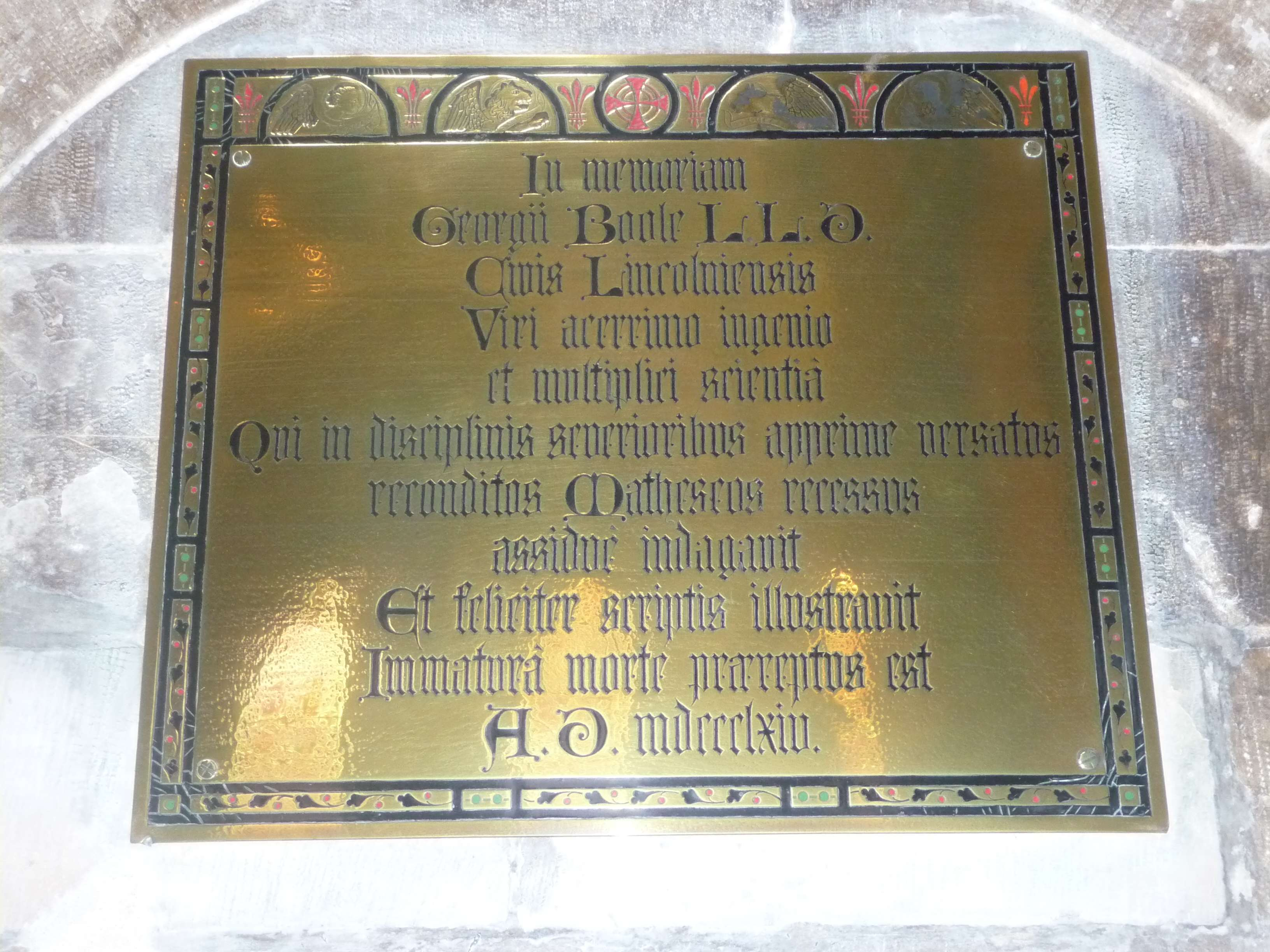
Plaque beneath window in Lincoln Cathedral

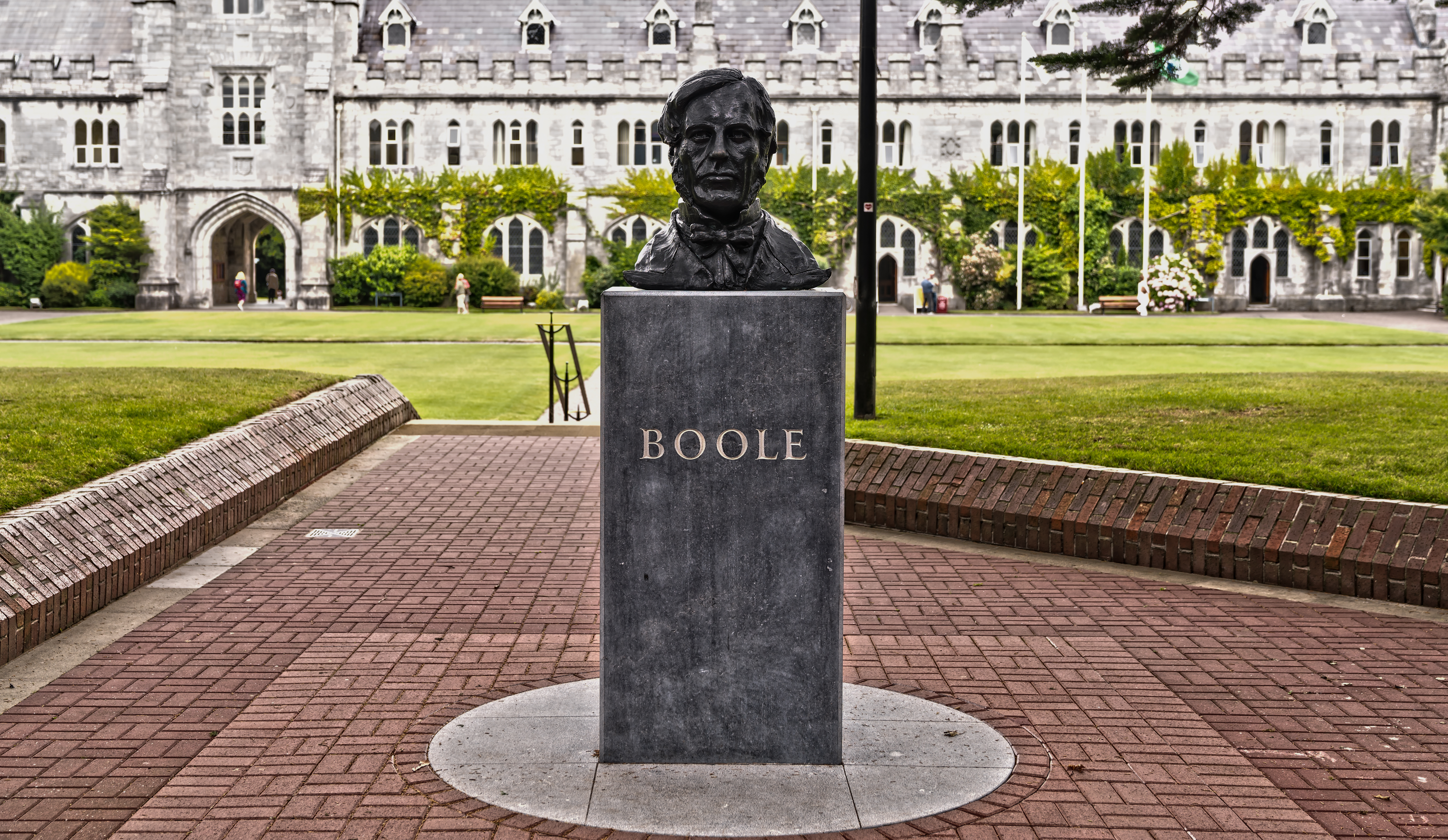
Bust of Boole at University College Cork

Boole is the namesake of the branch of algebra known as Boolean algebra, as well as the namesake of the lunar crater Boole. The keyword Bool represents a Boolean data type in many programming languages, though Pascal and Java, among others, both use the full name Boolean. The library, underground lecture theatre complex and the Boole Centre for Research in Informatics at University College Cork are named in his honour. A road called Boole Heights in Bracknell, Berkshire is named after him.

Boole's work was extended and refined by a number of writers, beginning with William Stanley Jevons, who also authored the article about Boole in the Encyclopædia Britannica. Augustus De Morgan had worked on the logic of relations, and Charles Sanders Peirce integrated his work with Boole's during the 1870s. Other significant figures were Platon Sergeevich Poretskii, and William Ernest Johnson. The conception of a Boolean algebra structure on equivalent statements of a propositional calculus is credited to Hugh MacColl (1877), in work surveyed 15 years later by Johnson. Surveys of these developments were published by Ernst Schröder, Louis Couturat, and Clarence Irving Lewis.

=== 20th-century applications ===
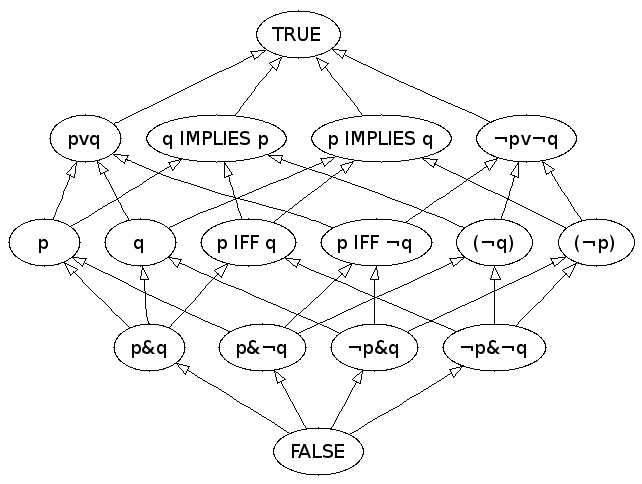
In modern notation, the free Boolean algebra on basic propositions p and q arranged in a Hasse diagram. The Boolean combinations make up 16 different propositions, and the lines show which are logically related.

In 1921, the economist John Maynard Keynes published a book on probability theory, A Treatise of Probability. Keynes believed that Boole had made a fundamental error in his definition of independence which vitiated much of his analysis. In his book The Last Challenge Problem, David Miller provides a general method in accord with Boole's system and attempts to solve the problems recognised earlier by Keynes and others. Theodore Hailperin showed much earlier that Boole had used the correct mathematical definition of independence in his worked out problems.

Boole's work and that of later logicians initially appeared to have no engineering uses. Claude Shannon attended a philosophy class at the University of Michigan which introduced him to Boole's studies. Shannon recognised that Boole's work could form the basis of mechanisms and processes in the real world and that it was therefore highly relevant. In 1937 Shannon went on to write a master's thesis, at the Massachusetts Institute of Technology, in which he showed how Boolean algebra could optimise the design of systems of electromechanical relays then used in telephone routing switches. He also proved that circuits with relays could solve Boolean algebra problems. Employing the properties of electrical switches to process logic is the basic concept that underlies all modern electronic digital computers. Victor Shestakov at Moscow State University (1907–1987) proposed a theory of electric switches based on Boolean logic even earlier than Claude Shannon in 1935 on the testimony of Soviet logicians and mathematicians Sofya Yanovskaya, Gaaze-Rapoport, Roland Dobrushin, Lupanov, Medvedev and Uspensky. But the first publication of Shestakov's result took place only in 1941 (in Russian). Hence, Boolean algebra became the foundation of practical digital circuit design; and Boole, via Shannon and Shestakov, provided the theoretical grounding for the Information Age.

=== Bicentennial anniversary ===
Boole's legacy surrounds us everywhere, in the computers, information storage and retrieval, electronic circuits and controls that support life, learning and communications in the 21st century. His pivotal advances in mathematics, logic and probability provided the essential groundwork for modern mathematics, microelectronic engineering and computer science.

— University College Cork

The year 2015 was the 200th anniversary of Boole's birth. To mark the bicentenary year, University College Cork joined admirers of Boole around the world to celebrate his life and legacy.

UCC's George Boole 200 project, featured events, student outreach activities and academic conferences on Boole's legacy in the digital age, including a new edition of Desmond MacHale's 1985 biography The Life and Work of George Boole: A Prelude to the Digital Age, 2014.

The search engine Google marked the 200th anniversary of his birth on 2 November 2015 with an algebraic reimaging of its Google Doodle.

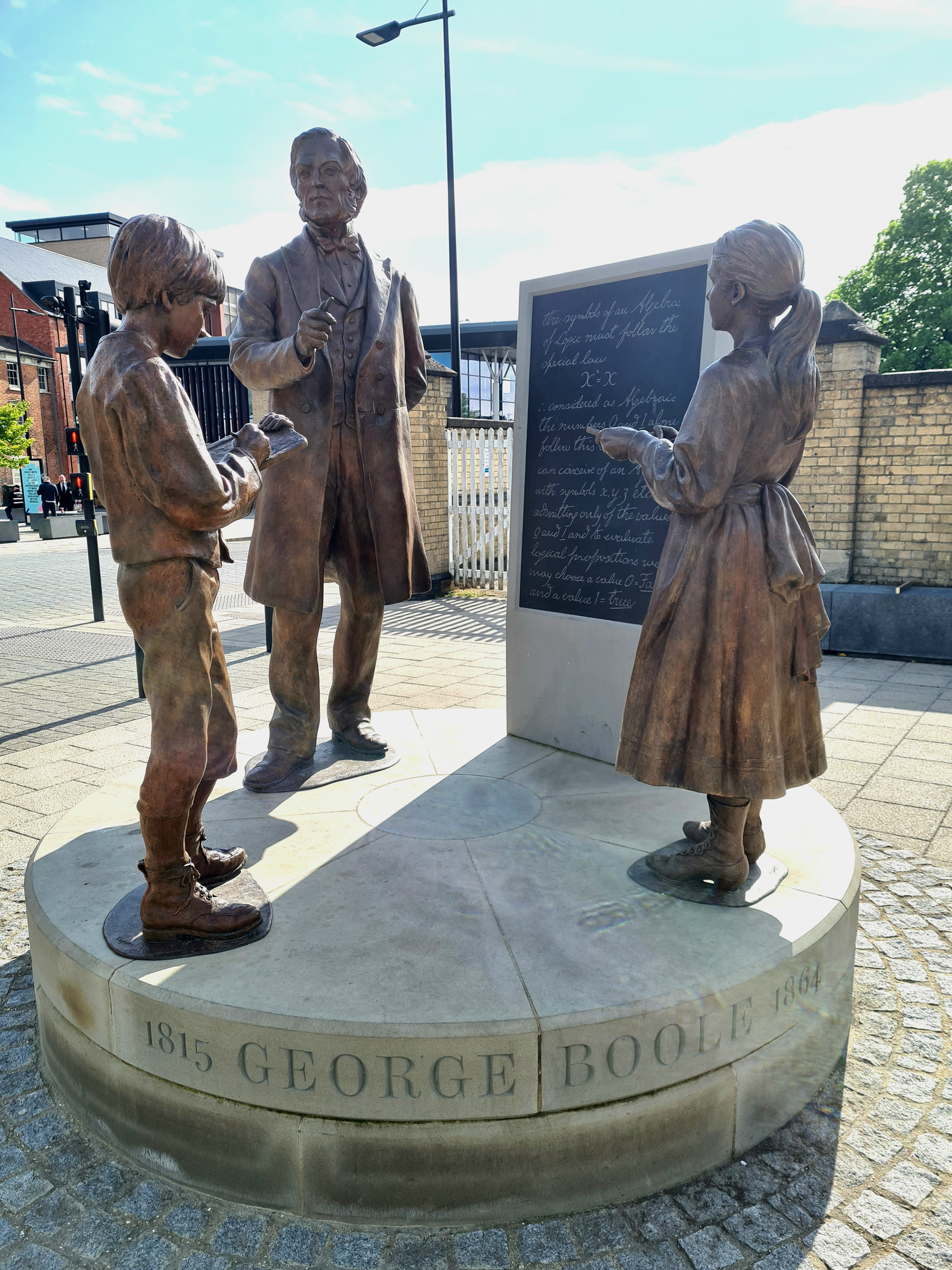
Bronze statue of Boole located at Lincoln Central Train Station. The design, by sculptor Antony Dufort, was funded in part by the Heslam Trust.

In September 2022, a statue of George Boole in his role as a teacher was unveiled at Lincoln Central Train Station, in Boole's home town of Lincoln.

== Mathematical works ==
Boole's first published paper was "Researches in the theory of analytical transformations, with a special application to the reduction of the general equation of the second order", printed in the Cambridge Mathematical Journal in February 1840 (Volume 2, No. 8, pp. 64–73), and it led to his friendship with Duncan Farquharson Gregory, the editor of the journal. His works are in about 50 articles and a few separate publications.

In 1841, Boole published an influential paper on early invariant theory. He received a medal from the Royal Society for his memoir of 1844, "On a General Method in Analysis". It was a contribution to the theory of linear differential equations, moving from the case of constant coefficients on which he had already published, to variable coefficients. The innovation in operational methods is to admit that operations may not commute. In 1847, Boole published The Mathematical Analysis of Logic, the first of his works on symbolic logic.

=== Differential equations ===
Boole completed two systematic treatises on mathematical subjects during his lifetime. The Treatise on Differential Equations appeared in 1859, and was followed, the next year, by a Treatise on the Calculus of Finite Differences, a sequel to the former work. Shortly after his death, Todhunter republished Boole's treatise with some of Boole's revisions, along with a supplement that was originally intended to be merged in the making of the second edition.

=== Analysis ===
In 1857, Boole published the treatise "On the Comparison of Transcendent, with Certain Applications to the Theory of Definite Integrals", in which he studied the sum of residues of a rational function. Among other results, he proved what is now called Boole's identity:

$$\mathrm{mes} \left\{ x \in \mathbb{R} \, \mid \, \Re \frac{1}{\pi} \sum \frac{a_k}{x - b_k} \geq t \right\} = \frac{\sum a_k}{\pi t}$$

for any real numbers a_{k} > 0, b_{k}, and t > 0. Generalisations of this identity play an important role in the theory of the Hilbert transform.

=== Binary logic ===
In 1847, Boole published the pamphlet Mathematical Analysis of Logic. He later regarded it as a flawed exposition of his logical system and wanted An Investigation of the Laws of Thought on Which are Founded the Mathematical Theories of Logic and Probabilities to be seen as the mature statement of his views. Contrary to widespread belief, Boole never intended to criticise or disagree with the main principles of Aristotle's logic. Rather, he intended to systematise it, to provide it with a foundation, and to extend its range of applicability. Boole's initial involvement in logic was prompted by a current debate on quantification, between Sir William Hamilton who supported the theory of "quantification of the predicate", and Boole's supporter Augustus De Morgan who advanced a version of De Morgan duality, as it is now called. Boole's approach was ultimately much further reaching than either sides' in the controversy. It founded what was first known as the "algebra of logic" tradition.

Among his many innovations is his principle of wholistic reference, which was later, and probably independently, adopted by Gottlob Frege and by logicians who subscribe to standard first-order logic. A 2003 article provides a systematic comparison and critical evaluation of Aristotelian logic and Boolean logic; it also reveals the centrality of holistic reference in Boole's philosophy of logic.

==== 1854 definition of the universe of discourse ====
In every discourse, whether of the mind conversing with its own thoughts, or of the individual in his intercourse with others, there is an assumed or expressed limit within which the subjects of its operation are confined. The most unfettered discourse is that in which the words we use are understood in the widest possible application, and for them, the limits of discourse are co-extensive with those of the universe itself. But more usually we confine ourselves to a less spacious field. Sometimes, in discoursing of men we imply (without expressing the limitation) that it is of men only under certain circumstances and conditions that we speak, as of civilised men, or of men in the vigour of life, or of men under some other condition or relation. Now, whatever may be the extent of the field within which all the objects of our discourse are found, that field may properly be termed the universe of discourse. Furthermore, this universe of discourse is in the strictest sense the ultimate subject of the discourse.

==== Treatment of addition in logic ====
Boole conceived of "elective symbols" of his kind as an algebraic structure. But this general concept was not available to him: he did not have the segregation standard in abstract algebra of postulated (axiomatic) properties of operations, and deduced properties. His work was a beginning to the algebra of sets, again not a concept available to Boole as a familiar model. His pioneering efforts encountered specific difficulties, and the treatment of addition was an obvious difficulty in the early days.

Boole replaced the operation of multiplication by the word "and" and addition by the word "or". But in Boole's original system, + was a partial operation: in the language of set theory it would correspond only to the union of disjoint subsets. Later authors changed the interpretation, commonly reading it as exclusive or, or in set theory terms symmetric difference; this step means that addition is always defined.

In fact, there is the other possibility generalizing Boole's original partial operation, that + should be read as non-exclusive or. Handling this ambiguity was an early problem of the theory, reflecting the modern use of both Boolean rings and Boolean algebras (which are simply different aspects of one type of structure). Boole and Jevons struggled over just this issue in 1863, in the form of the correct evaluation of x + x. Jevons argued for the result x, which is correct for + as disjunction. Boole kept the result as something undefined. He argued against the result 0, which is correct for exclusive or, because he saw the equation x + x = 0 as implying x = 0, a false analogy with ordinary algebra.

=== Probability theory ===
The second part of the Laws of Thought contained a corresponding attempt to discover a general method in probabilities. Here the goal was algorithmic: from the given probabilities of any system of events, to determine the consequent probability of any other event logically connected with those events.

== See also ==
=== Concepts ===
- Boolean algebra, a logical calculus of truth values or set membership
- Boolean algebra (structure), a set with operations resembling logical ones
- Boolean circuit, a mathematical model for digital logical circuits.
- Boolean data type is a data type, having two values (usually denoted true and false)
- Boolean expression, an expression in a programming language that produces a Boolean value when evaluated
- Boolean function, a function that determines Boolean values or operators
- Boolean model (probability theory), a model in stochastic geometry
- Boolean network, a certain network consisting of a set of Boolean variables whose state is determined by other variables in the network
- Boolean processor, a 1-bit variables computing unit
- Boolean ring, a ring consisting of idempotent elements
- Boolean satisfiability problem
- Boole's syllogistic is a logic invented by 19th-century British mathematician George Boole, which attempts to incorporate the "empty set".
- Laws of thought
- Principle of wholistic reference

=== Other ===
- List of Boolean algebra topics
- List of pioneers in computer science
