= Law of thought =

Logical principles

In logic and philosophy, "laws of thought" is a dated expression referring to three logical principles: the law of identity (LOI), the law of non-contradiction (LNC), and the law of excluded middle (LEM).

The expression "laws of thought" gained prominence through its use by idealist and conceptualist logicians such as George Boole (1815–1864). Boole named his second logic book An Investigation of the Laws of Thought on Which are Founded the Mathematical Theories of Logic and Probabilities (1854).

Among contemporary logicians, the expression "laws of thought" is widely regarded as obsolete. The reasons for this can be summarized as follows:

1. The laws have no foundational status. They are tautologies or logical truths of classical logic, but are not typically taken to be axioms, but rather theorems. No viable system of logic can be constructed in which the "three laws" would be the only axioms.
2. Following the rejection of psychologism in the 19th century by some authors (e.g., Frege, Husserl) psychology and logic are considered to be separate disciplines. The study of how people think and reason belongs to cognitive psychology. Logic is concerned with the relationships of logical consequence between propositions or sentences.
3. The laws are not universally accepted. There are non-classical logics that reject one or more of the three principles.

While there are some contemporary philosophers of logic who consider that logical laws can be regarded as constitutive of rational thought, they too reject the old view of logic as the "three laws".

== Overview ==
The law of identity can be written symbolically as a = a. The law of non-contradiction can be written ¬(p ∧ ¬p). and the law of excluded middle: p ∨ ¬p. The a refers to singular terms; while the p refers to propositions, or whole sentences. In propositional logic, there is no law of identity.

== History ==
=== Leibniz ===
Gottfried Wilhelm Leibniz claimed that the law of identity, which he expresses as "Everything is what it is", is the first primitive truth of reason which is affirmative, and the law of noncontradiction is the first negative truth (Nouv. Ess. IV, 2, § i), arguing that "the statement that a thing is what it is, is prior to the statement that it is not another thing" (Nouv. Ess. IV, 7, § 9). Wilhelm Wundt credits Gottfried Leibniz with the symbolic formulation, "A is A."

Leibniz formulated three additional principles, either or both of which sometimes were counted as a "law of thought"

- principle of sufficient reason
- indiscernability of identicals

- identity of indiscernibles

The latter two constitute Leibniz's Law, which, unlike the law of identity, explains identity.

=== Four Laws ===
Several authors have added the principle of sufficient reason as the fourth "law of thought". William Hamilton and Arthur Schopenhauer were among them. Schopenhauer later believed the law of excluded middle and the principle of sufficient reason were the two laws of thought.

=== Boole ===
George Boole's 1854 treatise on logic, An Investigation on the Laws of Thought is the most famous logical work which thought logic was about "laws of the mind."

=== Modern logic ===
==== Frege ====
Gottlob Frege's attack on psychologism proved highly influential, especially after convincing Husserl. Before Frege, Bolzano also seemed to be against psychologism in logic.

==== Russell ====
Russell notes that "for no very good reason, three of these principles have been singled out by tradition under the name of 'Laws of Thought'. (Note: "These three laws are samples of self-evident logical principles, but are not really more fundamental or more self-evident than various other similar principles: for instance, the one we considered just now, which states that what follows from a true premiss is true." (Bertrand Russell, The Problems of Philosophy, Chapter VII)) And these he lists as follows:

1. The law of identity: "Whatever is, is."
2. The law of contradiction: "Nothing can both be and not be."
3. The law of excluded middle: "Everything must either be or not be."

Russell and Whitehead's Principia Mathematica derives over a hundred different formula as theorems, among which are the Law of Excluded Middle ❋1.71, and the Law of Non-Contradiction ❋3.24.

== Contemporary developments ==
In modern so called classical logic propositions and predicate expressions are two-valued, with either the truth value "truth" or "falsity" but not both. The law of excluded middle therefore says each proposition has at least one truth value. There are no truth gaps. The law of non contradiction says no proposition has more than one truth value. There are no truth gluts.

The law of non-contradiction and the law of excluded middle create a dichotomy in a so-called logical space, the points in which are all the consistent combinations of propositions. Each combination would contain exactly one member of each pair of contradictory propositions, so the space would have two parts which are mutually exclusive and jointly exhaustive. The law of non-contradiction is merely an expression of the mutually exclusive aspect of that dichotomy, and the law of excluded middle is an expression of its jointly exhaustive aspect.

There are also many valued logics, with gaps or gluts, or both. Intuitionistic logic denies the law of excluded middle. Paraconsistent logic tolerates contradiction.

=== Intuitionistic logic ===
'Intuitionistic logic', sometimes more generally called constructive logic, refers to systems of symbolic logic that differ from the systems used for classical logic by more closely mirroring the notion of constructive proof. In particular, systems of intuitionistic logic do not assume the law of the excluded middle and double negation elimination.

=== Paraconsistent logic ===
'Paraconsistent logic' refers to so-called contradiction-tolerant logical systems in which a contradiction does not necessarily result in trivialism. In other words, the principle of explosion is not valid in such logics.

Some (namely the dialetheists) argue that the law of non-contradiction is false. They are motivated by certain paradoxes which seem to imply a limit of the law of non-contradiction, such as the liar paradox. In order to avoid a trivial logical system and still allow certain contradictions to be true, dialetheists will employ a paraconsistent logic of some kind.

== Logical laws as constitutive of rational thought ==
Among contemporary logicians, the distinction between psychology and logic is widely accepted. However, there are a few philosophers of logic who consider that logical laws can be regarded as constitutive of rational thought.

For example, Paul Boghossian argues that to possess a concept is, in part, a disposition to draw inferences in accordance with some basic rules. He claims that some inferential principles are constitutive of contentful thought and are part of what it means to have beliefs at all.

Robert Hanna contends that logic arises from an innate protological cognitive capacity that is necessarily shared by all rational human animals. This is a 'protologic' that is "structurally distinct from all classical and nonclassical systems, but unifies the many logics through its role in the construction of all logical systems".

Jessica Leech claims that the laws of logic can be considered to be laws of thought, understood as constitutive norms of thought.

However, none of these authors identify basic rules, protologic, or laws of thought with the "three laws".
