= List of fellows of the Royal Society elected in 1857 =

Fellows of the Royal Society elected in 1857.

== Fellows ==
1. Lionel Smith Beale (1828–1906)
2. George Boole (1815–1864)
3. George Bowdler Buckton (1818–1905)
4. Thomas Davidson (1817–1885)
5. George Grote (1794–1871)
6. Rowland Hill (1795–1879)
7. Thomas Penyngton Kirkman (1806–1895)
8. William Marcet (1828–1900)
9. John Marshall (1818–1891)
10. Robert Angus Smith (1817–1884)
11. Andrew Smith (1797–1872)
12. Charles Piazzi Smyth (1819–1900)
13. Henry Clifton Sorby (1826–1908)
14. John Welsh (1824–1859)
15. Joseph Whitworth (1803–1887)
