= Thomas Cooper Memorial Baptist Church =

Church in Lincoln, England

TCM Baptist Church
- Thomas Cooper Memorial Baptist Church
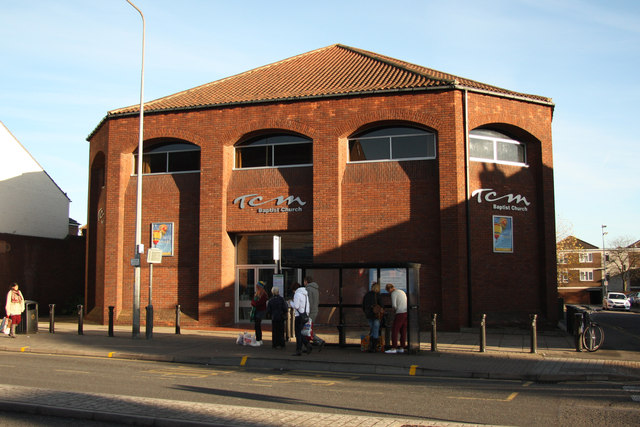
- Thomas Cooper Memorial Baptist Church
- TCM Baptist Church
- 53.2236°N 0.5429°W
- OS grid reference: SK 97363 70617
- Location: High Street, Lincoln, Lincolnshire,
- Country: England
- Denomination: Baptist
- Website: www.tcmlincoln.co.uk

History
- Status: Active

Architecture
- Functional status: Active
- Completed: 1974

The Thomas Cooper Memorial Baptist Church also known as the Thomas Cooper Memorial Church or Chapel, Thomas Cooper Church and TCM Baptist Church, is a Baptist church in the city of Lincoln in Lincolnshire, England. The church is an active church on the High Street of Lincoln and was named in memory of Thomas Cooper.

== History ==
The first Baptist church in Lincoln, known as the General Baptist Church, was built in 1701 in the Cornhill Quarter of the Lincoln city centre near to St Benedict's Church and the River Witham. It was demolished and rebuilt in 1860 on the same site, and again in 1884 - 1886. This building was then demolished in the late 1960s as part of a deal with Marks & Spencer who wished to redevelop the site for their Lincoln branch superstore. As part of the agreement, the church trustees moved to the current site and the current building was built in 1972, designed by architect Frederick Gibberd. The current site was previously occupied by the Hannah Memorial Wesleyan Chapel, named in honour of John Hannah (1792–1867), which had closed in 1962, its congregation moving to Portland Place, the present Central Methodist Church.

The church was named the Thomas Cooper Memorial Mission, and then the Thomas Cooper Memorial Baptist Church, in honour of Thomas Cooper (1805-1892), a Chartist, historian and poet. A history of the church was published in 2015. In the following year the church was subject to a suspected arson attack, but the fire was controlled without major damage.
