= Wholistic reference =

Concept in logic

Wholistic reference is reference to the whole—with respect to the context. In its strongest, unqualified form, the principle of wholistic reference is the proposition that each and every proposition, regardless how limited the referents of its non-logical or content terms, refers to the whole of its universe of discourse. According to this principle every proposition of number theory, even an equational proposition such as 5 + 7 = 12, refers not only to the individual numbers that it happens to mention but to the whole universe of numbers. The relation verb ‘refers’ is being used in its broad sense (loosely “is about”) and not as a synonym for ‘names’ in the sense of “is a name of”.

George Boole (1815–1864) introduced this principle into modern logic: Even though he changed from a monistic fixed-universe framework in his 1840s writings to a pluralistic multiple-universe framework in 1854, he never wavered in his frank avowal of the principle of wholistic reference. Indeed, he took it as an essential accompaniment to his theory of concept formation and proposition formation. For Boole, the essential first step in the process of conceiving of a proposition preliminary to making a judgement of its truth or falsity – or even using it in a deduction, however hypothetically – was to conceive of the universe of discourse. See Boole 1854/2003, xxi, 27, 42, 43. One statement of his principle is in the sentence immediately following his definition of universe of discourse, which is his first use of the expression 'universe of discourse' and probably the first in the history of the English language. See the next section. [which one?]

Similar views, perhaps not similarly motivated, are found in later logicians, including Gottlob Frege (1848–1925). Some recent formulations of standard one-sorted first-order logic seem to be in accord with a form of it, if they do not actually imply the principle itself.
