= Julian Taylor (surgeon) =

British surgeon (1889–1961)

- Born: 26 January 1889; London, England
- Died: 15 April 1961 (aged 72); Midhurst, England
- Education: University College School, London; University College Hospital, London
- Years active: 1911 to 1961
- Relatives: Sir Geoffrey Ingram Taylor OM
- Medical career
- Profession: Surgeon
- Institutions: University College Hospital, London; University of Khartoum, Sudan
- Sub-specialties: neurological surgery

Professor Julian Taylor, C.B.E., M.S., F.R.C.S., Hon.F.R.A.C.S. (26 January 1889 – 15 April 1961) was a specialist in neurological surgery, Senior Surgeon at University College Hospital, a former vice-president of the Royal College of Surgeons and later Professor of Surgery at the University of Khartoum.

Born in St. John's Wood, London, his father was the artist Edward Ingram Taylor and his mother, Margaret Boole, came from a family of mathematicians (his aunt was Alicia Boole Stott and his grandfather was George Boole). His brother was the physicist Sir Geoffrey Ingram Taylor OM. Educated at University College School and University College Hospital, he qualified in 1911, an immediate disciple of Wilfred Trotter, one of the pioneers in neurosurgery, graduated M.B., B.S., with honours in medicine in the following year and took the F.R.C.S. in 1914.
