= Domain of discourse =

Type of abstract object

A symbol for the set of domain of discourse

In the formal sciences, the domain of discourse or universe of discourse (borrowing from the mathematical concept of universe) is the set of entities over which certain variables of interest in some formal treatment may range.

It is also defined as the collection of objects being discussed in a specific discourse. In model-theoretical semantics, a universe of discourse is the set of entities that a model is based on.

The domain of discourse is usually identified in the preliminaries, so that there is no need in the further treatment to specify each time the range of the relevant variables. Many logicians distinguish, sometimes only tacitly, between the domain of a science and the universe of discourse of a formalization of the science.

In mathematics, the concept is distinguished from a universe, which is some set internal to a set theory, whereas a domain of discourse is metamathematical, allowing one to speak of the universe of sets or collection of all classes in a formal way.

== Etymology ==
In 1847 Augustus De Morgan used U to indicate "everything in the universe spoken of".

The phrase universe of discourse was used by George Boole in Laws of Thought (1854):

In every discourse, whether of the mind conversing with its own thoughts, or of the individual in his folley with others, there is an assumed or expressed limit within which the subjects of its operation are confined. The most unfettered discourse is that in which the words we use are understood in the widest possible application, and for them the limits of discourse are co-extensive with those of the universe itself. But more usually we confine ourselves to a less spacious field. Sometimes, in discoursing of men we imply (without expressing the limitation) that it is of men only under certain circumstances and conditions that we speak, as of civilized men, or of men in the vigour of life, or of men under some other condition or relation. Now, whatever may be the extent of the field within which all the objects of our discourse are found, that field may properly be termed the universe of discourse. Furthermore, this universe of discourse is in the strictest sense the ultimate subject of the discourse.

— George Boole, The Laws of Thought. 1854/2003. page 42.

The concept, probably discovered independently by Boole in 1847, played a crucial role in his philosophy of logic especially in his principle of wholistic reference.

Alfred North Whitehead cited Augustus De Morgan as identifying "that limited class of things which is the special subject of discourse on any particular occasion. Such a class was called by De Morgan, the Universe of Discourse."

Lewis Carroll expressed the need for a universe of discourse as follows:

It sometimes happens that, in one or both of the Terms of a Proposition, the Name consists of Adjectives only, the Substantive being understood. In order to express such a Proposition fully, we must supply the Name of some Class which may be regarded as a Genus of which each Term is a Species...The Genus referred to is called the Universe of Discourse...

== Examples ==
For example, in an interpretation of first-order logic, the domain of discourse is the set of individuals over which the quantifiers range. A sentence such as ∀x (x^{2} ≠ 2) is ambiguous if no domain of discourse has been identified. In one interpretation, the domain of discourse could be the set of real numbers; in another interpretation, it could be the set of natural numbers. If the domain of discourse is the set of real numbers, the sentence is false, with x = √2 as counterexample; if the domain is the set of natural numbers, the sentence is true, since 2 is not the square of any natural number.

The binary relation called set membership, expressed as $x \in A$, and meaning that x belongs to set A, is clear enough. Every binary relation has a converse relation, and the converse of $\in$ is written $\ni$. Also, a binary relation must have a domain. The domain of the converse of set membership is the universe of discourse. Any subset of this universe may, or may not, contain x. A is a subset of this universe, not necessarily restricted to A.

== See also ==
- Domain of a function
- Domain theory
- Interpretation (logic)
- Quantifier (logic)
- Term algebra
- Universe (mathematics)
