= History of the Jews in England (1066–1290) =

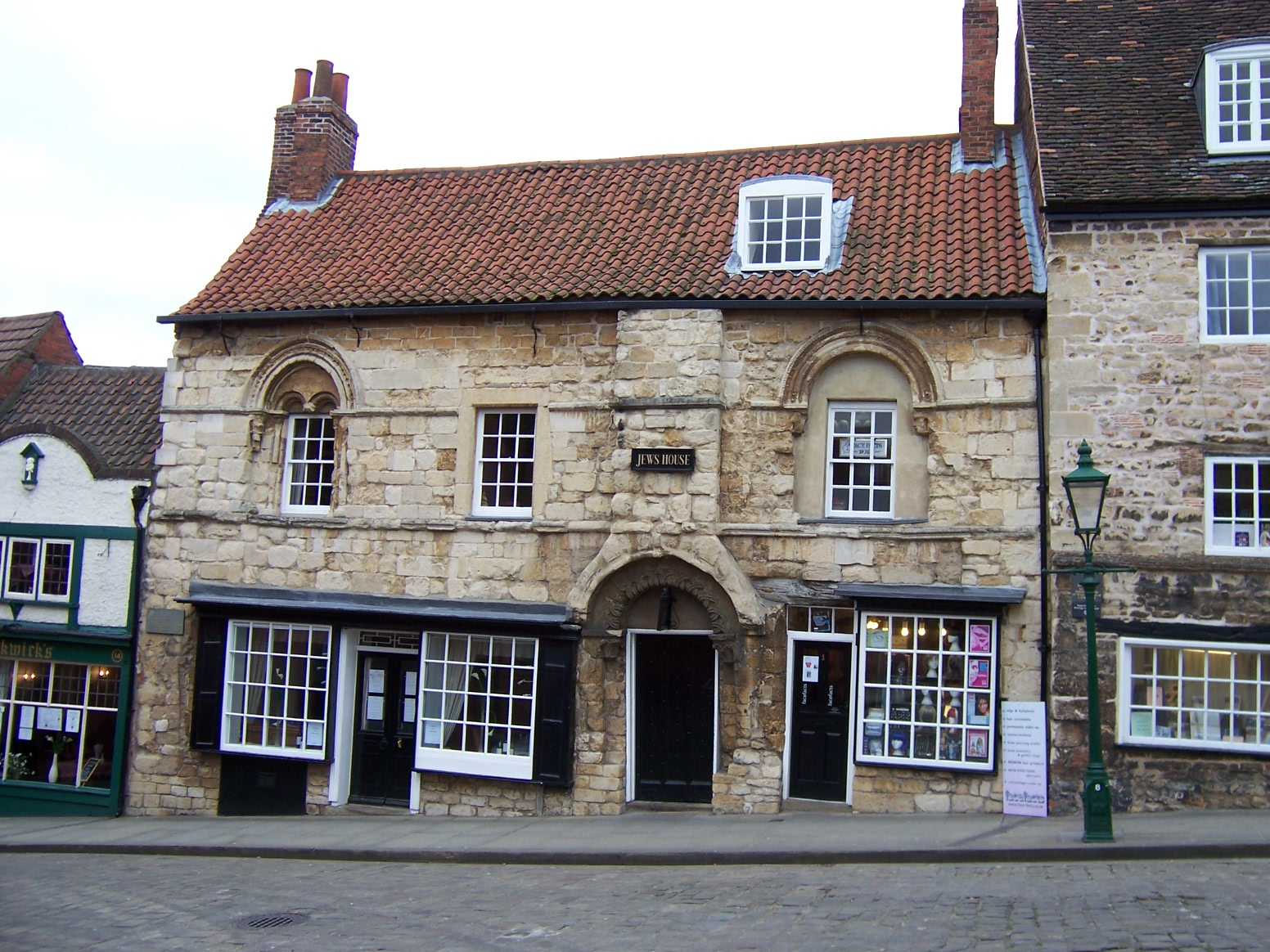
One of two surviving Jewish houses, the Jew's House in Lincoln, immediately below Jew's Court

The first-recorded Jews in England arrived after the Norman Conquest of the country by William the Conqueror (the future William I) in 1066, and the first written record of Jewish settlement in England dates from 1070. After the coin clipping crisis, with thousands of Jews accused in the late 13th century, all Jews were expelled from England after the Edict of Expulsion in 1290.

In some accounts, the latter half of the period is contrasted with the earlier half, in terms of rising persecution and violence, but evidence of tolerance between people living close to each other continues to be found throughout. Persecution and violence appear to have been imposed and incited by people with power, whether from the Church, the crown, or the aristocracy. Plenty of evidence for the peaceful coexistence of different religious populations exists from the thirteenth century, such as references to Gentiles attending Jewish weddings. Ultimately, the Jewish community was dependent on the Crown for their presence and protection as non-Christians, the attitude and response of the English Crown was decisive for their safety or lack of it.

The experience of English Jewry was particularly significant, both in terms of its political, economic, religious and social importance to England as a whole, and in terms of the development of antisemitism; many false accusations and associations were developed in England in this period, and prejudices were more deeply felt, than in other parts of Europe. Most notorious is the accusation of blood libel (ritual child murder), but also included an association of Jewry with international conspiracy and magic. Antisemitic prejudices were expressed in some of the "earliest and most elaborate" devotional artworks to do so, at Lincoln Cathedral and the Cloisters Cross, for example, or, more recently identified, the Hereford Mappa Mundi.

Edward I is also identified as internationally significant, as the first monarch to attempt state-sponsored conversions, to permanently exclude Jews from his kingdom, and the first English monarch to use antisemitism as an instrument of state policy.

The coin clipping crisis, ultimately leading to expulsion also led to the formation of a strong strain of antisemitism within English identity that outlasted the period, including the idea that England was unique precisely because it did not include Jews.

== William I to Henry I: 1066–1135 ==
There is no record of Jews in England before the Norman Conquest in 1066. The few references to Jews in the Anglo-Saxon laws of the Roman Catholic Church relate to Jewish practices about Easter.

Soon after William I's Conquest, Jewish merchants, probably from Rouen, in Normandy, began to settle in England. (Note: Per William of Malmesbury, they were invited, but this appears unlikely. See Roth 1964, p. 4) However, Jews were not permitted to own land or to participate in trades (except for medicine). They were limited primarily to money lending. As Catholic doctrine held that money lending for interest was the sin of usury, Jews dominated this activity. The earliest immigrants spoke Judeo-French founded on the Norman language.

Around 1092, Gilbert Crispin, the Abbot of Westminster, issued a disputation about his exchange with an erudite Jew, whom he knew as a friend and business colleague, entitled "Disputation of a Jew with a Christian about the Christian Bible." Crispin wrote:

Now on a certain day, God granted both him and me greater leisure than usual, and soon we began questioning as usual. And as his objections were consequent and logical, and as he explained with equal consequence his former objections, while our reply met his objections foot to foot and by his own confession seemed equally supported by the testimony of the Scriptures, some of the bystanders requested me to preserve our disputes as likely to be of use to others in future.

This disputation was notable for the even-handed presentation of both the Christian and Jewish points of view, and for the congenial tone of the exchange.

At first, the status of Jews was not strictly determined. An attempt was made to introduce the continental principle that all Jews were the king's property and a clause to that effect was inserted under King Henry I in some manuscripts of the so-called Leges Edwardi Confessoris "Laws of Edward the Confessor".

However, during Henry's reign (1100–1135) a royal charter was granted to Joseph, the chief rabbi of London, and all his followers. Under this charter, Jews were permitted to move about the country without paying tolls, to buy and sell goods and property, to sell their pledges after holding them a year and a day, to be tried by their peers, and to be sworn on the Torah rather than on a Christian Bible. Special weight was attributed to a Jewish person's oath, which was valid against that of twelve Christians, because they represented the king of England in financial matters. The sixth clause of the charter was especially important: it granted Jews the right of movement throughout the kingdom, as if they were the king's own property (sicut res propriæ nostræ).

Jews did not settle outside of London before 1135.

== Stephen to Henry II: 1135–1189 ==
Christian–Jewish relations in England were disturbed under King Stephen, who burned down the house of a Jewish man in Oxford (some accounts say with the owner in it) because he refused to pay a contribution to the king's expenses. It was also during this time that the first recorded blood libel against Jews was brought in the case of William of Norwich (March, 1144).

During the Rhineland massacres perpetrated in the People's Crusade in what is now France and Germany, outbursts against Jews in England were, according to the Jewish chroniclers, prevented by King Stephen.

With the restoration of order under Henry II, Jews renewed their activity. Within five years of his accession, Jews are found at London, Oxford, Cambridge, Norwich, Thetford, Bungay, Canterbury, Winchester, Newport, Stafford, Windsor and Reading. However, they were not permitted to bury their dead outside London until 1177. Their spread throughout the country enabled the king to draw upon them as occasion demanded; he repaid them by demanding notes on the sheriffs of the counties, who accounted for payments thus made in the half-yearly accounts on the pipe rolls.

Strongbow's conquest of Ireland (1170) was financed by Josce, a Jewish man from Gloucester; and the king accordingly fined Josce for having lent money to those under his displeasure. As a rule, however, Henry II does not appear to have limited in any way the financial activity of Jews. The favourable position of the English Jews was shown, among other things, by the visit of Abraham ibn Ezra in 1158, by that of Isaac of Chernigov in 1181, and by the resort to England of the Jews who were exiled by Philip II of France in 1182, among them probably being Judah ben Isaac Messer Leon.

In 1168, when concluding an alliance with Frederick Barbarossa, Henry II seized the chief representatives of the Jews and sent them to Normandy, while tallaging (Note: A "tallage" was a tax set on the whole Jewish population, of any amount the Crown desired. The yields declined over time as capital was drained from the Jewish community through excessive taxation.) the rest 5000 marks). When, however, he asked the rest of the country to pay the Saladin tithe for the Crusade in 1186, he demanded a quarter of the Jewish chattels. The tithe was reckoned at £70,000, the quarter at £60,000. It is improbable, however, that the whole amount was paid at once, as for many years after the imposition of the tallage, arrears were demanded from the Jews.

The king had probably been led to make this great demand upon English Jewry by the surprising windfall which came to his treasury at the death of Aaron of Lincoln. In this period, Aaron of Lincoln is believed to have been the wealthiest man in 12th-century Britain in terms of liquid assets. All property obtained by usury, whether Jewish or Christian, fell into the king's hands on Aaron's death; his estate included £15,000 of debts owed by some 430 debtors scattered around the English counties. To track down and collect these debts, a special section of the Exchequer was constituted, known as the "Aaron's Exchequer". The cash treasure of Aaron's estate that came into the king's hands, however, was lost on a shipwreck during a transport to Normandy.

In this era, Jews lived on good terms with their non-Jewish neighbours, including the clergy; they entered churches freely, and took refuge in the abbeys in times of commotion. Some Jews lived in opulent houses and helped to build a large number of abbeys and monasteries. However, by the end of Henry's reign, they had incurred the ill will of the upper classes, and anti-Jewish sentiment spread further throughout the nation, fostered by the crusades.

== Massacres at London, Bury and York (1189–1190) ==
External audio
- The Medieval Massacre of the Jews of York, Speaking with Shadows, published by English Heritage, retrieved 10 November 2019

Richard I had taken the cross before his coronation (3 September 1189). A number of the principal Jews of England presented themselves to do homage at Westminster; but there was a long-standing custom against Jews (and women) being admitted to the coronation ceremony, and they were expelled during the banquet which followed the coronation, whereupon they were attacked by a crowd of bystanders. The rumour spread from Westminster to London that the king had ordered a massacre of the Jews; and a mob in the Old Jewry, after vainly attacking the strong stone houses of the Jews throughout the day, set them on fire at night, killing those within who attempted to escape. The king was enraged at this insult to his royal dignity, but was unable to punish more than a few of the offenders, owing to their large numbers and to the considerable social standing of several of them. After his departure on the crusade, riots with loss of life occurred at Lynn, where some Jews attempted to attack a baptised coreligionist who had taken refuge in a church. The Christian population burned down the Jews' houses and murdered them. At Stamford Fair, on 7 March 1190, many were slain, and on 18 March, 57 were slaughtered at Bury St Edmunds. The Jews of Lincoln saved themselves only by taking refuge in the castle.

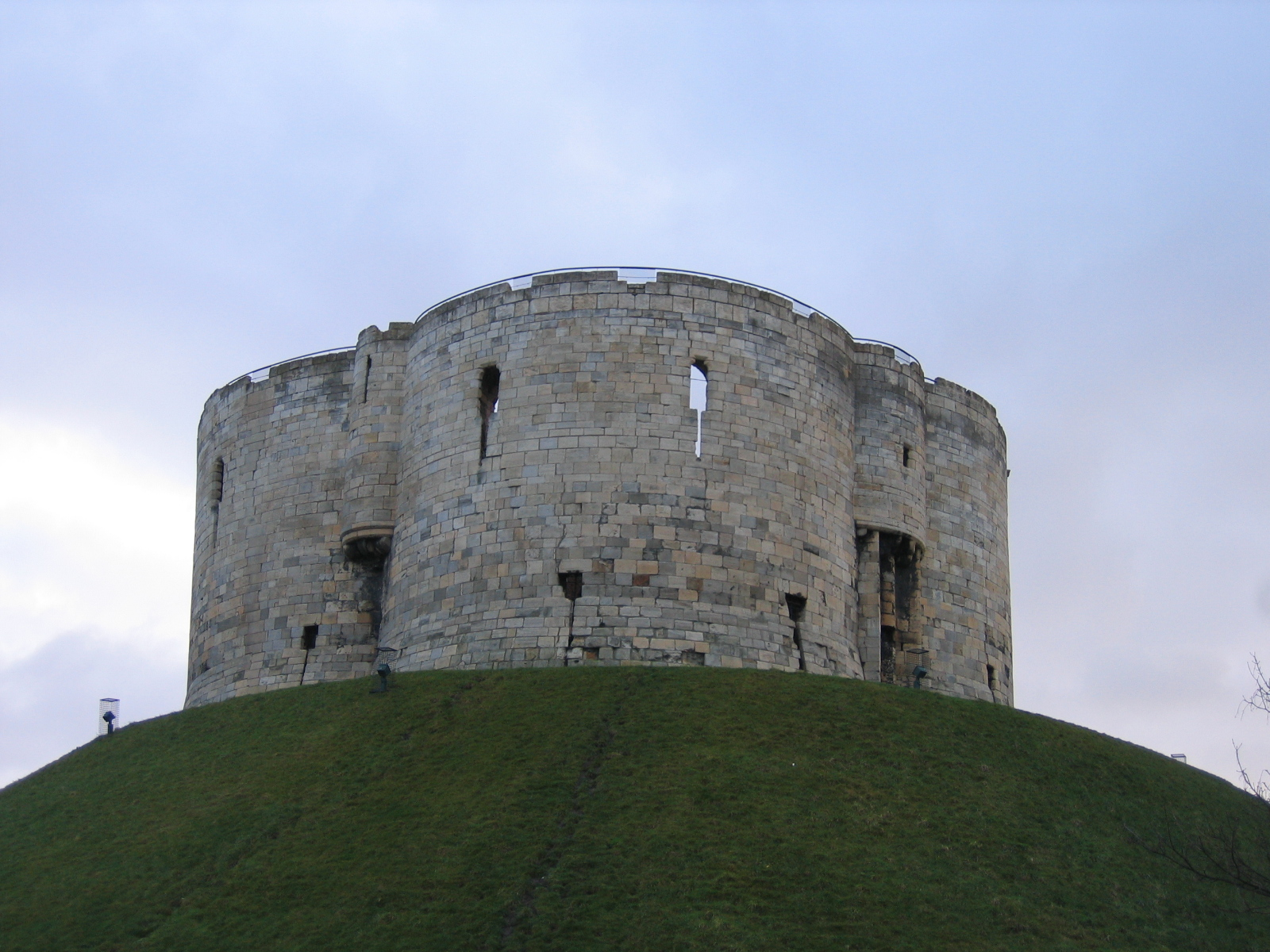
Clifford's Tower, where the Jews of York were killed in 1190

Isolated attacks on Jews also occurred at Colchester, Thetford and Ospringe.

A significant loss of life occurred at York on the night of 16 March (Shabbat HaGadol, the Shabbat before Passover) and 17 March 1190. As crusaders prepared to leave on the Third Crusade, religious fervour resulted in several incidents of anti-Jewish violence. Josce of York, the leader of the Jews in York, asked the warden of York Castle to receive them with their wives and children, and they were accepted into Clifford's Tower. The tower was then besieged by the mob of crusaders, demanding that the Jews convert to Christianity and be baptized. Trapped in the castle, the Jews were advised by their religious leader, Rabbi Yomtov of Joigny, to kill themselves rather than convert; Josce began by slaying his wife Anna and his two children, and then was killed by Yomtov. The father of each family killed his wife and children, before Yomtov and Josce set fire to the wooden keep, killing themselves. The handful of Jews who did not kill themselves died in the fire, or were murdered by rioters. Around 150 people are thought to have been killed in the incident.

== Ordinance of the Jewry, 1194 ==
During Richard's absence in the Holy Land and during his captivity, the Jews of England were harassed by William de Longchamp. The Jewish community was forced to contribute 5,000 marks toward the king's ransom, more than three times as much as the contribution of the City of London.

On his return, Richard determined to organise the Jewish community in order to ensure that he should no longer be defrauded of his just dues as universal legatee of the Jewry by any such outbreaks as those that occurred after his coronation. Richard accordingly decided, in 1194, that records should be kept by royal officials of all the transactions of the Jews, without which such transactions would not be legal.

Every debt was to be entered upon a chirograph, one part of which was to be kept by the Jewish creditor, and the other preserved in a chest to which only special officials should have access. By this means the king could at any time ascertain the property of any Jew in the land; and no destruction of the bond held by a Jew could release the creditor from his indebtedness.

This "Ordinance of the Jewry" was, in practice, the beginning of the office of Exchequer of the Jews, which made all the transactions of the English Jewry liable to taxation by the King of England, who thus became a sleeping partner in all the transactions of Jewish money lending. The king besides demanded two bezants in the pound, that is, 10 per cent, of all sums recovered by the Jews with the aid of his courts.

At this point in time Jews had many of the same rights as gentile citizens, but their loans could be recovered at law, whereas the Christian money lender could not recover more than his original loan. They were in direct relation to the king and his courts; but this did not imply any arbitrary power of the king to tax them or to take their money without repayment, as is frequently exemplified in the pipe rolls.

== Leadership of the Chief Rabbis, 13th century ==
Jews were allowed to have their own jurisdiction, and there is evidence of their having a beth din with three judges. Reference is made to the parnas (president) and gabbai (treasurer), of the congregation, and to scribes and chirographers. A complete system of education seems to have been in vogue.

At the head of the Jewish community was placed a chief rabbi, known as "the presbyter of all the Jews of England"; he appears to have been selected by the Jews themselves, who were granted a congé d'élire by the king. The latter claimed, however, the right of confirmation, as in the case of bishops. The Jewish presbyter was indeed in a measure a royal official, holding the position of adviser, as regards Jewish law, to the Exchequer of the Jews, as the English legal system admitted the validity of Jewish law in its proper sphere as much as it did that of the canon law.

Six presbyters are known in the 13th century: Jacob of London, reappointed 1200; Josce of London, 1207; Aaron of York, 1237; Elyas of London, 1243; Hagin fil Cresse, 1257; and Cresse fil Mosse.

== Under John, 1205–1216 ==
As early as 1198 Pope Innocent III had written to all Christian princes, including Richard of England, calling upon them to compel the remission of all usury demanded by Jews from Christians. This would render the Jewish community's very existence impossible.

On 15 July 1205, the pope laid down the principle that Jews were doomed to perpetual servitude because they had crucified Jesus. In England the secular power soon followed the initiative of the Church. John, having become indebted to the Jewish community while in Ireland, at first treated Jews with a show of forbearance. He confirmed the charter of Rabbi Josce and his sons, and made it apply to all the Jews of England; he wrote a sharp remonstrance to the mayor of London against the attacks that were continually being made upon the Jews of that city, alone of all the cities of England. He reappointed one Jacob archpriest of all the English Jews (12 July 1199).

With the loss of Normandy in 1205 John changed his attitude to the Jews. After his triumph over the pope, he demanded the sum of £100,000 from the religious houses of England, and 66,000 marks from the Jews (1210). One of the latter, Abraham of Bristol, refused to pay his quota of 10,000 marks, and by order of the king had seven of his teeth extracted, one a day, until he paid.

The Jewish community were an important element on John's side in the triangular struggle between king, barons and municipalities which made up the constitutional history of England during his reign and that of his son. In the Magna Carta, clauses were inserted preventing the king or his Jewish subjects from obtaining interest during the minority of an heir.

== Increasing persecution, 13th century ==
With the accession of Henry III (1216) the position of the Jews became somewhat easier, but only for a short time. Innocent III had in the preceding year caused the Fourth Council of the Lateran to pass the law enforcing the Badge upon the Jews; and in 1218 Stephen Langton, Archbishop of Canterbury, brought it into operation in England, the badge taking the form of an oblong white patch of two finger-lengths by four. The action of the Church was followed by similar opposition on the part of the English boroughs.

Petitions were accordingly sent to the king in many instances to remove his Jews from the boroughs, and they were expelled from Bury St. Edmunds in 1190, Newcastle in 1234, Wycombe in 1235, Southampton in 1236, Berkhamsted in 1242, Newbury in 1244. Simon de Montfort issued an edict to expel the Jewish population from Leicester in 1231, "in my time or in the time of any of my heirs to the end of the world". He justified his action as being "for the good of my soul, and for the souls of my ancestors and successors". The Jews appear to have found refuge in the suburbs outside his control.

The Papacy continued to develop its theological commitment to restrictions on Judaism and Jews. In England, a number of Benedictine priories showed particular hostility to Jews, or sought to capitalize on it. The fictional stories of Jewish ritual murder, for instance, emerged from Benedictine priories, apparently attempting to set competing local cults. In Worcester, Bishop William de Blois pushed for tighter restrictions on Jews, writing to Pope Gregory IX for assistance in enforcing segregation between Jews and Christians, including wearing of badges and prohibitions on Christians working for Jews especially within their homes.

The value of the Jewish community to the royal treasury had become considerably lessened during the 13th century through two circumstances: the king's income from other sources had continually increased, and the contributions of the Jews had decreased both absolutely and relatively. Besides this, the king had found other sources from which to obtain loans. Italian merchants, "pope's usurers" as they were called, supplied him with money, at times on the security of the Jewry. By the contraction of the area in which Jews were permitted to exercise their money-lending activity their means of profit were lessened, while the king by his continuous exactions prevented the automatic growth of interest.

By the middle of the 13th century, the Jews of England, like those of the Continent, had become chattels of the king. There appeared to be no limit to the exactions he could impose upon them, though it was obviously against his own interest to deprive them entirely of capital, without which they could not gain for him interest. The great financial pressure Henry placed on the Jews caused them to force repayment of loans to the sale of bonds, fueling anti-Jewish resentment. Taxation of 20,000 marks in 1241, £40,000 in 1244, £50,000 twice in 1250, meant that taxation in 1240–1255 amounted to triple the taxation raised in 1221–1239. Bonds were seized for a fraction of their value when cash payments could not be met, resulting in land wealth being transferred to courtiers. Jewish bonds were purchased and used by richer Barons and members of Henry III's royal circle as a means to acquire lands of lesser landholders, through payment defaults. Licoricia of Winchester is an example of a Jew who was forced to contribute £2,500, towards the construction of the Edward the Confessor shrine in Westminster Abbey, in addition to 5,000 marks taken from the estate of her husband David of Oxford on his death in 1244.

Henry had built the Domus Conversorum in London in 1232 to help convert Jews to Christianity, and efforts intensified after 1239. As many as 10 per cent of the Jews in England had been converted by the late 1250s in large part due to their deteriorating economic conditions.

=== Blood libels and Little Saint Hugh of Lincoln ===
Many anti-Jewish stories involving tales of child sacrifice circulated in the 1230s–1250s, including the account of "Little Saint Hugh of Lincoln" in 1255. The event is considered particularly important, as the first such accusation endorsed by the Crown. In August 1255, a number of the chief Jews who had assembled at Lincoln to celebrate the marriage of a daughter of Berechiah de Nicole were seized on a charge of having murdered a boy named Hugh. Henry intervened to order the execution of Copin, who had confessed to the murder in return for his life, and removed 91 Jews to the Tower of London. Eighteen were executed, and their property expropriated by the Crown. The king had mortgaged the Jewish community to his brother Richard of Cornwall in February 1255, for 5,000 marks, and had lost all rights over it for a year, Henry thus receiving no income from it except in the case of executions. The story was referred to in later English literature including Chaucer and Marlowe, and entered popular folk culture through a contemporary ballad. It was quoted as fact by Thomas Fuller in his posthumous 1662 book Worthies of England.

=== Further restrictions and the Statute of Jewry 1253 ===
Henry III passed the Statute of Jewry in 1253, which attempted to stop the construction of synagogues and reinforce the wearing of Jewish badges (rather than accepting fines). A prohibition on Christian servants working for Jews was to reduce the 'risk' of sexual contact, also prohibited. It remains unclear to what extent this statute was actually implemented by Henry. The laws themselves were following the Catholic church's existing pronouncements.

In the later 1250s, as Henry was not fully in control over government, the Barons asked for limits on the resale of Jewish bonds. Jewish loans became a motivating factor in the following war. Henry's policies up to 1258 of excessive Jewish taxation, anti-Jewish legislation and propaganda had caused a very important and negative change.

=== Targeting of Jews during the conflict with the Barons ===
While the level of debts to Jewish moneylenders was in fact lower in the 1260s than the 1230s, Henry III's policies had made the landowning classes fear that debts to Jews would lead to them being deprived of their lands, which were used to secure loans. Excessive taxation of Jews, forcing them to collect no matter what the circumstances, was one factor in this. Another was the King's support for courtiers and relatives who bought Jewish loans in order to dispossess defaulters of their landholdings. These were the fears that de Montfort and his supporters played on to bring support to their rebellion.

With the outbreak of the Barons' war violent measures were adopted to remove all traces of indebtedness either to the king or to the higher barons. The Jewries of London, Canterbury, Northampton, Winchester, Cambridge, Worcester and Lincoln, were looted (1263–1265), and the archæ (official chests of records) either destroyed or deposited at the headquarters of the barons at Ely.

Simon de Montfort, who in 1231 had expelled the Jews from his town of Leicester, when at the height of his power after the battle of Lewes cancelled the debts and interest owed to Jews of around 60 men, including those held by his baronial supporters.

Montfort had been accused of sharing the plunder but issued edicts for their protection after the battle. Nevertheless, his closest allies including two of his sons had led the violence and killing, so it seems implausible to regard him as ignorant of the likely consequences of the campaign.

=== Later policies of Henry III ===
Once de Montfort was dead and the rebels were defeated, Henry's policy went into reverse and as best as he was able, the debts were reimposed. However, Henry's finances were very weak, and he also wished to pursue the Crusade that he had tried to mount in the 1250s. Parliament refused to comply without legislation that restricted the abuse of Jewish finances, particularly by Christians. In 1269 Henry agreed to limits on perpetual fee-rents, an end to the sale of Jewish loans to Christians without the permission of the Crown and a prohibition on levying interest on loans purchased by Christians. These were the grievances that had helped fuel the wider crisis since 1239. In 1271 he conceded a ban on Jews holding freehold land and again ordered that the previous legislation be enforced. Nevertheless, these policies would not be adequate in allaying wider fears, which quickly resurfaced under Edward I.

In Lincoln, Henry III ordered for a man by the name of Jopin, who was accused of murdering and torturing an eight- or nine-year-old Christian boy in a witchcraft ceremony, to be killed along with another 91 Jews and all to be sent to London. When the executions were ongoing in London, Richard, Earl of Cornwall stopped the executions while 18 had already died. Similar cases happened in London and Northampton in the 1260s and 1270s.

== Edward I and the Expulsion ==
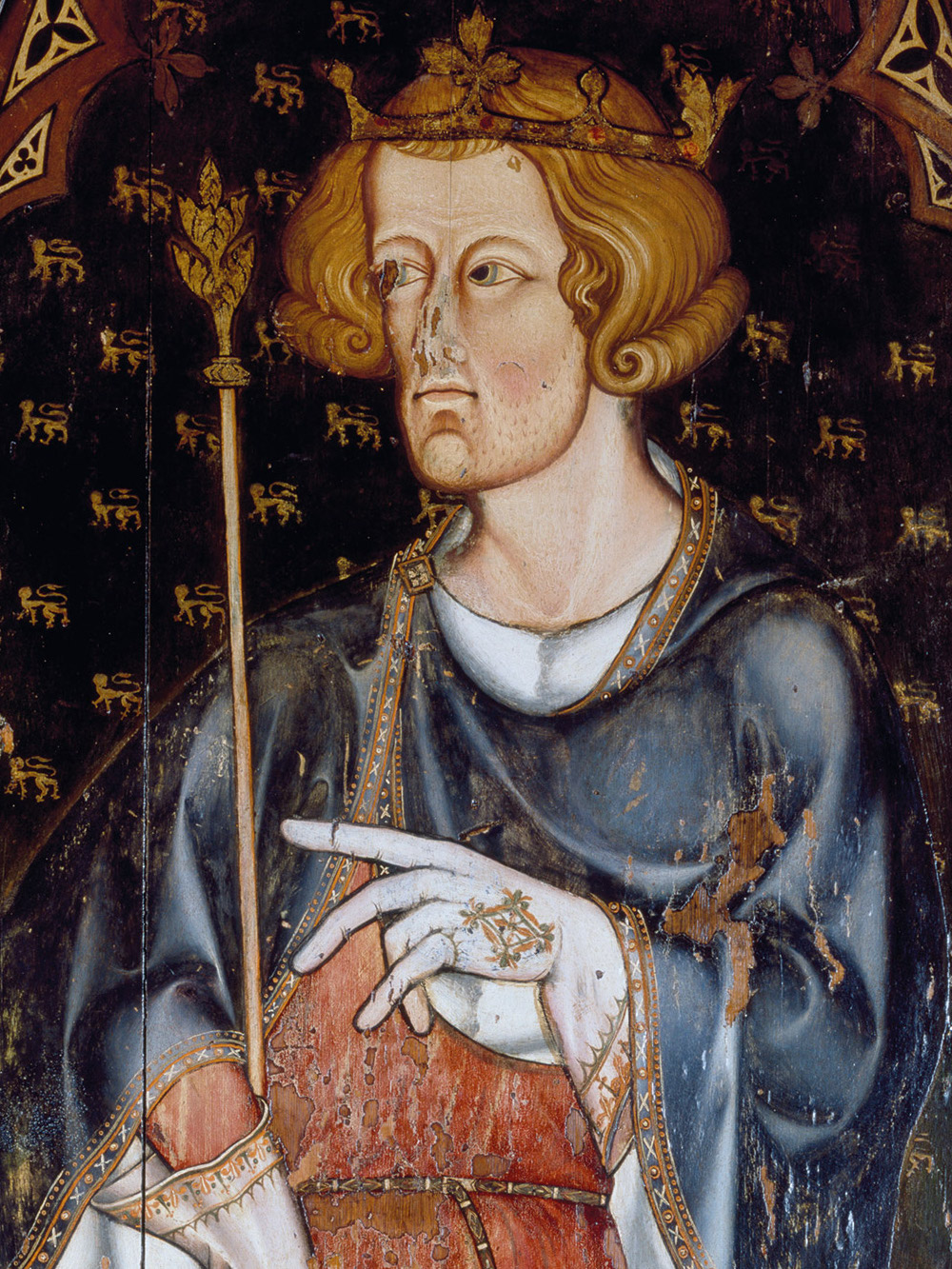
Edward I was the first English monarch to use antisemitism as an instrument of state policy.

Edward I is noted for his violence against the Welsh and Scots, but his reputation concerning the Jews is not well recognized. This has been a matter of controversy for scholars concerned with Jewish history, who see a blind spot in works of general history failing to explain his actions and prejudices. For contemporaries, however, his reputation was noted, and the events of the Expulsion even seen in a global context; for instance in the widely circulated Commendatio lamentabilis (Note: In full, the Commendatio lamentabilis in transitu magni regis Edwardi) dedicated to him after his death, he was said to be greater than the Pharaohs for his expulsion of the Jewry.

Edward can be said to be the first English monarch to use antisemitism as an instrument of government policy. Prior to his reign, Kings had generally tried to preserve their ability to extract taxation from Jews, so had acted to limit violence and other attacks on them. Antisemitism had been utilised by opponents to the crown, rather than by the crown itself, but during the reign of Edward I antisemitism was "deliberately deployed and developed in the interests of the English state". Edward began to take measures which were designed to focus discontent on Jews, or to take credit for acting against them; most significantly through the allegations of coin-clipping which labelled the entire Jewish community as criminals. He also appears to have taken a strong interest in specific actions taken against Jews, such as in cases of alleged blasphemy by Jews.

There is disagreement about the motivations behind some of Edward's actions. It is possible to see some of Edward's actions as purely financially inspired, including ultimately the Expulsion, which can be seen as primarily a concession to Parliament in return for grants of taxation. This tends to be the conventional view, but risks underestimating his own "sincere religious bigotry" especially when considering other actions made in the run up to the Expulsion.

Other questions of controversy include whether Edward's attempts to convert Jews to Christianity or provide them with alternative employment to money lending when usury was banned were genuine. These can be interpreted as positive steps or as cynical actions that were certain to fail. It is difficult to know what was in Edward's mind, as there is not a documentary record for it, other than official statements and justifications. It is also possible to infer the likely influences on him, from his relatives and advisers, many of whom were extremely hostile to Jews, such as Robert Grosseteste.

Edward's restrictions on Jews took place in an environment where Church leaders, including figures like Thomas de Cantilupe and his successor as Bishop of Hereford, Richard Swinefield, were campaigning for harsher measures against Jewish communities. In this, they were supported by the Holy See, which through his reign, introduced progressively tougher calls to separate Jews from gentiles, through enforcement of the wearing of Jewish badges, and restrictions on social contact.

Jews were expelled from some towns, often where they had been long present. With Edward's permission, they were expelled from the dower lands of his mother Eleanor of Provence in January 1275, which included towns such as Marlborough, Gloucester, Cambridge and Worcester. Other local expulsions took place in Newcastle-upon-Tyne, Warwick, Wycombe (1234), Northamptonshire (1237), Newbury (1243), Derby (1261), Romsey (1266), Winchelsea (1273), Bridgnorth (1274) and Windsor (1283). Jews were banned from entering any of the new north Welsh boroughs created by Edward I under their town charters.

=== Statutum de Judaismo, 1275 ===
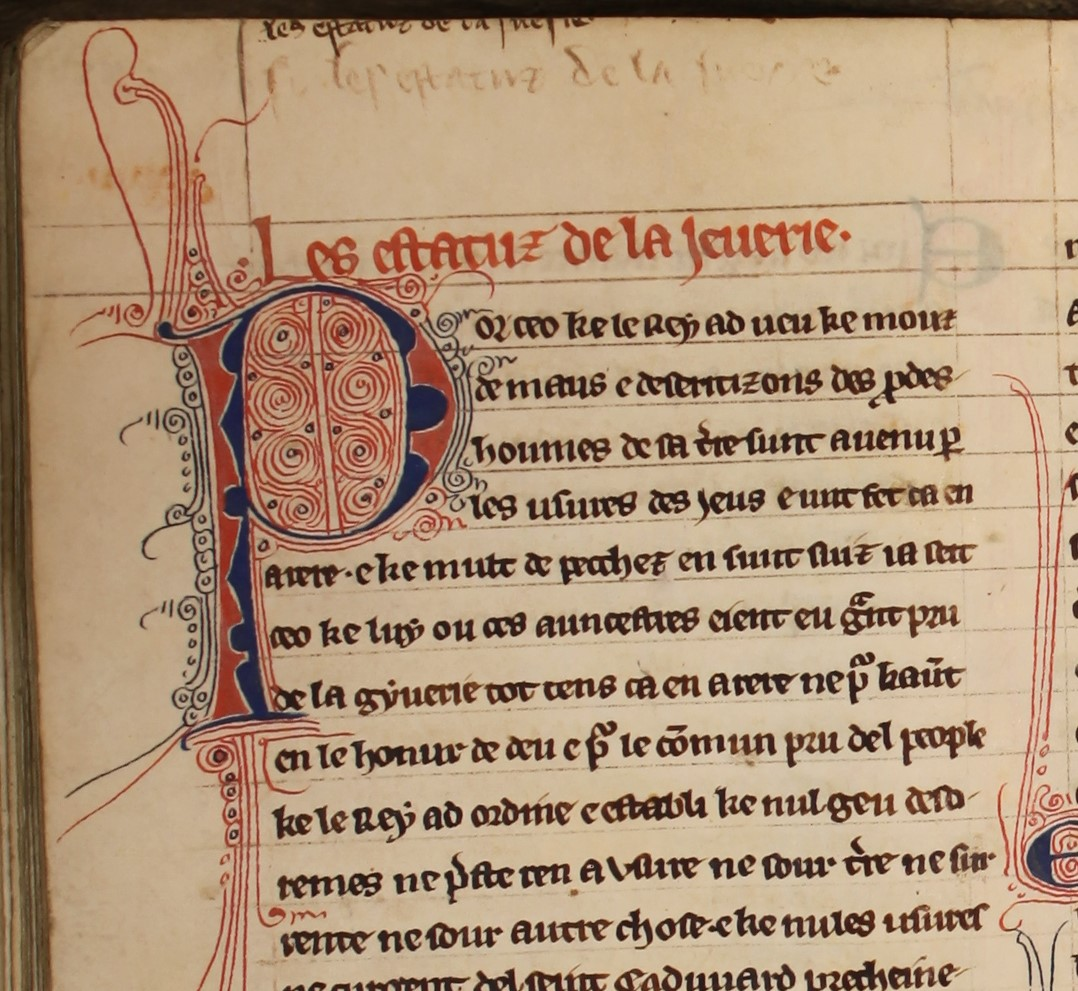
Extract of the Statute of Jewry, c. 1275

Edward I returned from the Crusades in 1274, two years after his accession as King of England. In 1275, he made some experimental decrees. The Church laws against usury had recently been reiterated with more than usual vehemence at the Second Council of Lyon (1274), and Edward in the Statutum de Judaismo (Statute of the Jewry) absolutely forbade Jews to lend on usury (their primary business), but granted them permission to engage in commerce and handicrafts, and even to take farms for a period not exceeding ten years, though he expressly excluded them from all the feudal advantages of the possession of land.

This permission to own land, however, regarded as a means by which Jews in general could gain a livelihood, was largely illusory. Farming can not be taken up at a moment's notice, nor can handicrafts be acquired at once. Moreover, in England in the 13th century the guilds were already securing a monopoly of all skilled labour, and in the majority of markets only those could buy and sell who were members of the Guild Merchant.

By depriving the Jews of a resort to usury, Edward was practically preventing them from earning a living under the conditions of life then existing in feudal England; and in principle the "Statute of the Jewry" expelled them fifteen years before the final expulsion. Some of the Jews attempted to evade the law by lending money against goods to be received. Others joined the Domus Conversorum and a proportion left the country.

Despite the impoverished state of the Jews, Edward I continued to try to exact taxation. A talage was exacted in 1277 and 1278, the latter yielding just 3,000 marks. Threats were made to defaulters, including exile and loss of their property, but this meant little to the vast majority of Jews who were poor and unable to pay the sums demanded by the state. The Crown ceased demanding talages, a fact that Richardson calls "significant". The community had run out of money.

In 1287–1288, yielding around £4,000 of a hoped for £13,333, it is likely that the Crown arrested the Jewish population prior to collecting the tax as a means of extorting as much as possible.

=== Exploitation of Jewish debts by the Crown ===
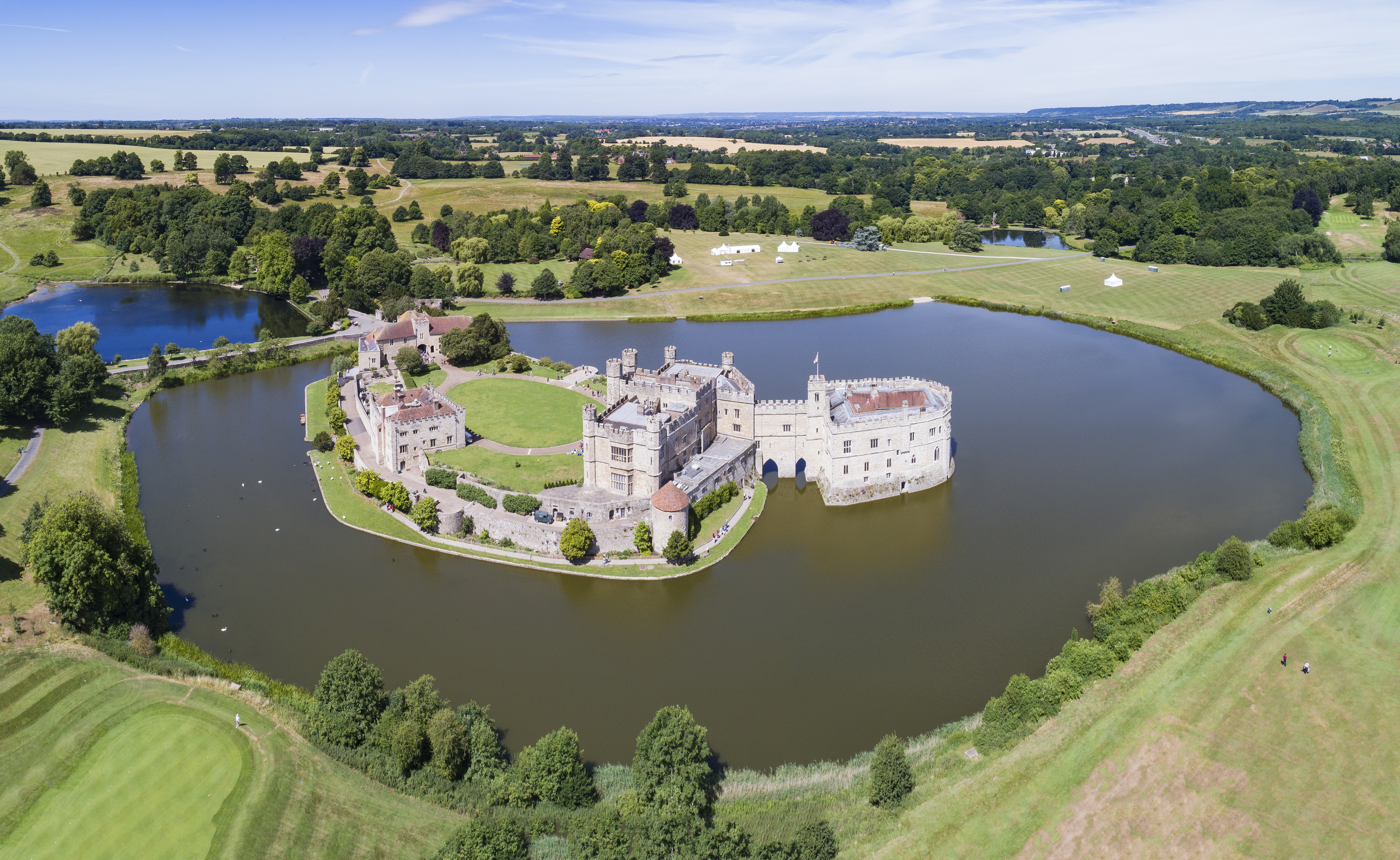
Leeds Castle, acquired at vast discount by Edward's wife Eleanor of Castile through the forced sale of debt bonds from Jews

From the 1270s onwards, the Crown stepped up the acquisition of land from indebted English landowners by forcing the sale of debt bonds held by Jews. Since the early 1200s, the Jewish community had been taxed well beyond its means, leading to a reduction in the capital the small number of rich Jewish moneylenders had to support their lending. Jews were also disallowed from holding land assets. To recoup against a defaulted debt, the bonds for the lands could be sold. Continued excessive tallages would force Jewish lenders to sell their bonds very cheaply to release their capital, which would be bought by courtiers, Edward and, most prominently, his wife Eleanor of Castile. Access to the purchase of Jewish bonds was in effect a form of royal patronage.

By the 1270s, this had led the Jewish community into a desperate position, while Edward, Eleanor and a few others gained vast new estates. Contemporaries, however, saw the problem as resulting from Jewish "usury" which contributed to a rise in antisemitic beliefs. Eleanor's participation in "Jewish usury" and dispossession of middling landowners caused her to be criticised both by members of the landed classes and by the church. A spectacular example of an estate picked up cheaply can be seen in the release of Leeds Castle to Edward and Eleanor by William de Leybourne, which became a favourite residence.

Discontent built up about these transactions, and fed into the political demands made by the landowning classes for restrictions on the Jews, both financial and social. Concerns were also picked up by the church, with the Archbishop of Canterbury, John Peckham, writing to her to warn her against acquiring "lands which the Jews have extorted with usury from Christians under the protection of the royal court".

=== Coin clipping crisis ===
During the 1270s and '80s, the Crown attempted to crack down on tampering with coins by "clipping" the edges. The Crown organised arrests in 1276, and then further mass arrests of Jews in 1278. This took place in the context of diminishing tax returns from the Jewish community, while Edward was in extreme financial difficulties.

Approximately 600 Jews were imprisoned in 1278, probably representing nearly every Jewish head of household, as the Jewish population stood at no more than 3,000 at the time. Two hundred and ninety-eight Jews were executed in London alone. Instructions to justices administering the process "made plain that the proceedings were unequivocally anti-Jewish" and extended their remit to blasphemy charges. There is evidence of Edward regularly briefing (viva voce) leading actors, especially regarding the seizure and disposal of property, but also regarding sentencing, including late in the process, to rein back the numbers being sentenced to death.

Overall, in the 1270–1290 period, slightly more Christians than Jews were arrested, but nearly ten times more Jews were executed than Christians, indicating that "religious prejudice was the crucial factor involved in the degree of punishment". In the short term, profits were made by the Crown from seizures and fines, but there was no improvement of the coinage itself; problems with the coinage persisted well into the 1300s.

Property from the condemned was forfeit, and anything that had been hidden or was dealt with after the trials was due to Queen Eleanor, who thereby profited extensively from the executions. An identifiable £16,500 (equivalent to £19,189,033 in 2025) was collected by the Crown in fines and sales of seized assets over a five-year period.

=== Intervention of the Church ===
In Easter 1285, the Prelates, (senior church leaders) of the Province of Canterbury under Peckham's leadership drew up complaints to Edward, two of which were regarding what they saw as lax restrictions on Jews. They complained about converts lapsing back to Judaism, and called for a crack down on usury, which although banned since 1275 under the Statute of the Jewry, they believed was still being practiced, asking that "the Jews' fraud and malice be vigorously opposed". Edward replied that there was little that could be done,"because of their evilness". In response, the prelates expressed their shock and stated that the Crown was permitting Jews to "ensnare Christians through usurious contracts and to acquire the manors of nobles through the sink of usury". Edward was, they said, capable of stopping this "perversity", and advised that "through the threat of horrible punishments, which our lips will not name, he may strive to punish all userers".

Relations between Christians and Jews could be convivial, but was in theory at least heavily restricted, and a matter the church viewed as highly threatening. The Bishop of Hereford, Richard Swinefield, was outraged when in early summer 1286 when he heard that a Jew had invited local dignitaries to a wedding. First, he demanded that nobody attend, "under pain of canonical discipline". The Jews, he said, "have invited—not secretly but quite openly—some of our Christians in order to disparage the Christian faith of which they are the enemies and preach heresies to the simple people thus generating scandal by their intercourse". (Note: The full quote reads: "how great and how full of losses and perils is intercourse between Christians and Jews ... although Christian charity suffers patiently (these Jews) who are by their own fault condemned to perpetual servitude they scruple not to our contempt and insults on Christians. We have learned from sundry reports that on Wednesday after the feast of St. Bartholomew they (Aaron's family) have made preparations for a marriage feast ... to which they have invited—not secretly but quite openly—some of our Christians in order to disparage the Christian faith of which they are the enemies and preach heresies to the simple people thus generating scandal by their intercourse. We therefore bid and enjoin on you ... to make it known in all churches of the diocese that no Christian is to take part in festivities of this kind, under pain of canonical discipline.")

When Swinefield was disobeyed, he threatened those who had attended the wedding with excommunication, unless they repented and he was given "satisfaction". He reported the whole affair directly to the Papal See, in part as he was at the time concerned with securing the canonization of his predecessor Thomas de Cantilupe. It is often believed that this correspondence led to Pope Honorius's intervention demanding that restrictions on Christian-Jewish relations in England be applied rigorously.

Whether related to Swinefield's complaints or not, in late 1286, Pope Honorius IV addressed a special rescript to the Archbishops of York and Canterbury claiming that the Jews had an evil effect on religious life in England through free interaction with Christians and called for action to be taken to prevent it. The Church responded with the Synod of Exeter in 1287, restating the Church laws against commensality between Jews and Christians, enforcing the wearing of Jewish badges and prohibiting Jews from holding public office, have Christian servants, or appear in public during Easter. Jewish physicians were also forbidden to practise and the ordinances of the Synod of Oxford of 1222 which prohibited the construction of new synagogues and the entry of Jews into Churches were restated.

=== Expulsion of the Jews from Gascony ===
Local expulsions of Jews were not new. They had happened frequently in many countries, and regularly in England. Edward would have been very conscious of these. In 1275, Edward had permitted the Queen mother Eleanor, to expel Jews from her lands, which included a number of towns with significant Jewish populations.

In 1287, Edward was in need of cash to free Charles of Salerno and ordered the local Jews expelled from the duchy of Gascony. This and other heavy expenses led to the need to raise revenues wherever he was able. As a result, some historians link the expulsion of Gascony's Jews and the seizure of their property and transfer of outstanding to the King's name to this need for cash. Others believe that the amounts raised were in fact small and note that they seem to have been distributed to mendicant orders in Aquitaine, and conclude it is more plausible to see the expulsion as a "thank-offering" for Edward's recovery from illness.

Charles of Salerno himself expelled the Jews of Maine and Anjou in 1289, accusing them of "dwelling randomly" with the Christian population and cohabiting with Christian women. Understanding that he would suffer financially, he linked the expulsion to general taxation of the population as "recompense". Huscroft speculates that Edward and Charles learnt from each other in the model of expulsion which Edward shortly after implemented in England.

=== Expulsion, 1290 ===
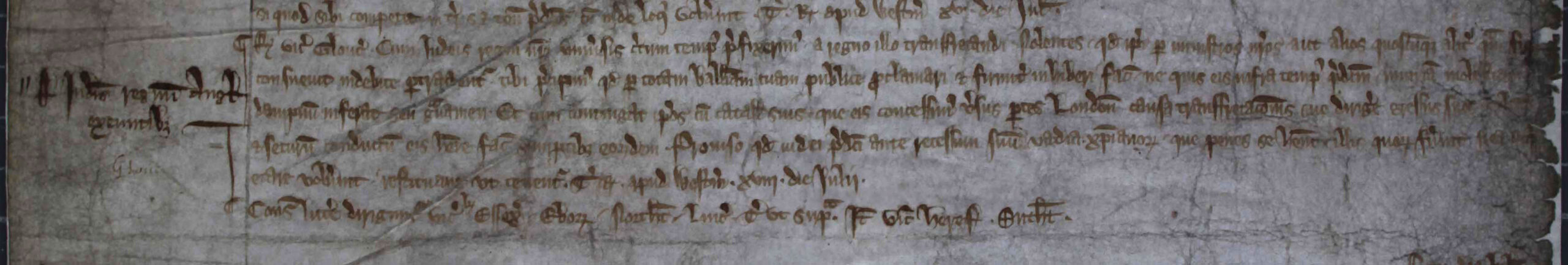
Letter from King Edward I to the Sheriff of Gloucester, dated 18 July 1290

By the time he returned to England in 1289, King Edward was deeply in debt. His experiment to convert the Jews to Christianity and remove their dependence on lending at interest could be seen to have failed. Moreover, it was increasingly impossible to raise money from the Jewish population; they had been repeatedly overtaxed.

On 14 June 1290, he summoned Knights of the shires to attend Parliament by 15 July. Then, on 18 June, Edward sent secret orders to the Sheriffs of cities with Jewish residents that the archae (Note: An Archa, or "chest" was kept by the sheriff in each town with an officially Jewry to record debts held by the Jews of the town. In this way, the Crown could easily assess the wealth and taxability of Jews across the country. They were frequently targeted in pogroms organised, for instance, by Simon de Montfort and his supporters.) containing records of Jewish debts be sealed.

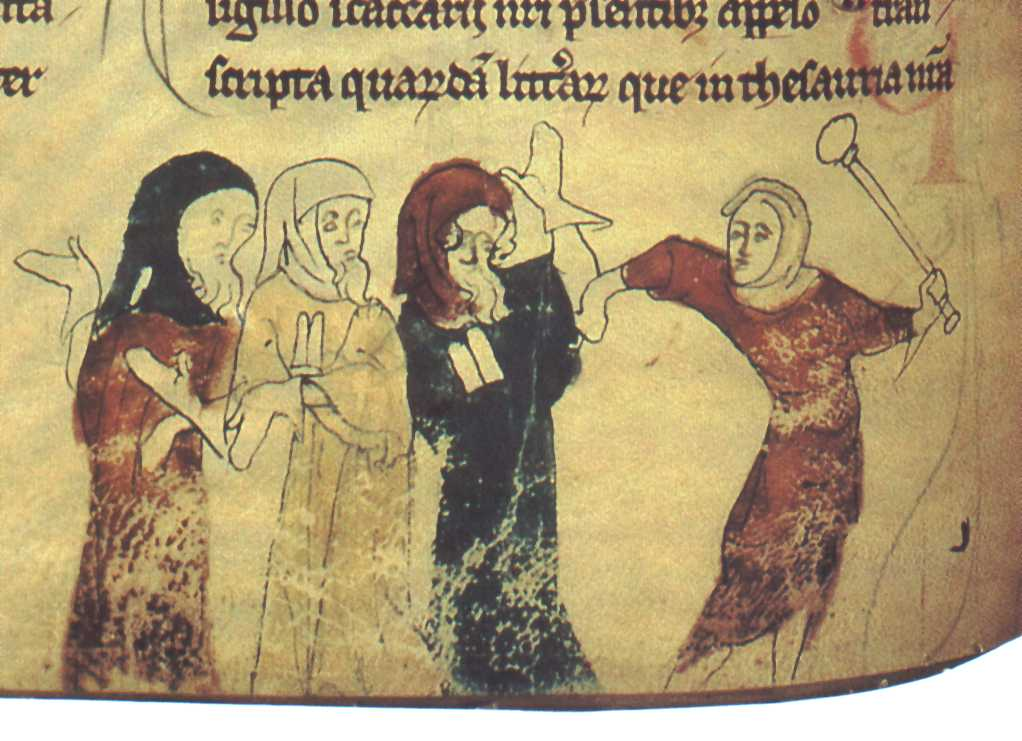
Image from the Rochester Chronicle depicting the expulsion

Parliament met on 15 July. Taxation granted by Parliament to Edward was very high, at £116,000, probably the highest of the Middle Ages, apparently in return for the expulsion of the Jews. The Church later voluntarily agreed to pay tax of a tenth, in gratitude.

On the Hebrew calendar, this date was 9 Av (Tisha B'Av) 5050, commemorating the fall of the Temple at Jerusalem; it is unlikely to be a coincidence, and was noted "with awe" by Jewish chroniclers. Writs were sent to Sheriffs on the same day, explaining that all Jews were to leave by All Saints' Day, 1 November 1290.

Proclamations were made ordering the population not to "injure, harm, damage or grieve" the departing Jews. Wardens at the Cinque Ports were to told to make arrangements for their safe passage. There were limits on the property that Jews could take with them. Although a few favoured persons were allowed to sell their homes before they left, the vast majority had to forfeit any outstanding debts, homes or immobile property, including Synagogues and cemeteries.

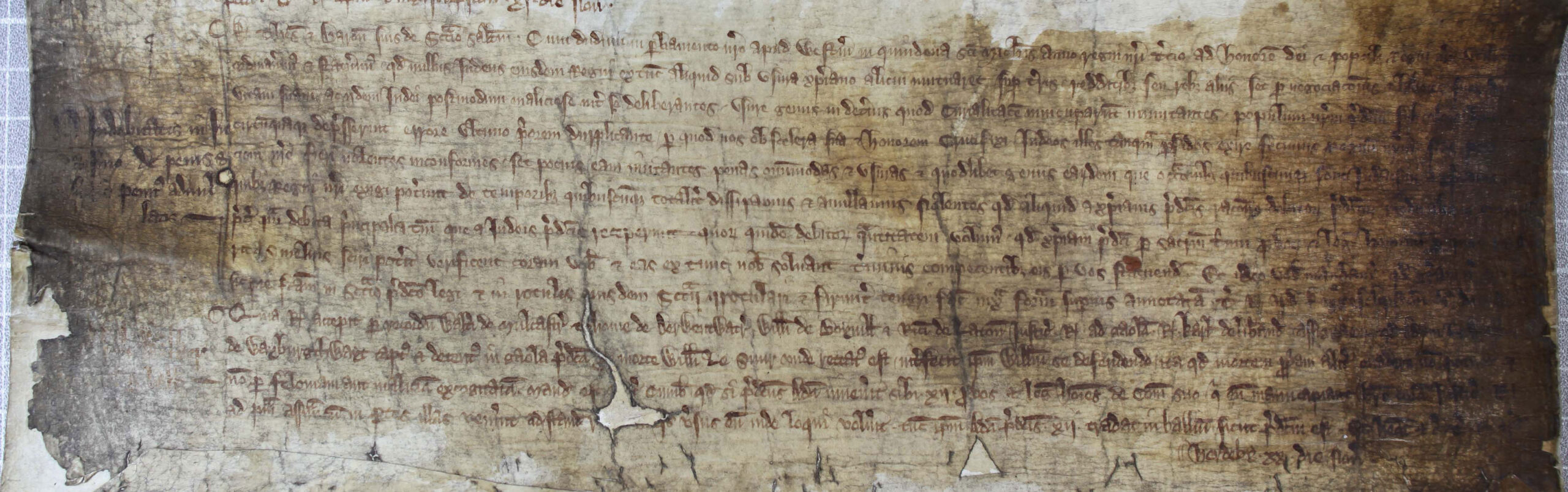
Letter from King Edward I to the Treasurer and Barons of the Exchequer, dated 5 November 1290

Henry wrote to the Barons of his Exchequer on 5 November, giving us the clearest official explanation of his actions available. In it, he claimed that Jews had broken trust with him by continuing to find ways to charge interest on loans. He labelled them as criminals and traitors, and said they were expelled "in honour of the Crucified". Interest on their debts was to be cancelled.

Although it is believed that most of the Jews leaving England were able to do so free from harm, there are some records of piracy leading to the death of some of the people forced to leave. In October, a ship was chartered by poorer London Jews whose captain convinced the Jews to walk with him on a sandbank, and left them stranded on it. Other incidents of piracy and murder are recorded in Portsmouth and near Burnham-on-Crouch in Essex.

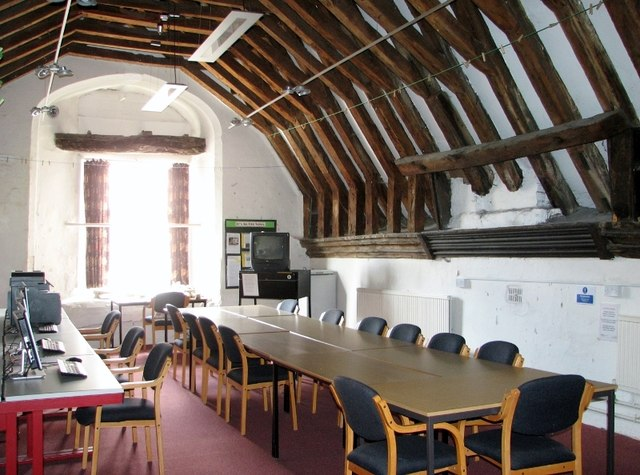
167 and 169 King Street, The Music House, Norwich: one of two surviving Jewish houses dating from before the expulsion. Such properties were forfeit and sold or gifted by the Crown.

The condition of the sea in Autumn also led to deaths, as poorer Jewish passengers crossed the Channel to Wissant near Calais. Ships were lost at sea, others arrived with their passengers destitute. It is unclear where most of the migrants went. There are Anglo-Jewish names and documents recorded in France, Germany, Italy and Spain; including the title deeds to an English monastery found in the wood store of a synagogue in Cairo.

For the Crown, there was an immediate windfall in terms of Jewish property to be sold. Some of the property was given away to courtiers, the church and family, in a total of 85 grants. For example, Queen Eleanor's tailor was granted the Synagogue in Canterbury. Property sales were mostly completed by spring 1291, and around £2,000 was raised. Twenty thousand pounds' worth of debts were seized, but barely anything was collected. The reasons for this are unclear, but could include an attempt to win political favour by providing benefit to those previously indebted.

Between the expulsion of the Jews in 1290 and their informal return in 1655 there is no official trace of Jews as such on English soil except in connection with the Domus Conversorum, which kept a number of them within its precincts up to 1551 and even later.

== Attitudes to the Jewry after 1290 ==
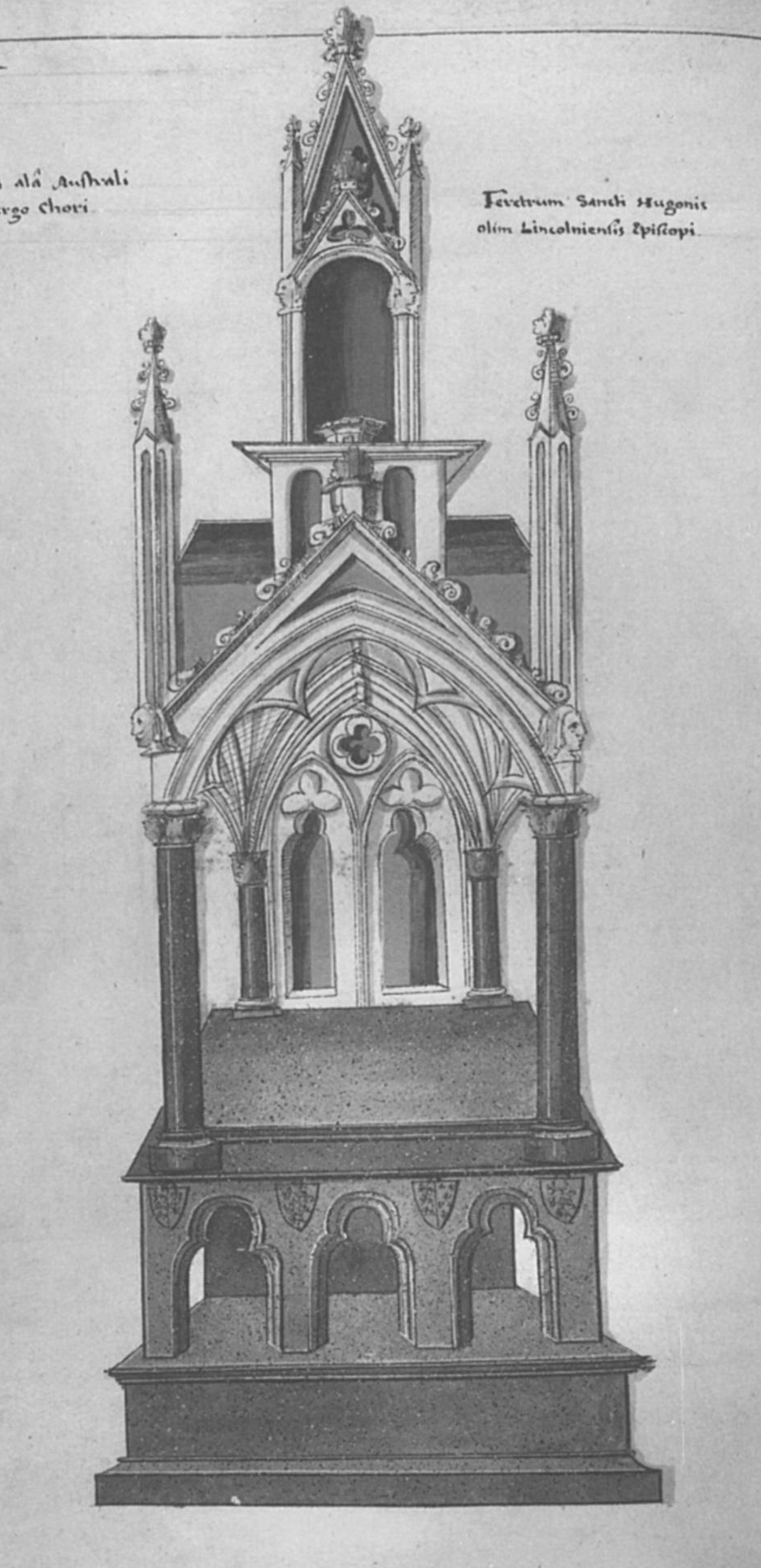
The Shrine of Little St Hugh, whose death was falsely attributed to the Jews of Lincoln, redesigned by Edward I's craftsmen after 1290

Edward I continued to use the expulsion of the Jewry as a political tool after 1290. He took care to ensure that he was seen as a protector of Christendom from the criminality of Jews, for instance by sponsoring the cult of Little Saint Hugh of Lincoln, a child whose supposed murder and crucifixion by Jews had led to popular veneration. His own craftsmen rebuilt the shrine in the same style as the Eleanor crosses, and included memorialisation of Queen Eleanor and the Royal coat of arms; by which a "more explicit identification of the crown with the ritual crucifixion charge can hardly be imagined." Hillaby believes that the Eleanor crosses and renovated shrine played a critical role in disseminating the Little St Hugh myth.

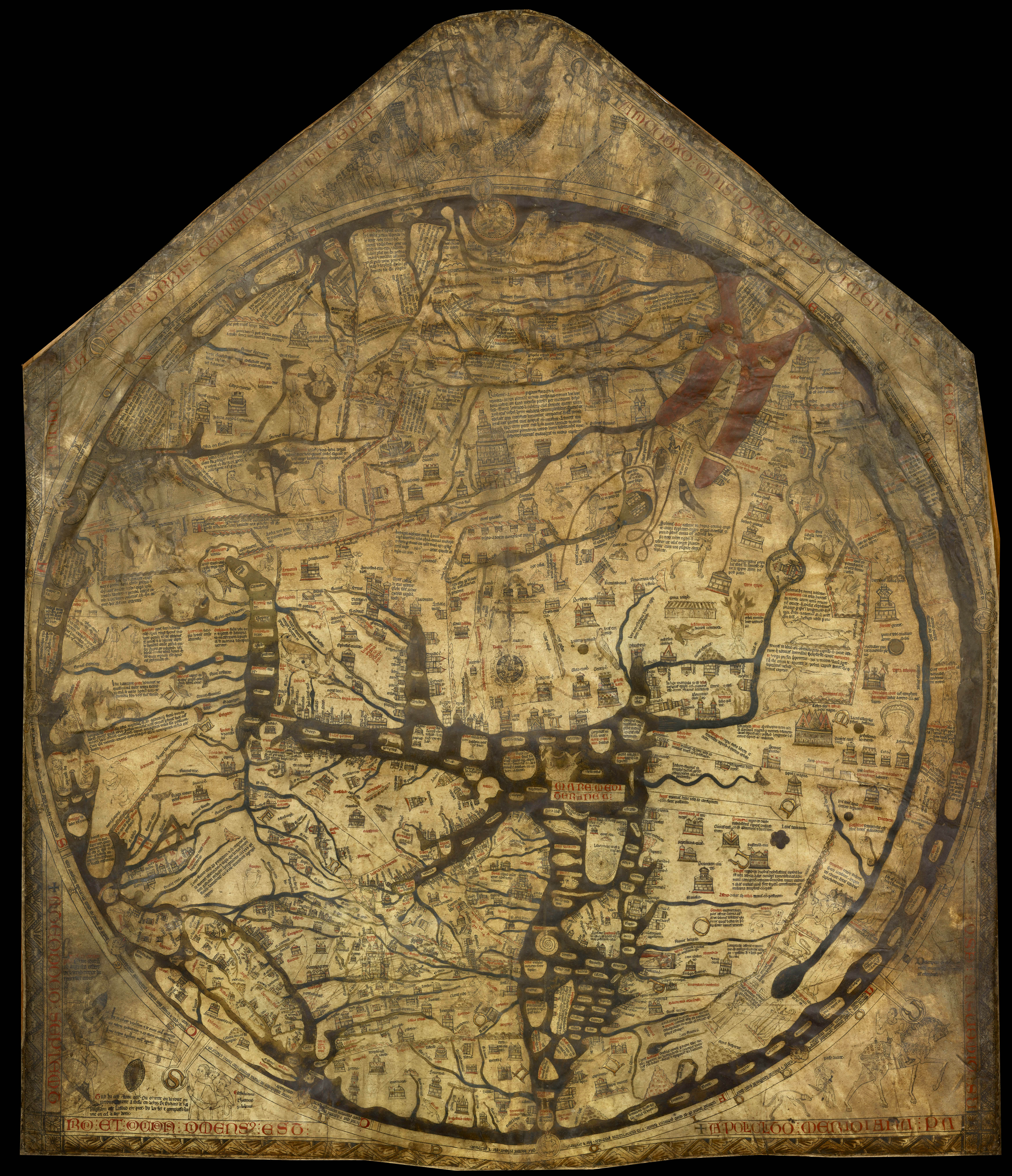
The Hereford Mappa Mundi features a depiction of the Exodus of the Jews from Egypt, which draws parallels with the expulsion of the Jews from England.

The promotion of the cult of the former Bishop of Hereford Thomas de Cantilupe by Swinefield and Edward I also appears to have played a role in propagandising antisemitic values well beyond the expulsion, including within the Hereford Mappa Mundi.

Longer term, it is often believed that English identity after the Expulsion held a strong strand of antisemitism, developing negative ideas of what Jews were, and what dangers they posed. Images of Jews are "rife" in devotional literature of the late Middle Ages including sermons and plays. Cohen writes that:

the fourteenth and fifteenth centuries saw the proliferation of the Host-desecration story in England: in collections of miracle stories, many of them dedicated to the miracles of the Virgin Mary; in the art of illuminated manuscripts used for Christian prayer and meditation; and on stage, as in popular Croxton Play of the Sacrament, which itself evoked memories of an alleged ritual murder committed by Jews in East Anglia in 1191.

Depictions of Jews and antisemitic themes can also be found in literature from Chaucer through to Shakespeare's time and beyond, albeit softened in comparison with the thirteenth century. Before the readmission of Jews, the idea that England was unique in part because it was free of Jews appears to have developed, feeding into an idea that English identity excluded Jewishness: "between 1290 and 1656 the English came to see their country defined in part by the fact that Jews had been banished from it."

== See also ==
- History of the Jews in England
- Edict of Expulsion
- History of the Marranos in England
- Resettlement of the Jews in England
  - Menasseh Ben Israel
- Jewish Naturalization Act 1753
- Influences on the standing of the Jews in England
- Emancipation of the Jews in England
- Early English Jewish literature
- History of the Jews in Scotland
- Aaron, Son of the Devil, an antisemitic caricature dated 1277

== Sources ==
=== Secondary sources ===
- Abrams, Rebecca (2022). Licoricia of Winchester: Power and Prejudice in Medieval England (1st ed.). Winchester: The Licoricia of Winchester Appeal. pp. 61–62. ISBN 978-1-3999-1638-7.
- Abulafia, Anna Sapir (16 October 2014). "William of Newburgh on the attack on the Jews of York in 1190". Jewish/non-Jewish Relations.
- BBC, ed. (2009). "York pogrom, 1190". BBC.
- Butler, Lawrence. (1997). Clifford's Tower and the Castles of York. London: English Heritage. ISBN 1-85074-673-7.
- Chazan, Robert (2006). The Jews of Medieval Western Christendom, 1000–1500. Cambridge: Cambridge University Press. p. 159. ISBN 978-0-521-84666-0.
- Cohen, Jeremy (2007). Christ Killers: the Jews and the Passion from the Bible to the Big Screen. Oxford: Oxford University Press. p. 103. ISBN 978-0-19-517841-8.
- Despres, Denise (1998). "Immaculate Flesh and the Social Body: Mary and the Jews". Jewish History. 12: 47. doi:10.1007/BF02335453.
- Dickerson, David. "Clifford's Tower - Massacre at York (1190)". David Dickerson's Web Site. Archived from the original on 19 September 2008.
- Dobson, R. B. (1974). The Jews of Medieval York and the Massacre of March 1190. York: St. Anthony's Press.
- —— (1974). "The Decline and Expulsion of the Medieval Jews of York". Transactions & Miscellanies (Jewish Historical Society of England). 26: 34–52. JSTOR 29778866.
- —— (1990). "The Jews of medieval Cambridge". Jewish Historical Studies. 32: 1–24. JSTOR 29779882.
- Glassman, Bernard (1975). Antisemitic Stereotypes Without Jews: Images of the Jews 1290-1700. Detroit: Wayne State University Press. ISBN 978-0814315453.
- Graetz, Heinrich Hirsch (1902). History of the Jews. Vol. 3. Philadelphia: The Jewish Publication Society of America. pp. 409–16.
- Graetz, Heinrich (1891), History of the Jews, Philadelphia: Jewish Publication Society of America, LCCN 04022901, OCLC 890591, OL 6944479M
- Harris, Oliver D. (2008). "Jews, jurats and the Jewry Wall: a name in context" (PDF). Transactions of the Leicestershire Archaeological and Historical Society. 82: 113–33.
- Hillaby, Joe (1990). "The Hereford Jewry, 1179-1290 (third and final part) Aaron le Blund and the Last Decades of the Hereford Jewry, 1253-90". Transactions of the Woolhope Naturalists' Field Club. XLVI (III): 432–487.
- —— (1994). "The Ritual-Child-Murder Accusation: Its Dissemination and Harold of Gloucester". Jewish Historical Studies. 34: 69–109. JSTOR 29779954.
- Hillaby, Joe (2003). "Jewish Colonisation in the Twelfth Century". In Skinner, Patricia (ed.). Jews in Medieval Britain. Woodbridge: Boydell Press. pp. 15–40. ISBN 978-1-84383-733-6.
- Hillaby, Joe; Hillaby, Caroline (2013). The Palgrave Dictionary of Medieval Anglo-Jewish History. Basingstoke: Palgrave Macmillan. ISBN 978-0-23027-816-5.
- Huscroft, Richard (2006). Expulsion: England's Jewish solution. Stroud: Tempus. ISBN 978-0-752-43729-3. OL 7982808M.
- Hyams, Paul (1974). "The Jewish Minority in Medieval England, 1066-1290". Journal of Jewish Studies. xxv (2): 270–293. doi:10.18647/682/JJS-1974.
- Jacobs, Joseph (1903). "England". In Singer, Isidore; et al. (eds.). The Jewish Encyclopedia. Vol. 5. New York: Funk & Wagnalls. p. 161-174.
- Richardson, Henry (1960). English Jewry under Angevin Kings. London: Methuen. OL 17927110M.
- Jobson, Adrian (2012). The First English Revolution: Simon de Montfort, Henry III and the Barons' War. London, UK: Bloomsbury. ISBN 978-1-84725-226-5.
- Jones, Dan (2012). The Plantagenets: The Kings Who Made England. HarperCollins. ISBN 978-0-00-745749-6.
- Maddicott, John Robert (1996). Simon De Montfort. Cambridge: Cambridge University Press. ISBN 0-521-37493-6.
- Maier, Christoph T. (2022), "Crusaders and Jews: The York Massacre of 1190 Revisited", in Church, Stephen D. (ed.), Anglo-Norman Studies XLIV: Proceedings of the Battle Conference 2021, Boydell & Brewer, pp. 105–120, ISBN 978-1-80010-631-4
- Morris, Marc (2009). A Great and Terrible King: Edward I and the Forging of Britain. London: Windmill Books. ISBN 978-0-0994-8175-1.
- Mundill, Robin R. (2003). "Edward I and the Final Phase of Anglo-Jewry". In Skinner, Patricia (ed.). Jews in Medieval Britain. Woodbridge: Boydell Press. pp. 55–70. ISBN 978-1-84383-733-6.
- Mundill, Robin R. (2002), England's Jewish Solution, Cambridge: Cambridge University Press, ISBN 978-0-521-52026-3, OL 26454030M
- Mundill, Robin R. (2010), The King's Jews, London: Continuum, ISBN 9781847251862, LCCN 2010282921, OCLC 466343661, OL 24816680M
- Prestwich, Michael (1997). Edward I. English Monarchs. Yale University Press. ISBN 978-0-3000-7209-9. OL 704063M.
- Poole, Austin L. (1955). Domesday Book to Magna Carta. The Oxford History of England (Second ed.). Oxford: Oxford University Press. ISBN 0198217072.
- Richmond, Colin (1992). "Englishness and Medieval Anglo-Jewry". In Kushner, Tony (ed.). The Jewish Heritage in British History. Frank Cass. pp. 42–59. ISBN 0-7146-3464-6.
- Rokéah, Zefira Entin (1988). "Money and the hangman in late thirteenth century England: Jews, Christians and coinage offences alleged and real (Part I)". Jewish Historical Studies. 31: 83–109. JSTOR 29779864.
- Rokéah, Zefira Entin (1990). "Money and the hangman in late thirteenth century England: Jews, Christians and coinage offences alleged and real (Part II)". Jewish Historical Studies. 32: 159–218. JSTOR 29779885.
- Roth, Cecil (1964). A history of the Jews in England (Third ed.). Oxford: Clarendon Press. ISBN 978-0198224884.
- Schama, Simon (2013). "Simon Schama". The Story of the Jews: Finding the Words, 1000BCE – 1492CE. London: Bodley Head. ISBN 978-1847921321. OL 20348455W.
- Scheil, Andrew P. (2004). The Footsteps of Israel: understanding Jews in Anglo-Saxon England. Ann Arbor: University of Michigan Press. ISBN 978-0-472-11408-5.
- Shapiro, James (1996). Shakespeare and the Jews (Twentieth Anniversary ed.). Chichester, West Sussex: Columbia University Press. ISBN 978-0-231-17867-9.
- Skinner, Patricia (2003). "Introduction". In Skinner, Patricia (ed.). Jews in Medieval Britain. Woodbridge: Boydell Press. pp. 1–11. ISBN 0851159311.
- Stacey, Robert C. (1988). "1240-60: A Watershed in Anglo-Jewish Relations?". Historical Research. 61 (145): 135–50. doi:10.1111/j.1468-2281.1988.tb01056.x.
- —— (1997). "Parliamentary Negotiation and the Expulsion of the Jews from England". In Prestwich, Michael; Britnell, Richard H.; Frame, Robin (eds.). Thirteenth Century England: Proceedings of the Durham Conference, 1995. Vol. 6. Woodbridge: Boydell Press. pp. 77–102. ISBN 978-0-85115-674-3.
- —— (2001). "Anti-Semitism and the Medieval English State". In Maddicott, J. R.; Pallister, D. M. (eds.). The Medieval State: Essays Presented to James Campbell. London: The Hambledon Press. pp. 163–77.
- —— (2003). "The English Jews Under Henry III: Historical, Literary and Archaeological Perspectives". In Skinner, Patricia (ed.). Jews in Medieval Britain. Woodbridge, UK: Boydell Press. pp. 41–54. ISBN 978-1-84383-733-6.
- —— (2011). "Review of The King's Jews: Money, Massacre and Exodus in Medieval England, (review no. 1077)". Reviews in History.
- —— (2013). "King Henry III and the Jews". In Utterback, Kristine T.; Price, Merrall L. (eds.). Jews in Medieval Christendom: 'Slay Them Not'. Leiden: Brill. pp. 117–127.
- Strickland, Debra Higgs (2018). "Edward I, Exodus, and England on the Hereford World Map" (PDF). Speculum. 93 (2): 420–69. doi:10.1086/696540.
- Tomasch, Sylvia (2002), "Postcolonial Chaucer and the Virtual Jew", in Delany, Sheila (ed.), Chaucer and the Jews, Routledge, pp. 43–58, ISBN 9780415938822, OL 7496826M
- Taylor, Alison (1999). Cambridge, the hidden history. Tempus. ISBN 0752414364.
- Tolan, John (2023). England's Jews: Finance, Violence, and the Crown in the Thirteenth Century. Philadelphia: University of Pennsylvania Press. ISBN 978-1512823899. OL 39646815M.
- Lee, Sidney (1899). "Tovey, De Blossiers" . Dictionary of National Biography. Vol. 57. pp. 89–90.
- Vincent, Nicholas (1994). "Two Papal Letters on the Wearing of the Jewish Badge, 1221 and 1229". Jewish Historical Studies. 34: 209–24. JSTOR 29779960.
- York 1190: Jews and Others in the Wake of Massacre. University of York - Centre for Medieval Studies. March 2010. Archived from the original on 17 January 2012.
- York Museums Trust, ed. (2015). "The 1190 Massacre". History Of York. York Museums Trust.

=== Primary sources ===
- Ephraim of Bonn (1190). "The York Massacre, as Described by Ephraim of Bonn". Jewish Virtual Library.
- Gervase of Canterbury (1879). Stubbs, William (ed.). The Chronicle of the Reigns of Stephen, Henry II, and Richard I. London: Longman. p. 205.
- Halsall, Paul (1999). "Gilbert Crispin: Disputation of a Jew with a Christian about the Christian Faith (Before 1096)". Medieval Sourcebook. Fordham University.
- Roger of Hoveden (1189). "The Persecution of Jews, 1189". Medieval Sourcebook. Fordham University.
- Rokéah, Zefira Entin, ed. (2000). Medieval English Jews and Royal Officials: Entries of Jewish Interest in the English Memoranda Rolls, 1266–1293. Jerusalem: The Hebrew University Magnes Press.
- Stubbs, W. W., ed. (1883). "Commendatio lamentabilis in transitu magni regis Edwardi". Chronicles of the Reigns of Edward I and Edward II. Rolls Series 76 (in Latin). Vol. 2. London. pp. 3–21.
