= Yom Tov of Joigny =

French-born rabbi, victim of the 1190 York pogrom

Yom Tov (alt. Yom Tob) of Joigny, also denoted of York (died 1190) was a French-born rabbi and liturgical poet of the medieval era who lived in York, and died in the massacre of the Jews of York in 1190. A Hebrew language hymn attributed to him, transliterated "Omnam Kayn" or "Omnam Ken" (Heb: "indeed thus") is still recited in Eastern Ashkenazi synagogues each year on the evening of Yom Kippur, the Day of Atonement. He was a student of Rabbeinu Tam.

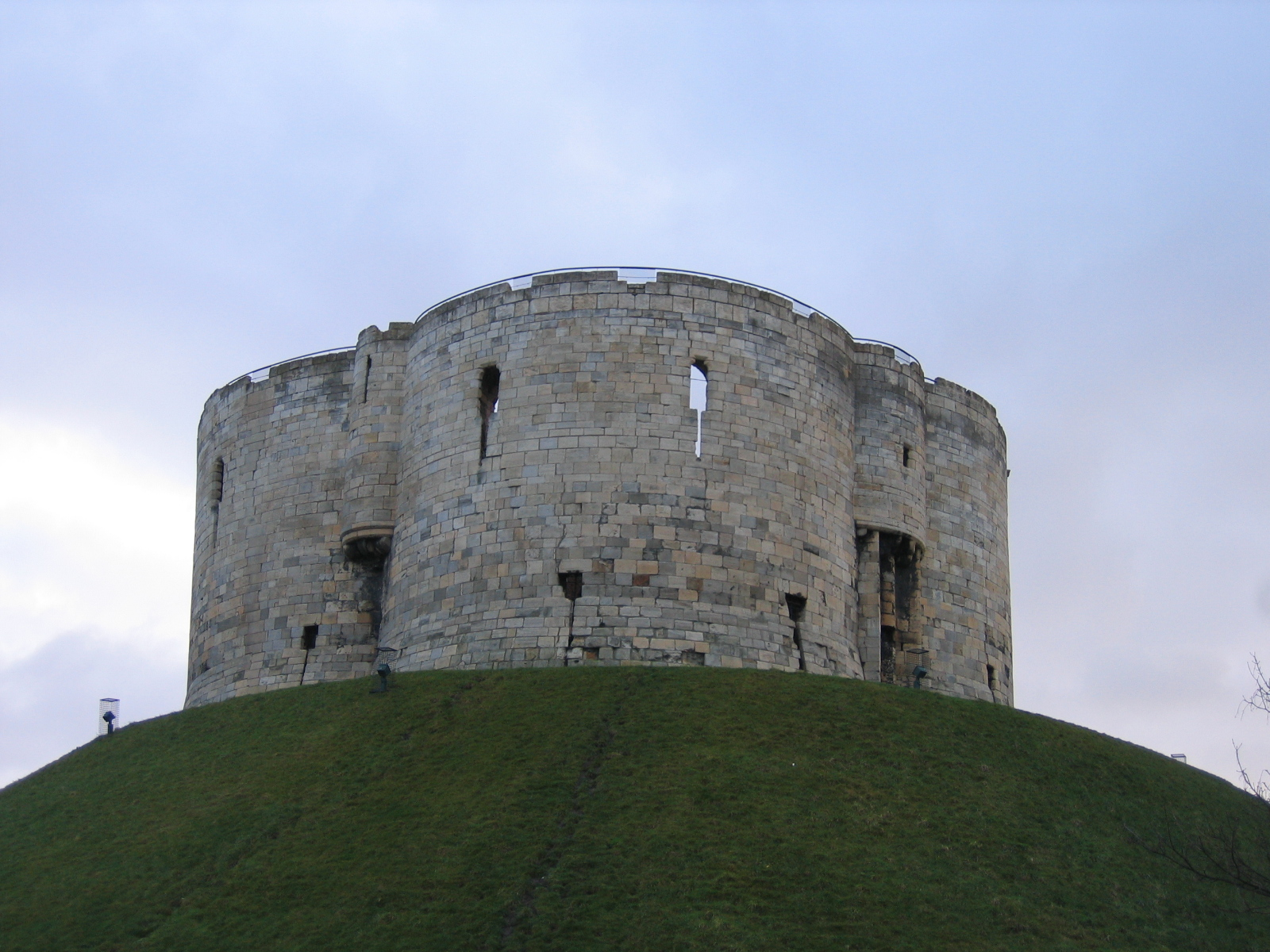
Clifford's Tower, where the Rabbi Yom Tob and the Jews of York were killed in 1190.

== Pogrom ==
He died at York Castle on 17 March 1190. The incident was provoked by Richard de Malbis (Richard Malebisse), who was in considerable debt to Aaron of Lincoln. When a fire accidentally broke out in the city on 16 March 1190, de Malbis used the opportunity to incite a mob to attack the home of Benedict of York, the recently deceased agent of Aaron of Lincoln, killing his widow and children and burning the house.

The following evening, (the day of the Jewish feast of Shabbat HaGadol, the shabbat before Passover), Josce of York (Joseph), the leader of the Jewish community of York, gained permission from the constable of York Castle to bring his wife and children, Rabbi Yom Tov and the rest of the Jews into the castle. The group, numbering about 150, then took refuge in the castle's motte that had a wooden tower, but the motte was besieged by the mob demanding that the Jews be baptized and convert to Christianity.

With no hope of escape, Rabbi Yom Tov advised the other Jews to kill themselves rather than convert. Josce began by slaying his wife Anna and two children. He was then killed by Yom Tov. The father of each family killed his wife and children and then Yom Tov stabbed the men before killing himself. The tower was set alight so their bodies could not be mutilated by the mob.

A handful of Jews who did not kill themselves surrendered at daybreak on 17 March, leaving the castle on a promise that they would not be harmed, but they were all killed by the mob.

The pogrom was part of a series of massacres against other Jewish communities in England over the preceding weeks. It was in the wake of religious fervor created from preparations for the Third Crusade led by Richard I against the Saracens.

== See also ==
- History of the Jews in England
