= Hagin Deulacres =

13th-century English rabbi

Hagin fil Deulacres (Hebrew: חַיִּים בֵּן גְּדַלְיָה דֵּילַקְרִיס, Ḥayyim Gedalyah Deulacres) (Note: Also written Deulecresse and Dieulacresse. In Hebrew also די לקריס, דון לקריס, לכריס, לקריש, לכריש, די(י)לקרש, and דלכריש. From 'Deus eum crescat', the translation of the Hebrew name Gedalyahu.) was a 13th-century rabbi who served as the last Presbyter Judaeorum of England prior to the Edict of Expulsion of 1290. A Jew from London, Hagin was appointed to the position on 15 May 1281, through the intercession of Queen Eleanor of Provence. He is not mentioned among the Jewish deportees, and is therefore presumed to have died before the Expulsion.

According to Adolf Neubauer, Hagin may have translated into French Abraham ibn Ezra's astrological work Reshit ḥokhma ('The Beginning of Wisdom') in 1273, as well as the Image du monde of Gautier de Metz.
