= Aaron of York =

Jewish financier and chief rabbi of England

Autograph of Aaron of York

Aaron of York or Aaron fil Josce, was a Jewish financier and chief rabbi of England. He was born in York before 1190 and died after 1253. He was probably the son of Josce of York, the leading figure in the York pogrom of 1190.

== Chief Rabbi ==
Aaron appears to have obtained some of his father's money and commercial connection, for he was appointed Presbyter Judaeorum, or senior representative, of the Jews of England in 1237, in succession to Josce of London. This would imply that he was very wealthy, as only the wealthiest of the Jews obtained this position. He did not hold the office more than a year, as he was succeeded in 1237 by Elias of London (Prynne, Short Demurrer, ii.38).

== Transactions ==
In 1219 he was appointed by the King to act as a talliator (assessor of tallage) and was among the twelve wealthiest Jews of the Kingdom.

In 1221 on the marriage of the King's sister to Alexander II of Scotland, Aaron paid £14 15s towards her dowry.

In 1223 he paid £43 towards a tallage of £3000, making the second highest payment.

In 1235 Henry III had made an agreement with him that he would only tax him 100 marks, reduced to 60. This was never honoured.

In 1236 Aaron agreed to pay to King Henry III of England 100 marks a year to be free of all taxes (Tovey, Anglia Judaica, Oxford, 1738, p. 108). Notwithstanding this, in 1273 he was mulcted 4,000 marks of silver and four of gold (Matthew Paris, Chronica Majora, iv.260). This was not an unusual occurrence, for in 1250 he was fined 14,000 marks of silver and ten of gold for the use of the Queen, on the charge of having falsified a deed. On this occasion he told Matthew Paris himself that he had paid the king altogether no less a sum than 30,000 marks in silver and 200 in gold (ibid. v.136). A number of Hebrew sheṭarot dealing with Aaron's transactions still exist, one of them entirely in his own handwriting.

When Henry III went to war in 1243, in his absence Aaron of York was accused of transgressions against the King; these are not recorded. He was sent to prison and managed to leave when he paid a fine of £100. The following year he was accused of forging a deed and was summoned before the King. On threat of imprisonment he paid the sum of 30,000 marks in silver to the King and 200 gold marks as a gift to the Queen. At this time the King was desperate for money as the war in France had not gone well. This left Aaron of York in ruins and the King realised that he was no more of use to him and dismissed him from his office.
