= Josce of London =

13th-century Jewish leader in England

Josce of London was an English Jew and the Presbyter Judaeorum, or Chief Rabbi, of the Jews of England from 1217 to 1237.

Josce succeeded Jacob of London as Chief Rabbi on his death in 1217. This would imply that Josce was very wealthy, as only the wealthiest of the Jews obtained this position. In 1237 Josce was succeeded by Aaron of York, the Jewish financier and probable son of Josce of York.

He may have been that Josce of London who was the founder of Collège des Dix-Huit, the earliest college of the University of Paris in 1180. However, this identification is highly questionable given that the college's founder is described as mandating Christian ritual observance at the college.
