= Hagin ben Moses =

English Rabbi

Hagin ben Moses or Hagin filus Mossy (Hebrew: חיים בן משה, romanized: Ḥayyim ben Mosše) was Presbyter Judaeorum or Chief Rabbi of the Jews of England and agent of Richard of Cornwall, who was King of the Romans. He appears to have been the chirographer of the Jews of London and obtained great wealth, but he lost it under Edward Longshanks, King of England.

In 1255, Hagin was appointed Presbyter on the expulsion of Elias of London from that office. It seems probable that he was a brother of Elias. During the riots preceding the Battle of Lewes on 14 May 1264, he fled to Europe. His wife, Antera, and his son, Aaron, seem to have held possession of the only remaining synagogue in London at the time of the Edict of Expulsion in 1290.
