= Jacob of London =

Presbyter Judaeorum of the Jews of England (died 1217)

Jacob of London was the first known Presbyter Judaeorum of the Jews of England; appointed to that position by King John in 1199, who also gave him a safe-conduct. He appears to have died in 1217, when Josce of London is mentioned as his successor. He is possibly identical with the rabbi Jacob of London who translated the whole Haggadah into the vernacular so that women and children could understand it (Isserles, "Darke Mosheh," to Tur Orah Hayyim, 473).

== Resources ==
- Jacobs, Joseph. "Jacob of London." Jewish Encyclopedia. Funk and Wagnalls, 1901–1906, which gives the following bibliography:

- Prynne, Short Demurrer, ii. 3-5;
- H. Adler, in Papers of the Anglo-Jewish Historical Exhibition, pp. 262-263.
