= Presbyter Judaeorum =

Defunct mediaeval English office

The Presbyter Judaeorum was the chief official of the Jews of England prior to the Edict of Expulsion. The office appears to have been for life, though in two or three instances the incumbent either resigned or was dismissed. Prynne argues that the Presbyter Judaeorum was merely a secular officer in the Exchequer of the Jews to keep the rolls of control, whereas Tovey argues that the use of "sacerdos" and "pontifex" as synonymous of the office shows its ecclesiastical character.

There were only six of them between 1199 and 1290, the first known being Jacob of London, appointed in 1199; the next were Josce of London (1217–1237), Aaron of York (1237), Elias le Evesque (1237), Hagin fil Mosse (1257), and Hagin fil Deulacres (1281; appointed by the favour of Eleanor of Provence).

In the grant of Elias le Evesque, the justices of the Jews were ordered not to issue any summons without the confirmation of the said Elias, from which it appears that the presbyter acted somewhat as a baron of the Jewish Exchequer; and it was distinctly stated that Hagin fil Mosse had been sworn into the Jewish Exchequer to look after the administration of justice on behalf of the king and to explain the king's laws. It is thus probable that the presbyter was a successor of the Jewish justices, of whom two are mentioned toward the end of the twelfth century.
