= Josce of York =

12th century Jewish community leader in York, England, victim of the 1190 pogrom

Josce of York (Latin: Joceus; died 1190) was the leader of the Jewish community in York, England, and the leading figure in the York pogrom of 1190. He committed suicide along with nearly the entire Jewish community, rather than face death or conversion at the hands of an angry mob.

== Biography ==
Josce is mentioned in the earliest surviving English shetar (receipt for debt repayment), of 1176. He was one of those who attended the coronation of Richard I, doubtless as the representative of the York congregation, and escaped the London massacre. On his return to York, where he had a house which rivaled a citadel in the scale and magnificence of its construction, he was attacked by the mob, and with his wife and children joined other fugitives who sought refuge in Clifford's Tower. When the decision was reached to put one another to death rather than fall into the hands of the enemy, Josce was the first to act, slaying his wife, Anna, and his children; he himself was slain last by Yom-Tov of Joigny.

It is likely that the noted Aaron of York or Aaron fil Josce, the financier and chief rabbi of England was Josce's son.

It is probable that Josce and Samuel Hoppecole held the land in London on which the chief synagogue was built.
