= York Castle =

Grade I listed monument in York, England

- Yorkshire, England
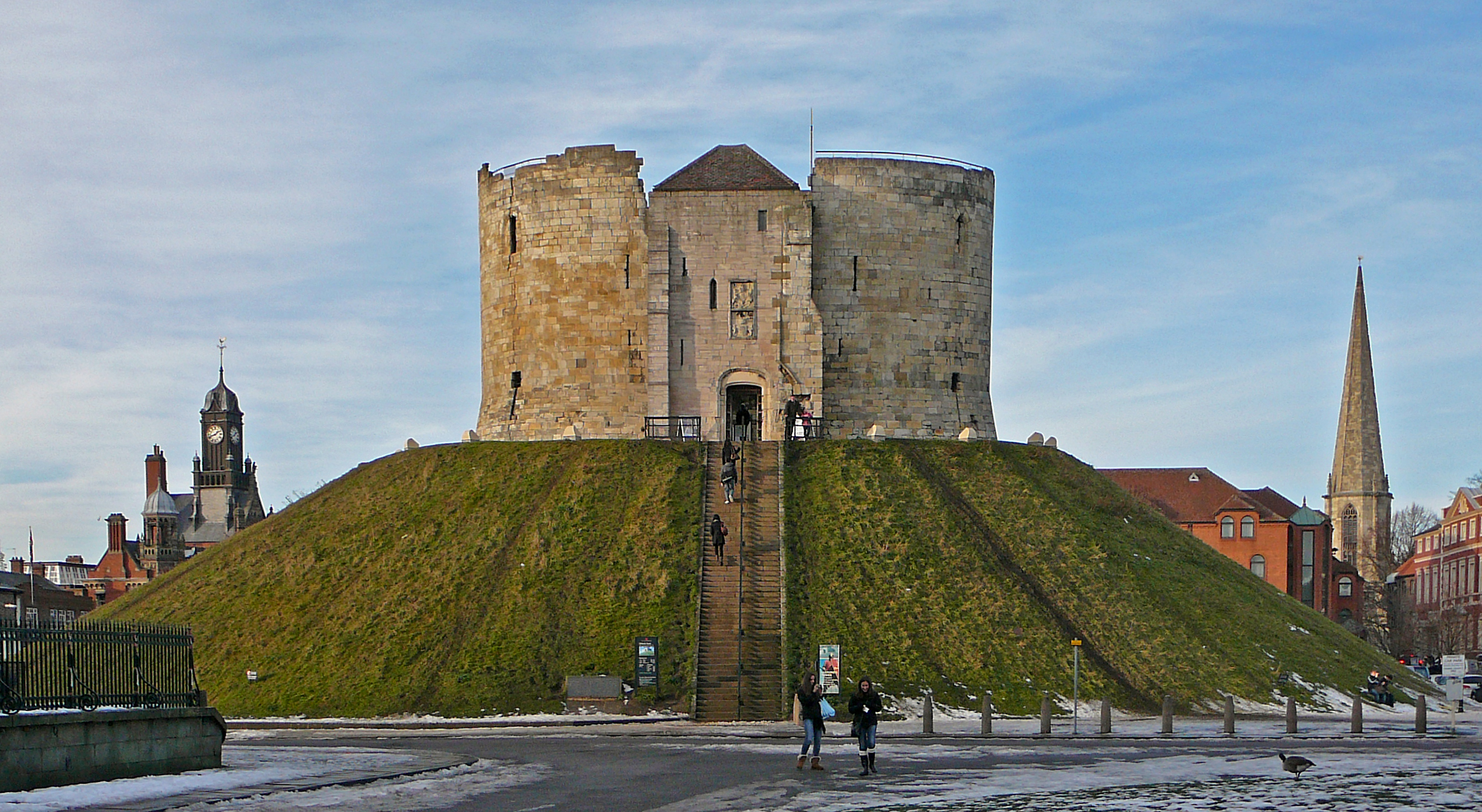
- Clifford's Tower, the keep of York Castle

Site information
- Type: Shell keep and bailey
- Owner: English Heritage, York Museums Trust, Her Majesty's Courts Service
- Condition: Ruined keep, restored part curtain-wall, surviving 18th century buildings used as a museum and York's Crown Court

Location
- Shown within North Yorkshire
- Coordinates: 53°57′21″N 01°04′48″W
- Grid reference: grid reference SE603514

Site history
- Materials: Magnesian Limestone
- Battles/wars: Siege of York in 1644
- Events: Jewish massacre of 1190

Listed Building – Grade I
- Designated: 14 June 1954
- Reference no.: 1259325; 1259360; 1259324; 1259328; 1259329

York Castle is a fortified complex in the city of York, England. It consists of a sequence of castles, prisons, law courts and other buildings, which were built over the last nine centuries on the north-west side of the River Foss. The now ruined keep of the medieval Norman castle is commonly referred to as Clifford's Tower. Built originally on the orders of William the Conqueror to dominate the former Viking city of Jórvík, the castle suffered a tumultuous early history before developing into a major fortification with extensive water defences. After a major explosion in 1684 rendered the remaining military defences uninhabitable, York Castle continued to be used as a jail and prison until 1929.

The first motte and bailey castle on the site was built in 1068 following the Norman conquest of York. After the destruction of the castle by rebels and a Viking army in 1069, York Castle was rebuilt and reinforced with extensive water defences, including a moat and an artificial lake. York Castle formed an important royal fortification in the north of England. In 1190, 150 local Jews died in the timber castle keep; most of them committed suicide in order not to fall into the hands of the mob. In the middle of the 13th century, Henry III rebuilt the castle in stone creating a keep with a unique quatrefoil design, supported by an outer bailey wall and a substantial gatehouse. During the Scottish wars between 1298 and 1338, York Castle was frequently used as the centre of royal administration across England, as well as an important military base of operations. York Castle fell into disrepair by the 15th and 16th centuries, becoming used increasingly as a jail for both local felons and political prisoners. By the time of Elizabeth I the castle was estimated to have lost all of its military value but was maintained as a centre of royal authority in York.

The outbreak of the English Civil War in 1642 saw York Castle being repaired and refortified, playing a part in the Royalist defence of York in 1644 against Parliamentary forces. York Castle continued to be garrisoned until 1684, when an explosion destroyed the interior of Clifford's Tower. The castle bailey was redeveloped in a neoclassical style in the 18th century as a centre for county administration in Yorkshire, and was used as a jail and debtors' prison. Prison reform in the 19th century led to the creation of a new prison built in a Tudor Gothic style on the castle site in 1825; used first as a county and then as a military prison, this facility was demolished in 1935. By the 20th century the ruin of Clifford's Tower had become a well-known tourist destination and national monument; today the site is owned by English Heritage and open to the public. The other remaining buildings serve as the York Castle Museum and the Crown Court.

== History ==
=== 11th century ===
Location of York Castle (8) and the major features of York city walls (1: Bootham Bar, 2: Monk Bar, 3: Walmgate Bar, 4: Micklegate Bar, 5: Fishergate Bar, 6: Victoria Bar, 7: Multiangular Tower).

York was a Viking capital in the 10th century, and continued as an important northern city in the 11th century. In 1068, on William the Conqueror's first northern expedition after the Norman Conquest, he built a number of castles across the north-east of England, including one at York. This first castle at York was a basic wooden motte and bailey castle built between the rivers Ouse and Foss on the site of the present-day York Castle. It was built in haste; contemporary accounts imply it was constructed in only eight days, although this assertion has been challenged. The motte was originally around 200 ft (61 m) wide at the base. As it was built in an urban environment, hundreds of houses had to be destroyed to make way for the development. William Malet, the sheriff of Yorkshire, was placed in charge of the castle and successfully defended it against an immediate uprising by the local population.

In response to the worsening security situation, William conducted his second northern campaign in 1069. He built another castle in York, on what is now Baile Hill on the west bank of the Ouse opposite the first castle, in an effort to improve his control over the city. This second castle was also a motte and bailey design, with the Baile Hill motte probably reached by a horizontal bridge and steps cut up the side of the motte. Later that year, a Danish Viking fleet sailed up to York along the Humber and the Ouse, and attacked both castles with the assistance of Cospatrick of Northumbria and a number of local rebels. The Normans, attempting to drive the rebels back, set fire to some of the city's houses. The fire grew out of control and also set fire to York Minster and, some argue, the castles as well. (Note: Hull (p.98) and others draw on documentary evidence which state that the castles were first burnt, then partially dismantled.Cooper (1911) disagrees, drawing on archaeological work that shows no evidence of fire having damaged the relevant layers of the mottes.) The castles were captured and partially dismantled, and Malet was taken hostage by the Danes.

William conducted a widespread sequence of punitive operations across the north of England in the aftermath of the attacks in 1069 and 1070. This "Harrying of the North" restored sufficient order to allow the rebuilding of the two castles, again in wood. The bailey at York Castle was enlarged slightly in the process; buildings believed to have been inside the bailey at this time include "halls, kitchens, a chapel, barracks, stores, stables, forges [and] workshops". By the time the Domesday Book was compiled in 1086, York Castle was also surrounded by a water-filled moat and a large artificial lake called the King's Pool, fed from the river Foss by a dam built for the purpose. More property, including two watermills, had to be destroyed to make way for the water defences. Over time the Baile Hill site was abandoned in favour of the first castle site, leaving only the motte, which still exists.

=== 12th century ===
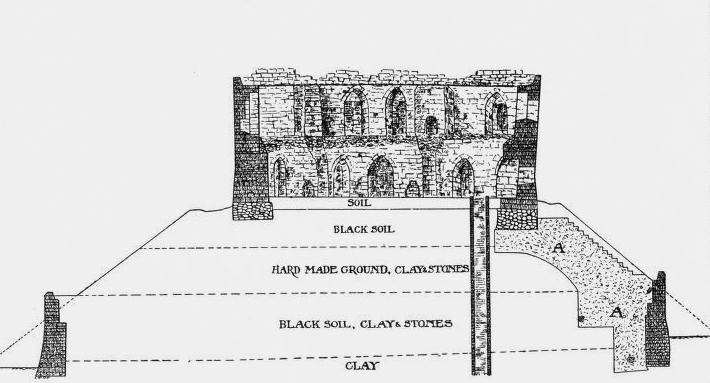
A cross-section of the motte at York Castle, produced in 1903 by Sir Basil Mott; "A" marks the 20th-century concrete underpinnings of the motte; the low walls enclosing the base of the motte are a 19th-century addition

Henry II visited York Castle four times during his reign. The royal chambers at the time were inside the keep for safety, and Henry paid £15 for repairs to the keep. (Note: Comparison of medieval financial figures with modern equivalents is notoriously challenging. For comparison, the majority of the barons of the period would have an annual income from their lands of less than £100.) During his 1175 visit, Henry used the castle as the base for receiving the homage of William the Lion of Scotland.Castle mills were built close by to support the garrison, and the military order of the Knights Templar was granted ownership of the mills in the mid-12th century. The mills proved to be vulnerable to the flooding of the two rivers and had to be repeatedly repaired.

==== Massacre of Jews ====
External audio
- The Medieval Massacre of the Jews of York, Speaking with Shadows, published by English Heritage, retrieved 6 April 2021

In 1190, York Castle was the location of one of the worst pogroms in England during the medieval period. The Normans had introduced the first Jewish communities into England, where some occupied a special economic role as moneylenders, an essential but otherwise banned activity. English Jews were subject to considerable religious prejudice and primarily worked from towns and cities in which there was a local royal castle that could provide them with protection in the event of attacks from the majority Christian population. Royal protection was usually granted as the Norman and Angevin kings had determined that Jewish property and debts owed to Jews ultimately belonged to the crown, reverting to the king on a Jew's death.

Richard I was crowned king in 1189 and announced his intention to join the Crusades; this inflamed anti-Jewish sentiment. Rumours began to spread that the king had ordered that the English Jews be attacked. In York, tensions broke out into violence the following year. Richard de Malbis, who owed money to the powerful Jewish merchant Aaron of Lincoln, exploited an accidental house fire to incite a local mob to attack the home and family of a recently deceased Jewish employee of Aaron in York. Josce of York, the leader of the Jewish community, led the local Jewish families into the royal castle, where they took refuge in the wooden keep. The mob surrounded the castle, and when the constable left the castle to discuss the situation, the Jews, fearing the entry of the mob or being handed over to the sheriff, refused to allow him back in. The constable appealed to the sheriff, who called out his own men and laid siege to the keep. The siege continued until 16 March when the Jews' position became untenable. Their religious leader, Rabbi Yomtob, proposed an act of collective suicide to avoid being killed by the mob, and the castle was set on fire to prevent their bodies being mutilated after their deaths. Several Jews perished in the flames but the majority took their own lives rather than give themselves up to the mob. However, a handful of Jews did surrender, promising to convert to Christianity, but they were killed by the angry crowd. Around 150 Jews died in total in the massacre. The keep was rebuilt, again in wood, on the motte, which was raised in height by 13 ft (4.0 m) at a cost of £207. (Note: Comparison of medieval financial figures with modern equivalents is notoriously challenging. For comparison, £207 is slightly more than the £200 a year average income of a baron during this period.)

=== 13th century ===
King John used York Castle extensively during his reign, using the keep as his personal quarters, for security. The castle was kept in good repair during that time. During this period, the first records of the use of the castle as a jail appear, with references to prisoners of John's Irish campaigns being held there. By the 13th century there was a well-established system of castle-guards in place, under which lands around York were granted in return for knights and crossbowmen to assist in protecting the castle.

Henry III also made extensive use of the castle, but during his visit at Christmas 1228 a gale destroyed the wooden keep on the motte. The keep was apparently not repaired, and a building for the king's use was built in the bailey. In 1244, when the Scots threatened to invade England, King Henry III visited the castle and ordered it to be rebuilt in white limestone, at a cost of about £2,600. (Note: Comparison of medieval financial figures with modern equivalents is notoriously challenging. For comparison, £2,600 is around thirteen times the £200 a year average income of a baron during this period.) The work was carried out between 1245 and 1270, and included the construction of a towered curtain wall, a gatehouse of considerable size with two large towers, two smaller gatehouses, a small watergate, a small gateway into the city, a chapel, and a new stone keep.

==== Clifford's Tower ====
Clifford's Tower in 2026

The new stone keep, built between 1245 and 1272 for Henry III, was first known as the King's Tower, and later Clifford's Tower. (Note: For the purposes of this article, the keep is referred to as Clifford's Tower throughout.) There are two explanations offered for the origin of the later name. It has been cited as evidence that the Clifford family claimed that the post of constable to be hereditary. Others suggest that it refers to Roger Clifford, 2nd Baron Clifford, who was involved in a rebellion against Edward II. He was executed after the Battle of Boroughbridge in 1322 and his body hung on a gibbet at the castle. The first recorded use of the name "Clifford's Tower" was in 1596 in correspondence about a scandal involving a gaoler who was selling stone from part of the building he had demolished.

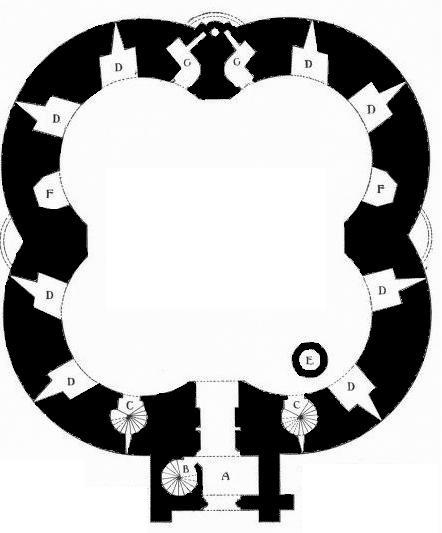
A plan of Clifford's Tower. A=Gateway; B=Stairway to Chapel above; C=Staircases to upper levels and parapet; D=Loop hole recesses; E=Well; F=Fireplaces; G=Garderobe chambers

The keep is of an unusual design. The two-storey tower has a quatrefoil plan with four circular lobes. Each lobe measures 22 ft (6.7 m) across, with walls 9 ft 6 in (2.90 m) thick; at its widest, the tower is 79 ft (24 m) across. A square gatehouse, 21 ft (6.4 m) wide, protected the entrance on the south side between two of the lobes. There are defensive turrets between the other lobes. Large corbels and a central pier supported the huge weight of stone and the first floor. Loopholes of a design unique to York Castle provided firing points. A chapel was built over the entrance, measuring 15 by 14 ft (4.6 by 4.3 m) doubling as a portcullis chamber as at Harlech and Chepstow Castles. The tower is believed to be an experiment in improving flanking fire by making more ground visible from the summit of the keep. Although unique in England, the design of the tower closely resembles that at Étampes in France, and may have influenced the design of the future keep of Pontefract Castle. Henry employed master mason Henry de Rayns and chief carpenter Simon of Northampton for the project, and the cost of the tower accounted for the majority of the overall expenditure on the castle during this period of work.

The new castle needed constant investment to maintain its quality as a military fortification. There was originally a chapel, which had a new lead roof put on it in 1312. Winter floods in 1315–16 damaged the soil at the base of the motte, requiring immediate repairs. Further repairs were carried out in 1360-65, to fix cracks in the masonry. Around 1358–60, the heavy stone keep again suffered from subsidence and the south-eastern lobe cracked from top to bottom. Royal officials recommended that the keep be completely rebuilt, but, instead, the lobe was repaired at a cost of £200. (Note: Comparison of medieval financial figures with modern equivalents is notoriously challenging. For comparison, this sum corresponds to the £200 a year average income of a baron during this period.)

Edward I gave wide-reaching powers to the sheriff of Yorkshire for enforcing law and order in the city of York, and the sheriffs established their headquarters in Clifford's Tower during his reign (1272 to 1307).

The keep was neglected through the 15th and 16th centuries, and the upper portion was demolished in 1596 by a gaoler in order to sell the stone (when it was first referred to by its current name). The tower was garrisoned by Royalists in 1642-3, damaged during a siege in 1644 and repaired in 1652. After an explosion in 1684 badly damaged it, the keep was abandoned. By the 18th century it was a feature in a large private estate, until being becoming part of a new prison in 1825. Restoration work was undertaken in 1902-3, 1915, 1920-23 and 1936.

=== 14th century ===
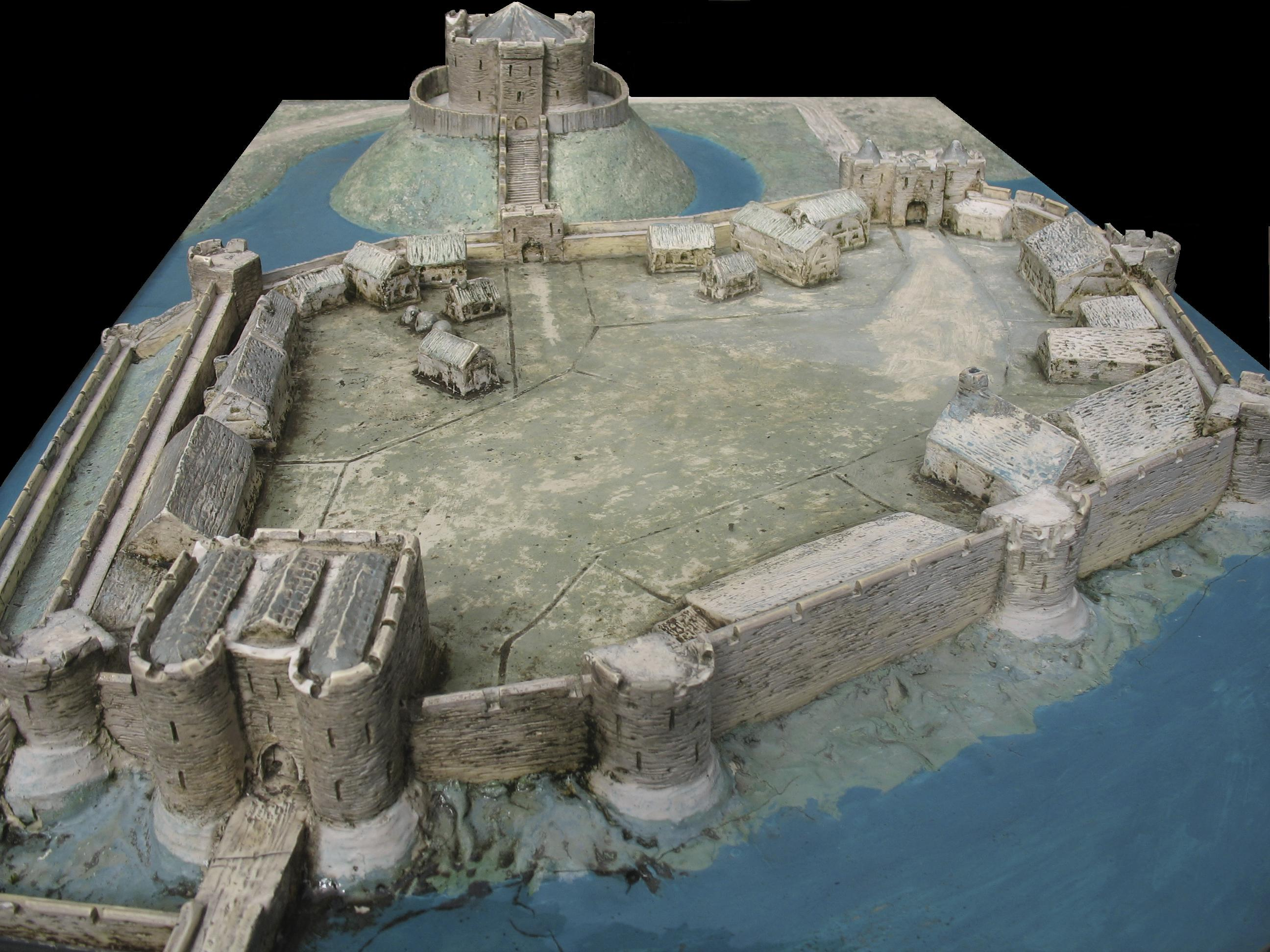
A reconstruction of York Castle in the 14th century, viewed from the south-east

During the wars against the Scots under both Edward and his son, York Castle also formed the centre of royal administration in England for almost half the years between 1298 and 1338. Many Westminster institutions followed the king north to York, basing themselves in the castle compound. The existing castle buildings were insufficient to house all the administrative institutions; a temporary building inside the castle was built for the Court of Common Pleas at the beginning of the period, and rebuilt on a larger scale during 1319–20. The Exchequer took over Clifford's Tower.

Other buildings around the city had to be commandeered to absorb the overflow from the castle itself. As a result of the extended use of the castle for these purposes, the law courts at York Castle began to compete with those in London, a pattern that lasted into the 1360s. The castle eventually acquired its own mint in 1344, when Edward III decided to create a permanent mint in York Castle to produce gold and silver coins to serve the needs of the north of England. European coiners were brought to York to establish the facility.

Henry III extended the castle's role as a jail for holding a wide range of prisoners. The sheriff was responsible for the jail at this time, and his deputy usually took the role of a full-time jailer. Up to three hundred and ten prisoners were held in the castle at any one time. The conditions in which prisoners were held were "appalling", and led to the widespread loss of life amongst detainees. Prison escapes were relatively common, and many of them, such as the break-out by 28 prisoners in 1298, were successful. When the Military Order of the Knights Templar was dissolved in England in 1307, York Castle was used to hold many of the arrested knights. The castle mills, as former Templar property, returned to royal control at the same time. Edward II also used the castle as a jail in his campaign against his rebellious barons in 1322, and after the Battle of Boroughbridge many of the defeated rebel leaders were executed at York Castle.

By the end of the 14th century, the castle bailey was primarily occupied by the local county administration. It was used extensively as a jail, with prisoners being kept in the various towers around the bailey. The old castle-guard system for securing the castle had changed into a system whereby the crown used rents from local royal lands to hire local guards for the castle. Increasingly, royalty preferred to stay at the Franciscan friary, between the castle and King's Staith on the Ouse, while their staff resided at St Mary's Abbey and St Andrew's Priory in the Fishergate area.

=== 15th and 16th centuries ===
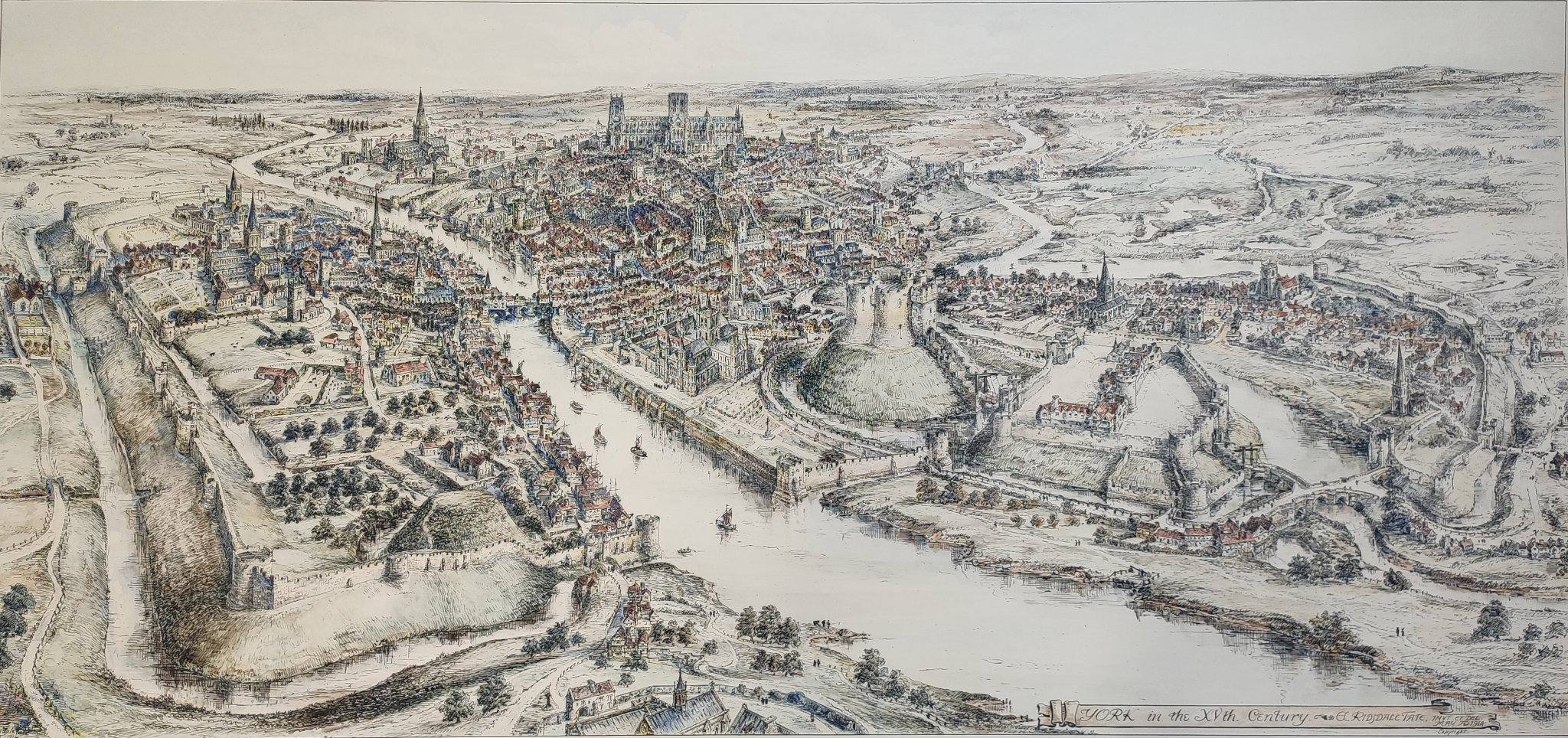
A panorama of 15th-century York by E. Ridsdale Tate; York Castle is on the right-hand side of river, opposite the abandoned motte of Baile Hill on the left-hand side.

In the 15th century, York Castle, along with Nottingham Castle, was considered a key security asset in the north of England, but investment even in these castles diminished. Repairs to York Castle grew infrequent from 1400 onwards, and it fell into increasing disrepair. Richard III recognised the issue and in 1483 had some of the most decrepit structures removed, but he died at the Battle of Bosworth before replacement work could commence. By the reign of Henry VIII, the antiquary John Leland reported that the castle was in considerable disrepair; nonetheless the water defences remained intact, unlike those of many other castles of the period. As a result of the deterioration, Henry had to be advised that the king's councillors no longer had any official residence in which to stay and work when they were in York. The castle mint was shut down after the death of Edward VI in 1553, and the castle mills were given to a local charitable hospital in 1464. The hospital was then closed during the Reformation, and the mills passed into private ownership once again.

The castle continued to be used as a jail, increasingly for local felons, and a location for political executions. By the 16th century it had become traditional to execute traitors by hanging them from the top of Clifford's Tower, rather than killing them at Micklegate Bar, the usual previous location for capital punishment in York. In 1536, for example, the political leader Robert Aske was executed at York Castle on the orders of Henry VIII, following the failure of Aske's Pilgrimage of Grace protest against the dissolution of the monasteries. For most of the period the sheriffs of Yorkshire remained in control of the castle, although there were some notable exceptions such as the appointment of the royal favourite Sir Robert Ryther by Edward IV in 1478. (Note: Ryther was unusual in being granted control of the castle as well from 1478 onwards on a personal basis, as this was usually reserved for the sheriff.) At the end of the 16th century, however, the Clifford family (Earls of Cumberland), became the hereditary constables of the castle, and Clifford's Tower took its name from the family at around this time.

The deterioration of the castle continued into the reign of Elizabeth I, who was advised that it no longer had any military utility. Robert Redhead, the tower keeper, became infamous at the time for taking parts of the castle to pieces and selling off the stonework for his own profit. Despite numerous attempts by local city and crown officials to halt this, Redhead continued to cause considerable damage before being forced to stop. Proposals were made to pull down Clifford's Tower altogether in 1596, but were turned down because of the strength of local feeling.

=== 17th century ===
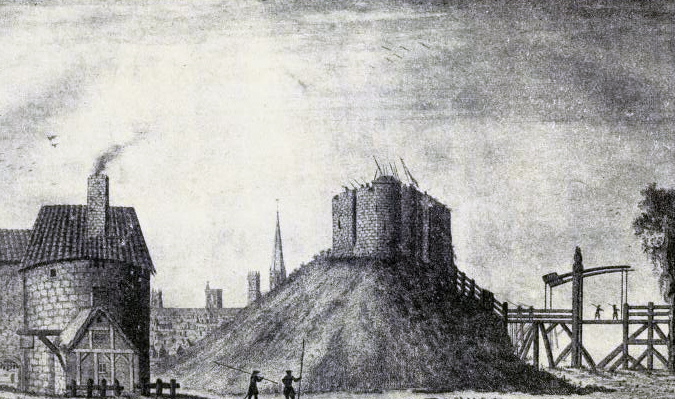
York Castle in 1644 during the English Civil War, after Francis Place

Maintaining the castle was becoming increasingly expensive, and in 1614 King James sold the lease on Clifford's Tower and the surrounding land to John Babington and Edmund Duffield, a pair of property speculators. In turn, Babington and Duffield sold Clifford's Tower to a York merchant family. In 1642, however, the English Civil War broke out between the rival factions of the Royalists and Parliament. Forces loyal to Charles I, under the command of Henry Clifford, garrisoned York Castle and the surrounding city in 1643. York effectively became the "northern capital" for the Royalist cause. Clifford repaired the castle and strengthened the walls to permit them to support cannon, placing his arms alongside those of the king above the entrance. Clifford's Tower's gatehouse was substantially remodelled, losing its original medieval appearance. Baile Hill, on the other side of the river, became a gun emplacement. The castle mint was reopened to supply the king's forces with coins.

The war turned against the Royalist factions, and on 23 April 1644 Parliamentary forces commenced the siege of York. A Scottish army under Alexander Leslie came from the south, while a Parliamentary force under Ferdinando Fairfax came from the east. Six weeks later, Edward Montagu brought a third contingent to York, bringing the number of forces besieging the city to over 30,000 men. William Cavendish commanded the city during the siege, while Colonel Sir Francis Cobb was appointed the governor of the castle. Despite bombardment, attempts to undermine the walls and attacks on the gates, the city held out through May and June. Prince Rupert, sent to relieve York, approached with reinforcements, and through clever manoeuvring was able to force the besiegers to withdraw, lifting the siege on 1 July. The next day, Parliamentary forces defeated Rupert at the Battle of Marston Moor, six miles west of York, making the surrender of York and the castle inevitable. On 14 July the city and castle surrendered to the Parliamentary forces, who permitted the Royalists to march out with full honours.

Parliament then appointed Thomas Dickenson, the local mayor, as the governor of Clifford's Tower. Control of the castle rested with the post of mayor until the Restoration. Efforts were made to separate the structures of Clifford's Tower, which Parliament used as a garrison, from the buildings of the bailey, which continued to be used as a prison. Oliver Cromwell visited Clifford's Tower in 1650, and received a salute from the guns stationed on top of it. The cost of the garrison was levied on the city of York.

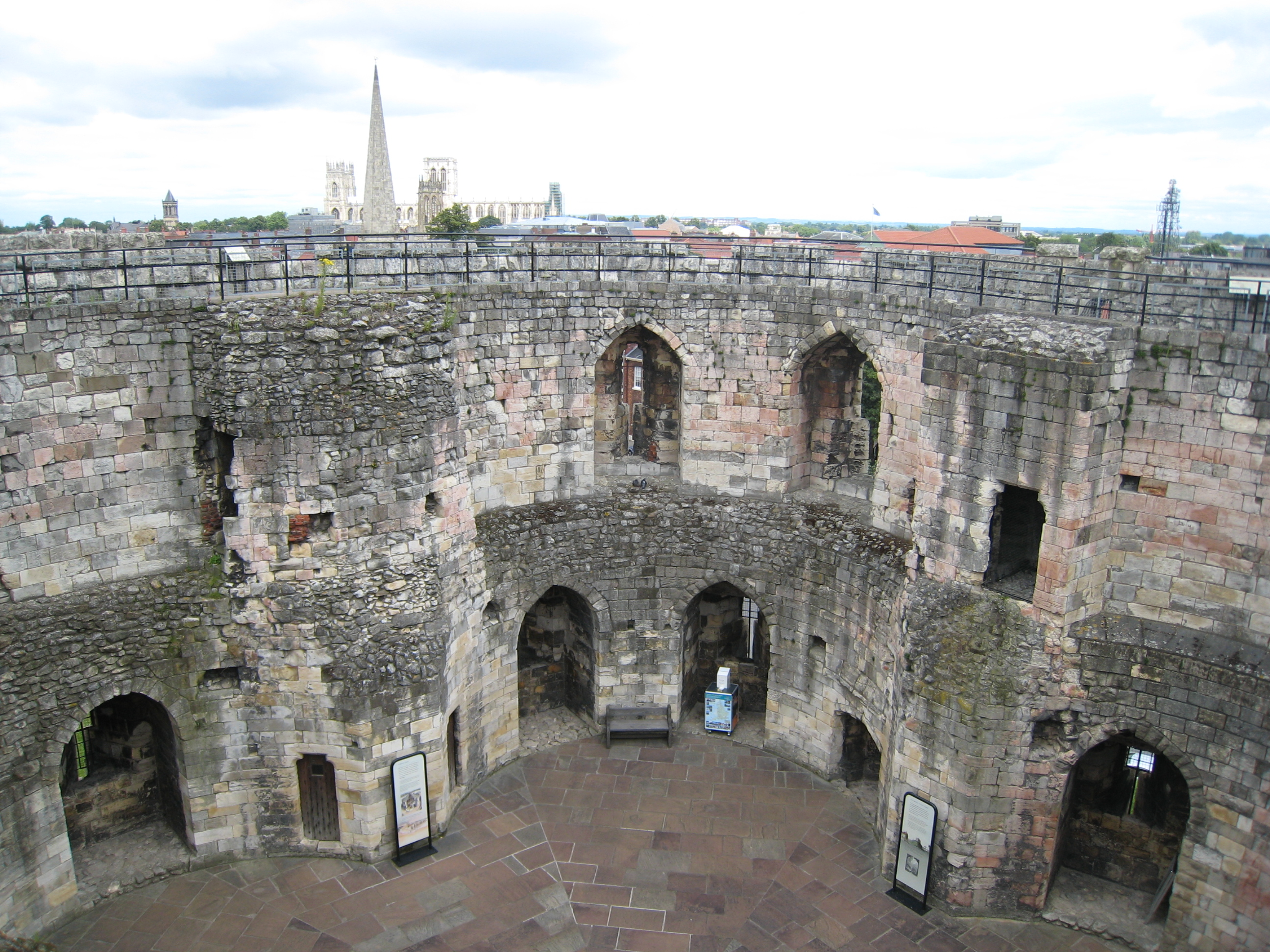
A massive explosion in 1684 destroyed the roof, floor and central pillar of Clifford's Tower, leaving only the walls intact. In 2022 a wooden roof and viewing platform was added to the remains.

After the Restoration of Charles II, the pre-war owners of the property laid claim to Clifford's Tower, eventually being granted ownership. A garrison continued to be stationed there, however, which prevented the owners from actually occupying or using the property. Repairs were made to the tower, and it became a magazine for storing gunpowder and shot. Attempts were made to restore the condition of the moat, which had become badly silted. Some political prisoners continued to be held at the castle during the Restoration period, including George Fox, the founder of the Society of Friends.

The county facilities in the bailey were expanded during these years, with improvements to the Grand Jury House and the Common Hall, but by the 1680s the role of the military garrison at York Castle was being called into question. Sir Christopher Musgrave produced a report for the Crown in 1682; he argued that it would cost at least £30,000 to turn the castle into a modern fortification, producing a proposal for the six bastions that such a star fort would require. This work was never carried out. Meanwhile, the garrison and the castle had become extremely unpopular with the people of York, who disliked both the cost and the imposition of external authority.

On St George's Day in 1684 at around 10 pm, an explosion in the magazine destroyed the interior of Clifford's Tower entirely. The official explanation was that the celebratory salute from the guns on the roof had set fire to parts of the woodwork, which later ignited the magazine. Most historians, however, believe the explosion was not accidental. At the time, it was common in the city to toast the potential demolition of the "Minced Pie", as the castle was known to locals; suspiciously, some members of the garrison had moved their personal belongings to safety just before the explosion, and no-one from the garrison was injured by the event. The heat of the fire turned the limestone of the tower to its current, slightly pink, colour. The now-ruined tower was returned fully to private ownership, eventually forming part of the lands of the neighbouring house and gardens belonging to Samuel Waud.

=== 18th century ===
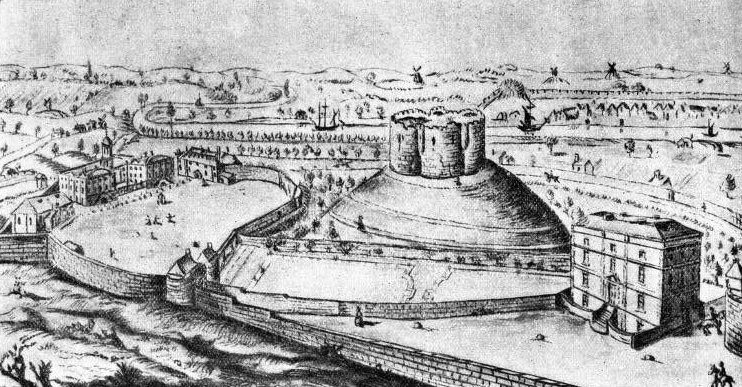
A sketch of the York Castle site in around 1730; left to right, the site of the former bailey, including the Sessions House, the County Gaol and the Jury House; Clifford's Tower, with the River Foss in front and the Ouse behind; Samuel Waud's house and gardens

By 1701, the conditions of the county jail had become scandalous and the decision was taken to redevelop the area occupied by the old bailey. A local tax helped to fund the development, and the king agreed for the ruins of St Mary's Abbey to be cannibalised for building stone. Three new buildings were erected to the south of Clifford's Tower. A new county jail, built between 1701 and 1705 by William Wakefield, was placed on the south side, closely resembling the fashionable work of John Vanbrugh. The local architect John Carr then built the Assize Courts on the site of the old Jury House between 1773 and 1777 on the west side, and oversaw the replacement of the Sessions House and Common Hall by the Female Prison between 1780 and 1783 on the east side. The Female Prison and county jail were later combined to become the Debtors' Prison. Both of Carr's buildings were designed in a distinctive neoclassical style; the Assize Court building was particularly praised at the time as being "a superb building of the Ionic order". The castle courtyard was grassed over to form a circle in 1777 and became known as the "Eye of the Ridings" because it was used for the election of members of parliament for York.

Visits by the prison reformer John Howard as part of the research for his book The State of the Prisons found these prisons flawed, but in relatively good condition compared to others at the time. The Debtors' Prison as a whole was an "honour to the county" of York, with "airy and healthy" rooms, but the felons' wing of the prison attracted some criticism. The felons' wing was "too small" and had "no water" for the inmates; felons were forced to sleep on piles of straw on the floor. Indeed, conditions were so bad in the felons' wing that nine prisoners suffocated in one night during 1739.

Just outside the main walls, the castle mills had become increasingly ineffective from the 16th century onwards because of a reduction in the flow of the rivers driving the water-wheels. As a result, in 1778 they were rebuilt with a new steam engine to drive the machinery; this steam engine caused considerable discomfort to the prisoners affected by the smoke and noise.

=== 19th century ===
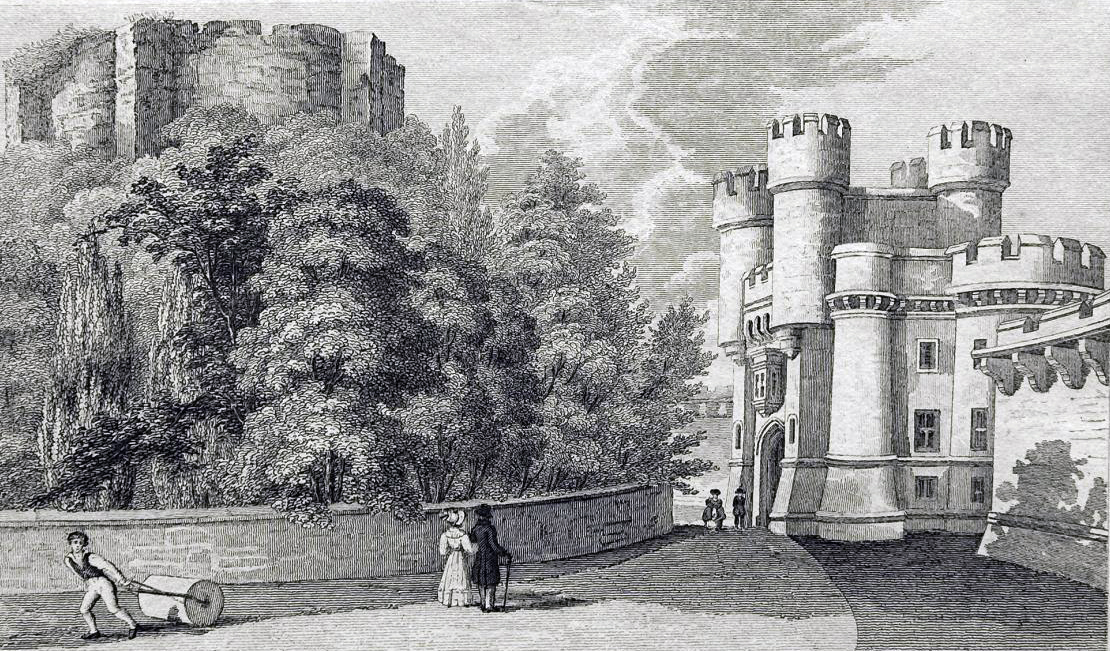
The crenellated Tudor Gothic gatehouse of the new 1825 prison at York Castle, alongside Clifford's Tower at left, depicted in 1830

Criticism of the castle prison increased at the end of the 18th century. The facilities were felt to be inadequate and the crowds of spectators who gathered outside the prison to see inmates being taken into York for execution unseemly. Attempts were made to improve the way executions were carried out from 1803 onwards: the former castle courtyard, the Eye of the Ridings, was used for this purpose instead, although crowds still gathered outside the bailey to watch the slow deaths of the prisoners. By 1813 the execution process had been sped up by the introduction of the "short drop" method of hanging, allowing the unusually rapid execution of fourteen Luddite agitators at the castle in 1814. Overcrowding in the jail was now also a problem, with up to 114 prisoners being held at any one time; occasionally, around forty prisoners awaiting trial had to be kept in the jail yard for lack of space elsewhere. Other radicals imprisoned there included Joshua Hobson and Alice Mann in 1836.

The suitability of the prison was finally brought to a head at the 1821 assizes in York, when an official complaint was made and an investigation begun. The decision was taken to purchase Clifford's Tower and the Waud house, with the aim of demolishing them both to make room for a new, more modern prison. Sydney Smith, the famous wit, writer and vicar of Foston-le-Clay, successfully led a campaign to save Clifford's Tower, emphasising the historic importance of the location for the surrounding city. An alternative proposal, put forward by architect Robert Wallace, would have seen the conversion of Clifford's Tower back into a habitable building to form the hub of a radial prison design, but this was turned down.

In 1825, Clifford's Tower and the Waud house were purchased by the county of Yorkshire at the cost of £8,800 (equivalent to £810,000 in 2024) The new prison buildings, designed by architects P. F. Robinson and G. T. Andrews, were constructed in a Tudor Gothic style, including a gatehouse 35 ft (11 m) high and a radial prison block, protected by a long, high stone wall. The prison, considered to be the strongest such building in England, was built entirely of stone to be both secure and fireproof. Dark grey gritstone was used in the construction to produce a forbidding appearance, although the prison itself was considered healthy and well ventilated. Clifford's Tower played no part in the formal design of the prison, although the talus, or sloping edge of the motte, was cut away and replaced by a retaining wall to allow more space for the new prison building. The backyard of the Female Prison, concealed from public view by the new wall, was used for hangings from 1868 onwards.

The Prison Act, 1877, reformed the English prison system, and York Castle jail was passed into the control of central government the following year. It was used as the county prison until 1900, when the remaining prisoners were transferred to Wakefield Prison, and from then onwards the facility was used as a military prison instead.

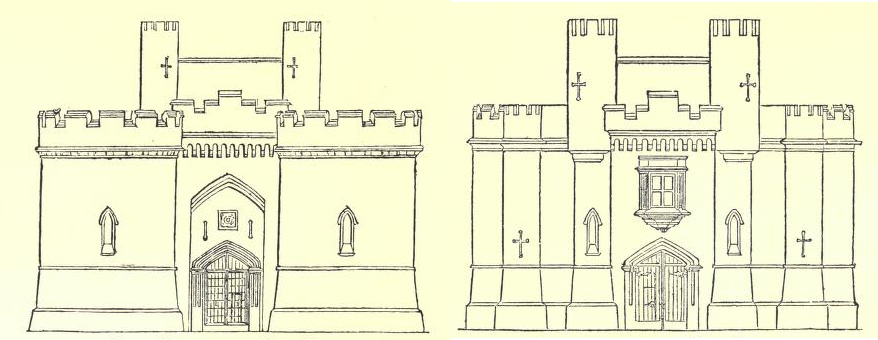
Architects Robinson and Andrews' original design for the front (l) and interior (r) elevations of the new 1825 York Castle prison gatehouse

By the early 19th century, dredging and other improvements to the river Foss had made it possible to import flour into York by river, reducing the economic significance of the castle mills. In 1856, the castle mills were finally demolished as part of a further sequence of improvements to this part of the river. The King's Pool that formed part of the castle's water defences was drained. With the construction of several new bridges near the castle, the site became "surrounded by roads instead of moats". Some major trials took place at the Assizes (now Crown Court) building of York Castle in the 19th century, including that of Mary Fitzpatrick who was accused of murder.

=== 20th century ===
In 1890 the Prison Commissioners agreed to declare Clifford's Tower a national monument and to conserve it as a historic location. In 1902 Clifford's Tower was given to the York Corporation, together with a grant of £3,000 (equivalent to £420,000 in 2024) arranged by Lord Wenlock for conservation and repairs. The removal of the talus and the damage to the castle stonework in the 16th century had put excessive pressure on the supporting motte, causing a recurrence of the 14th-century subsidence. Sir Basil Mott, a leading Victorian engineer, installed concrete underpinnings to stabilise the structure beneath the gatehouse. By the early 20th century, Clifford's Tower was regularly open to visitors, and in 1915 it was passed to the Office of Works as a national monument. The castle was historically excluded from York's municipal boundaries; it was formally absorbed into the city in 1968.

== Today ==
The Female Prison, now part of York Castle Museum

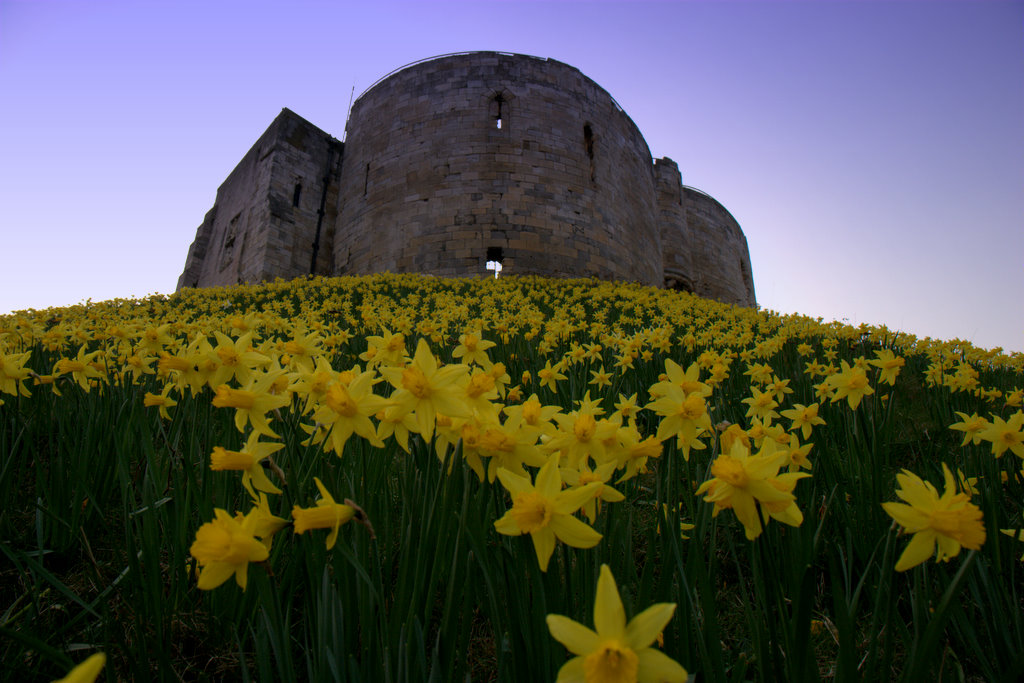
In the 20th century daffodils were planted on the side of the motte. They flower annually around the anniversary of the massacre of Jews at the castle in 1190.

York Prison finally closed in 1929, and the Tudor Gothic Victorian prison buildings were demolished in 1935. The Assize Courts building now houses the York Crown Court, while the former Debtors' Prison and Female Prison, together with a modern entrance area, are now the Castle Museum. The circular grassed area between these buildings that was once known as the "Eye of the Ridings" is now known as Castle Green, or the "Eye of York". Clifford's Tower is the most prominent surviving part of the original medieval fortification, although the stone steps up the side of the motte are modern. Fragments of the bailey wall, parts of the south gatehouse and one of the corner towers also survive.

The castle is classed as a Grade I listed building and a scheduled monument. The site, managed by English Heritage, is open to the public. Until the 1970s, the pogrom of 1190 was often underplayed by official histories of the castle; early official guides to the castle made no reference to it. In 1978, however, the first memorial tablet to the victims was laid at the base of Clifford's Tower, and in 1990 the 800th anniversary of the killings was commemorated at the tower. Recently, commercial interests have sought to introduce retail development to the area surrounding it. Citizens, visitors, academics, environmentalists, local businesspeople and Jewish groups have opposed the development with some success, winning a lengthy and bitter public inquiry in 2003.

In March 2022 an English Heritage conservation project, including work on the limestone fabric of the tower and care of the chapel roof, was completed. New internal access stairways of gluelam timber leading to a new roof deck allow visitors a close view of some original features of the building and less-crowded viewpoints over the city.

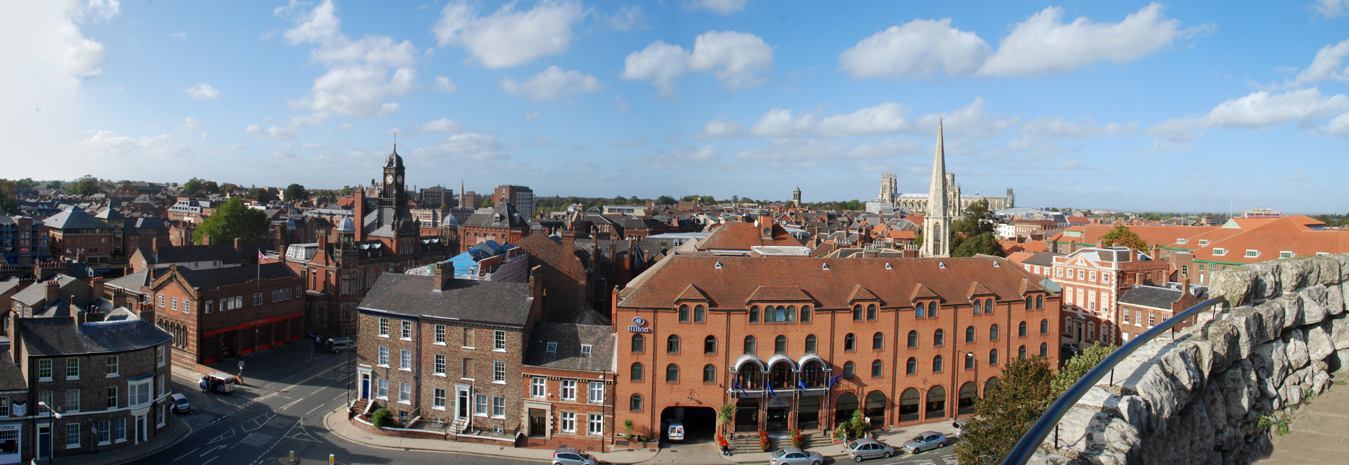
The view today from Clifford's Tower facing York Minster on the skyline (slightly obscured)

== See also ==
- Grade I listed buildings in the City of York
- Listed buildings in York (within the city walls, southern part)

== Bibliography ==
- Brown, Reginald Allen (2004). Allen Brown's English Castles. Woodbridge, UK: Boydell Press. doi:10.1017/9781846152429. ISBN 978-1-84383-069-6.
- Butler, Lawrence (1997). Clifford's Tower and the Castles of York. London: English Heritage. ISBN 1-85074-673-7.
- Clark, G. T. (1874). "The Defences of York". The Archaeological Journal. 31: 221–261. doi:10.1080/00665983.1874.10851641.
- Cooper, Thomas Parsons (1911). The History of the Castle of York, from its Foundation to the Current Day with an Account of the Building of Clifford's Tower. London: Elliot Stock. OCLC 4246355.
- Dobson, Barry (2003). "The Medieval York Jewry Reconsidered". In Skinner, Patricia (ed.). The Jews in Medieval Britain: Historical, Literary, and Archaeological Perspectives. Woodbridge, UK: Boydell Press. ISBN 978-0-85115-931-7.
- Hillaby, Joe (2003). "Jewish Colonisation in the Twelfth Century". In Skinner, Patricia (ed.). The Jews in Medieval Britain: Historical, Literary, and Archaeological Perspectives. Woodbridge, UK: Boydell Press. ISBN 978-0-85115-931-7.
- Howard, John (1777), The State of the Prisons in England and Wales, W. Ayres
- Hull, Lise E. (2006) Britain's Medieval Castles. Westport: Praeger. ISBN 978-0-275-98414-4.
- McLynn, Frank. (2007) Lionheart and Lackland: King Richard, King John and the Wars of Conquest. London: Vintage. ISBN 978-0-7126-9417-9.
- Musson, Anthony (2008). "Court Venues and the Politics of Justice". In Saul, Nigel (ed.). Fourteenth Century England. Vol. 5. Woodbridge, UK: Boydell Press. ISBN 978-1-84383-387-1.
- Pounds, Norman John Greville. (1990) The Medieval Castle in England and Wales: a Social and Political History. Cambridge: Cambridge University Press. ISBN 978-0-521-45828-3.
- Saul, Nigel, ed. (2008). Fourteenth Century England. Vol. 5. Woodbridge, UK: Boydell Press. ISBN 978-1-84383-387-1.
- Sears, Robert. (1847) A New and Popular Pictorial Description of England, Scotland, Ireland, Wales and the British Islands. New York: Robert Sears. OCLC 557568051.
- Skinner, Patricia, ed. (2003). The Jews in Medieval Britain: Historical, Literary, and Archaeological Perspectives. Woodbridge, UK: Boydell Press. ISBN 978-0-85115-931-7.
- Stenton, Doris Mary. (1976) English Society in the Early Middle Ages (1066–1307). Harmondsworth, UK: Penguin. ISBN 0-14-020252-8.
- Timbs, John; Gunn, Alexander (2008). Abbeys, Castles and Ancient Halls of England and Wales: Their Legendary Lore and Popular History. Vol. 3. Alcester, UK: Read Books. ISBN 978-1-4437-8400-9.
- Toy, Sidney. (1985) Castles: Their Construction and History. New York: Dover Publications. ISBN 978-0-486-24898-1.
- Twyford, Anthony William. (2010) Records of York Castle – Fortress, Courthouse and Prison. Alcester, UK: Read Books. ISBN 978-1-4455-7111-9.
- Wedgwood, C. V. (1970). The King's War: 1641–1647. London: Fontana. OCLC 254381447.
