= Velho Cemetery =

Jewish cemetery in London, England

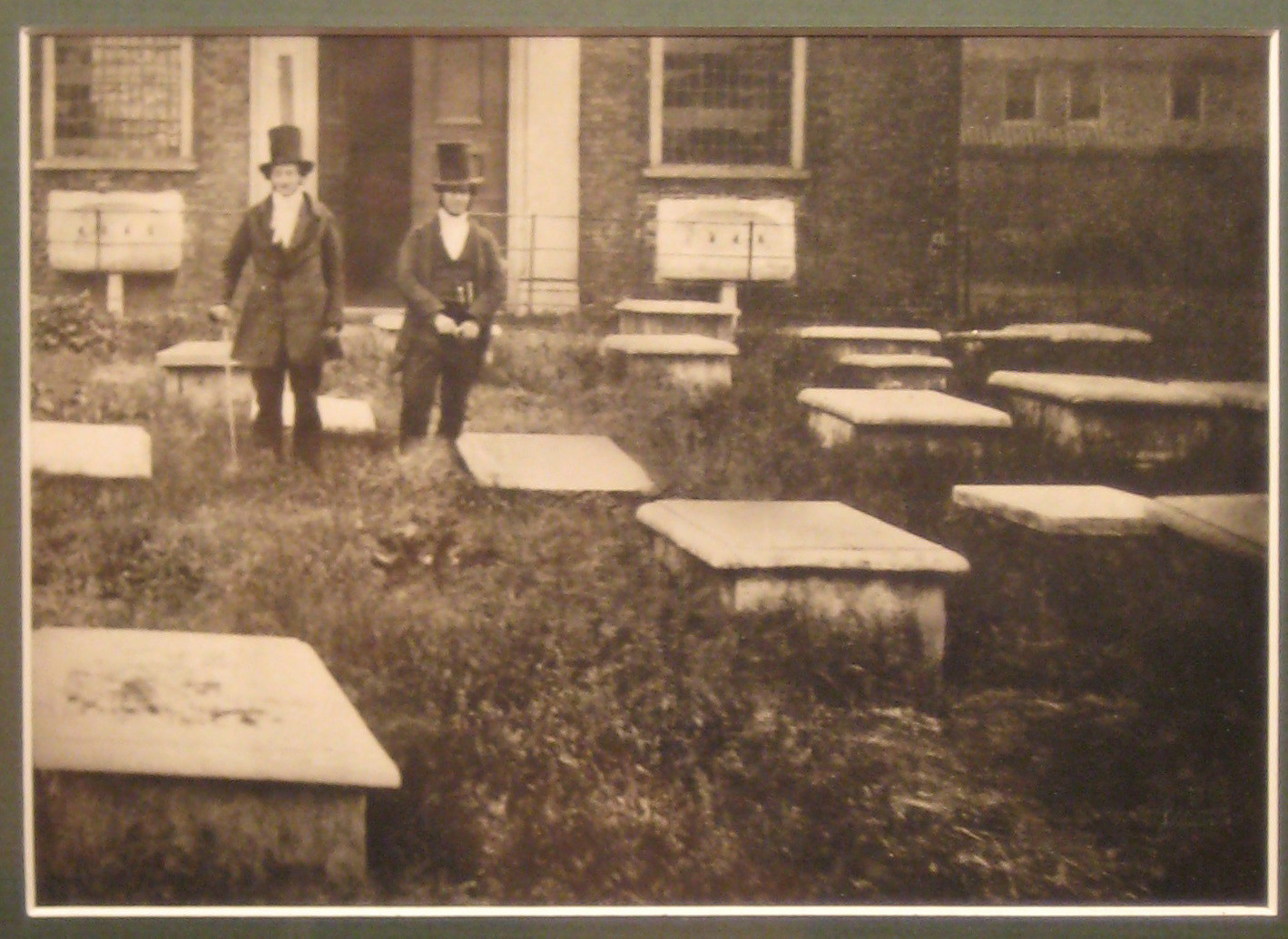
- David Aaron de Sola and Abraham Pereira Mendes visiting the cemetery, circa 1848
- Interactive map of Velho Cemetery

Details
- Established: 1657
- Closed: 1735
- Location: Mile End, London, England, United Kingdom
- Coordinates: 51.522950°N 0.043984°W
- Type: Sephardic Jewish
- Owned by: Queen Mary University
- Size: 0.78 acres (0.32 ha)
- No. of graves: 1706
- Find a Grave: Velho Cemetery

Designations

Listed Building – Grade II
- Official name: Velho Cemetery of the Spanish and Portuguese Jewish Congregation of London
- Designated: 30 May 1974
- Reference no.: 1319658

The Velho Cemetery ("Old Cemetery") is a disused Jewish burial ground in Mile End, London. It is the oldest surviving Jewish cemetery in the United Kingdom, founded in 1657 by members of the Creechurch Lane synagogue, which was itself the first synagogue to be established in the country since the 1290 expulsion of the Jews. The land for the cemetery was paid for by Antonio Fernandez Carvajal and Simon de Cacares.

It is one of only two cemeteries in the UK intended primarily for the Sephardic Jewish community (the other being the nearby Novo Cemetery). It is also adjacent to (but separate from) Alderney Road Cemetery, the oldest surviving cemetery in the UK established primarily for the Ashkenazi Jewish community.

== History ==
=== Background ===
Jewish people had been expelled from England in 1290 by edict of Edward I, with their assets seized and their religious sites (including cemeteries) destroyed. Spain and Portugal issued similar edicts in the 1490s which demanded all Jews choose between converting to Catholicism or exile, which led to the emergence of "Marranos"—Jews who pretended to be Christians in public while still practicing their real faith in private. The Marranos were a frequent target of suspicion, investigation, and violent discrimination by both the state (via the Inquisition) and the general public, and over the following decades many of Iberia's Sephardic Jewish merchants used their resources to flee to more tolerant cities in Protestant northern Europe—especially Amsterdam.

By the early 17th century a small number of merchants had also moved to London, where—even though the edict of 1290 remained in place—attitudes towards the immigrant Marranos had slightly softened in the wake of the English Reformation (as well as towards other forms of Christian non-conformity), though they still had to pretend to be Spanish Catholics in public, and antisemitism was still widespread. The question of whether and how much the state should tolerate Judaism was an issue within the broader debates over religious freedoms that contributed to the outbreak of the Wars of the Three Kingdoms in 1639, and it remained the subject of a pamphlet war after the establishment of the Protectorate by Oliver Cromwell in 1653.

While some advocates for readmitting the Jews to Britain did so as part of a wider argument for religious tolerance and freedom of conscience, most did so because they believed it was a necessary precondition of their eventual conversion to Christianity, and therefore also the end times. Cromwell was broadly sympathetic to arguments for readmittance, though there remains debate over whether his motivations were primarily theological (as a millenarian), economic (believing that Jewish merchants would help revive the English economy post-war), or political (as part of a strategy to steal Dutch trade, and because Jewish merchants had become valuable sources of foreign intelligence). Cromwell was also influenced by Menasseh Ben Israel, who travelled to London from Amsterdam in September 1655 to make the case for readmittance directly to the new government. This led to Cromwell convening the Whitehall Conference in December 1655, which established that with the fall of the monarchy the royal edict of 1290 was no longer in effect, and that therefore there was no longer a ban on Jews living in England. However, the Conference failed to agree on new laws protecting the religious freedom of Jewish people.

Contemporary writers estimated that there were around 20 Sephardic Jewish families living in London at the time of the Whitehall Conference, numbering roughly 100 people total. From 1650 onwards these families met weekly to worship together in secret at the Spanish Embassy under the leadership of Antonio Fernandez Carvajal, a wealthy Portuguese-born merchant who had relocated to London in 1635. On 13 March 1656 one of the congregation's members—Antonio Rodrigues Robles, a Portuguese-born merchant who traded goods between London and the Canary Islands—had his two ships seized in the Port of London after the outbreak of war between Britain and Spain, and he was charged with being an enemy national. During the court proceedings he successfully defended himself by revealing his secret Portuguese-Jewish identity—a revelation which also forced the city's Sephardic community into the public eye.

Alarmed for their safety, the heads of six of the city's Jewish merchant families (Manuel Martinez Dormido, Abraham Coen Gonsales, Simon de Caceres, Domingo Vaez de Brito, Isak Lopes Chilon, and Carvajal) went with Menasseh to deliver a petition to Cromwell demanding protections for their commercial interests from seizure, but also the right to practice Judaism in the privacy of their own homes, as well as a number of other religious freedoms—including the right to have their own burial ground. There is no record of Cromwell's response to this petition, but many historians have suggested that it must have been positive as the community soon began openly practicing their faith (including establishing a public synagogue for the first time, on Creechurch Lane in Aldgate, in December 1656—the predecessor to Bevis Marks Synagogue). This marked the beginning of the permanent resettlement of Jewish people in England.

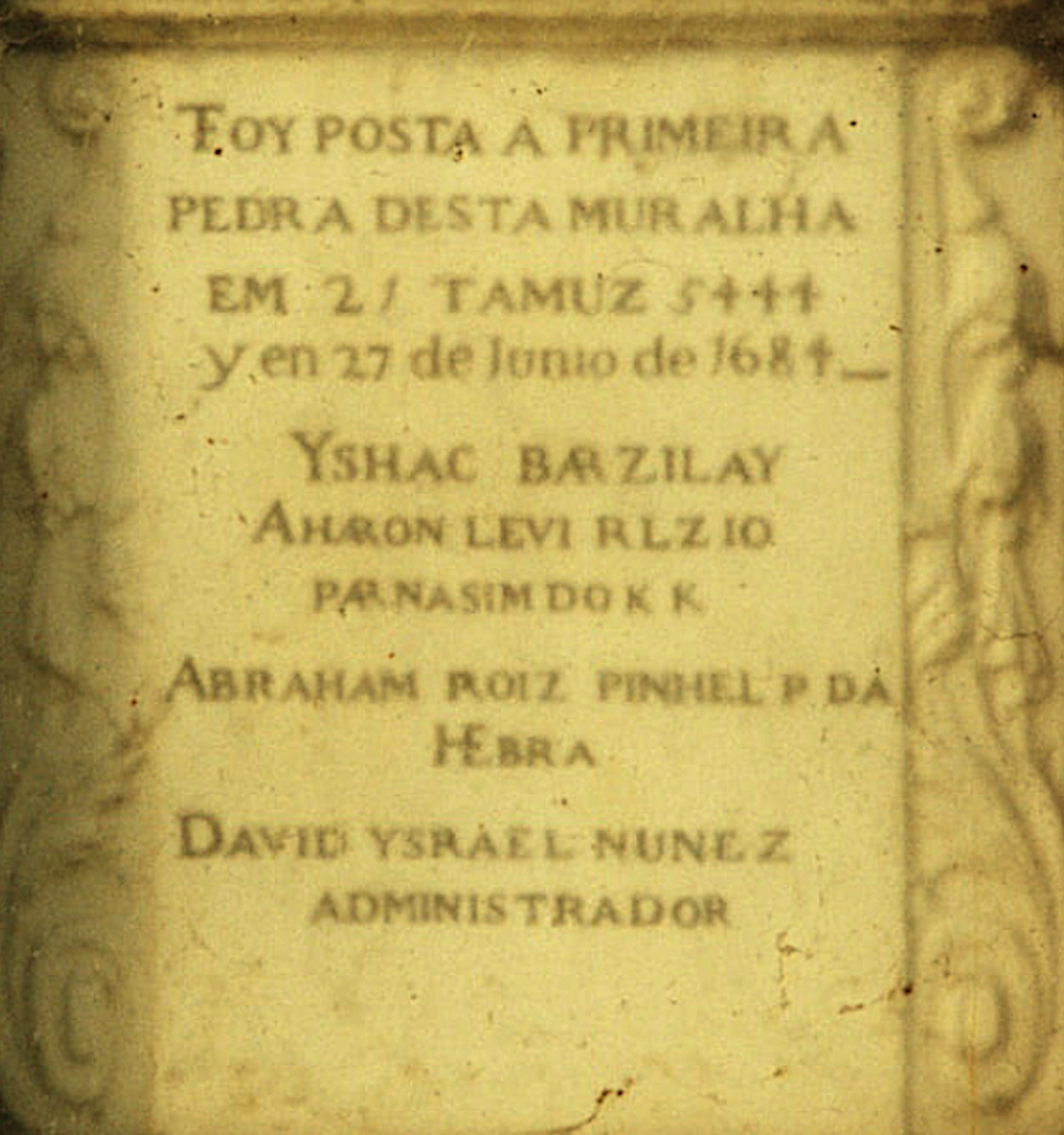
Inscription stone (in Portuguese) commemorating the building of the cemetery's boundary walls. In English, it reads: "The first stone of this wall was laid on 21 Tamuz 5444 or 27th June 1684 / Ishac Barzilay, Aaron Levi Rizio - Parnasim of The Holy Congregation / Abraham Roiz Pinhel - Parnas of the Hebra / David Israel Nunez - Administrator"

=== First post-resettlement cemetery ===
In 1657, Antonio Fernandez Carvajal and Simon de Cacares paid for a 14-year lease on two-thirds of an orchard in Mile End—which at that time was a small hamlet more than a mile east of the City of London—for use as a cemetery by the synagogue's congregation. The land adjoined an inn called The Soldier's Tenement, and the rent—£10/year—was ten times its market value, due to the "financial opportunism" of its owner.

The first burial—of the wife of Isaac de Brito—took place shortly after the cemetery was consecrated in 1657. Antonio Fernandez Carvajal was himself the second person to be buried there, dying on 10 November 1659 during surgery to remove gallstones. Samuel Pepys, who had been operated on by the same surgeon, attended a Sabbath service at the Creechurch Street synagogue on 3 December during the congregation's period of mourning.

There were relatively few burials in the cemetery in its first few decades—only five by 1660, and only 76 by 1683 (a rate of fewer than three per year). This was due to the fact that many of the pre-resettlement Marrano families already had members buried in Catholic cemeteries elsewhere whom they preferred to be buried alongside. Only one-third of the Jews known to have been living in England at the time of the resettlement (prior to 1659) went on to be buried in the cemetery, and burials only began to accelerate towards the end of the 17th century as post-Marrano generations grew older.

Additionally, there was an influx of Ashkenazi Jews from Eastern Europe to London as part of the resettlement, and they were also permitted to be buried in the cemetery. The Ashkenazi community eventually opened its own dedicated cemetery—the Alderney Road Cemetery—in 1696, adjacent to the original cemetery.

The site was extended in 1670, and then again in 1684 when a high brick wall was built around the perimeter. The land between the cemetery and Mile End Road was also secured for the establishment of the Hebra Geumilut Hasadim—a charitable hospital for poor women—in 1665.

=== Closure ===
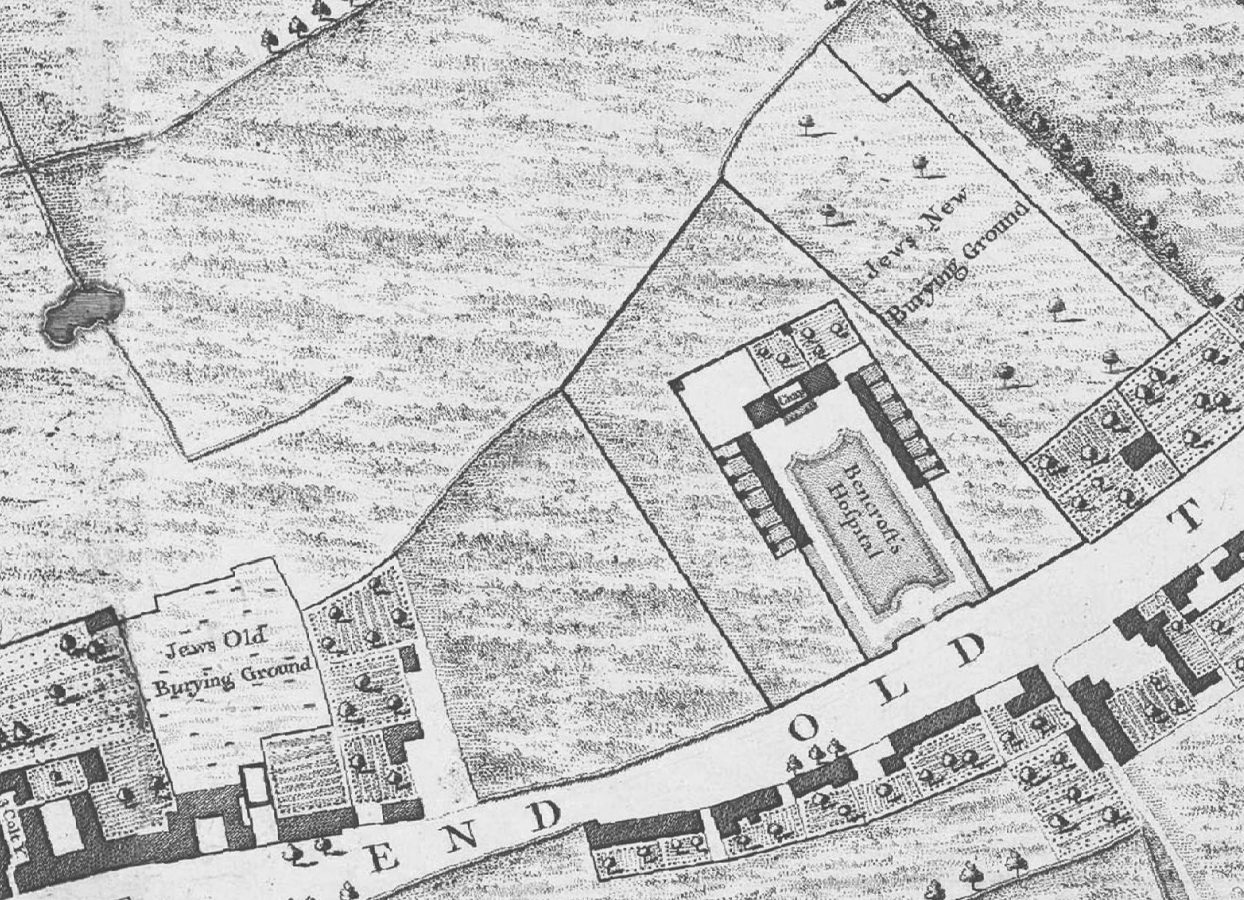
John Rocque's 1746 map of London shows the Velho Cemetery (left, "Jews Old Burying Ground") on Mile End Road. The Novo Cemetery ("Jews New Burying Ground") is on the right.

By the early 18th century there were more than 600 Jewish people living in London—both Sephardic and Ashkenazi—and it became clear that the small cemetery would soon be full. In 1726 a three-acre orchard 400 metres to the east was leased to become the Novo ("New" in Portuguese) Cemetery, while the original burial ground became known as the Velho ("Old") Cemetery.

The first burials at the Novo Cemetery took place in 1733, and the Velho Cemetery was officially closed in 1735. The Sephardic community also managed to finally purchase the freehold for the Velho Cemetery outright in 1737 for £200 (roughly £38,000 in 2024, adjusted for inflation), securing its safety from sale or redevelopment.

There were a small number of burials and interments in the years immediately following the cemetery's closure for those who had previously reserved plots, or who requested being buried alongside family members. The most recent burial in the cemetery took place in 1828, when Rabbi Raphael Meldola was (at his own request) buried at the feet of Rabbi David Nieto.

The Hebra Geumilut Hasadim Hospital continued to operate after the cemetery's closure, and in 1793 it was absorbed into another Sephardic hospital—Beth Holim, originally founded on Leman Street in 1747 as a place for "Sick Poor, Lying-in Women, and Asylum for the Aged." The new Beth Holim Hospital operated exclusively as a retirement home at the Mile End site for decades, and the cemetery at its rear was maintained as a garden for residents, with trees, paths, and seats. The original hospital buildings were replaced in 1913 by a new main building with a number of smaller adjoining cottages, designed by architect Manuel Nunes Castello. The retirement home later relocated to a new site in Wembley in 1977, and the former hospital building (Albert Stern House) is now accommodation for students of Queen Mary University.

== Modern site ==
Both the Velho and Novo cemeteries are now within the grounds of Queen Mary University—however, while Novo is open to the general public, Velho is only accessible via prior request to campus security, and it is only visible from the higher floors or back gardens of surrounding buildings. The entrance is behind Albert Stern House, at 253 Mile End Road. University buildings border the cemetery on the eastern and southern sides, while the northern and western sides border homes on Mile End Place and Carlyle Mews (with the exception of the northwestern corner, which borders the Alderney Road Cemetery).

The oldest graves are in the northwest corner of the site—at the furthest point from the entrance—and the newest along the southern edge. While most graves adhere to Sephardic tradition (laid flat against the ground, inscribed with only factual biographical information), some later burials are more expressive. This includes the elevated tombs of several prominent rabbis, as well as 631 children's (or "El Angelitos") graves, many of which incorporate winged cherubs in their inscriptions. The most common carved motif in the cemetery is that of an axe striking a tree.

Not all graves are marked. Many Marranos were uncircumcised as part of the pretense of being Catholic, and those who remained uncircumcised post-resettlement were subject to a degree of "internal marginalisation" by the community's elders—they had to request special dispensation to be buried in the cemetery, and, if granted, their graves would be positioned against the walls (away from the main group of graves) and left unmarked. There are also 15 victims of the plague of 1665 in unmarked graves.

There are records of 1,706 burials in the cemetery, and grave inscriptions are largely in Portuguese, though there is also some Hebrew and English on later graves. Most gravestones are made of limestone or marble, which means that many are now difficult (if not impossible) to read after centuries of weathering by rain, and the exact locations and identities of many of the dead have been lost. Several of the more prominent figures buried in the cemetery had their gravestones replaced as part of an early 20th century preservation effort; Antonio Fernandez Carvajal's was replaced in 1925, when a copy of the inscription on his original gravestone was also deposited in the archives of the municipal library in Leipzig.

While the Novo Cemetery suffered several direct hits by bombs during the Blitz, the Velho Cemetery avoided any significant damage—though a bomb that hit Grafton Street, on its eastern edge, destroyed some of the boundary wall.

The cemetery was Grade II-listed on 30 May 1974.

== Notable interments ==
- Antonio Fernandez Carvajal (c.1590-1659)
- Dr Fernando Mendes, physician to John IV and Charles II (1647-1724)
- Rabbi David Nieto (1654-1728)
- Rabbi Raphael Meldola (1754-1828)
- Rowland Gideon (first Jewish freeman of the City of London) (1655-1722)
- Isaac Lindo (founder of the Lindo family) (1638-1712)
