= Resettlement of the Jews in England =

Policy of tolerance towards Jews in Commonwealth-era England

The resettlement of the Jews in England was an informal arrangement during the Commonwealth of England in the mid-1650s that allowed Jews to practise their faith openly. It forms a prominent part of the history of the Jews in England. It happened directly after two events. First, a prominent rabbi, Menasseh ben Israel, came to the country from the Netherlands to make the case for Jewish resettlement, and second, a Spanish marrano (a Jew forcibly converted to Christianity who still practised Judaism in secret) merchant, Antonio Robles, requested that he be classified as a Jew rather than Spaniard during the war between England and Spain.

Historians have disagreed about the reasons behind the resettlement, particularly regarding Oliver Cromwell's motives, but the move is generally seen as a part of a current of religious and intellectual thought moving towards liberty of conscience, encompassing philosemitic millenarianism and Hebraicism, as well as political and trade interests favouring Jewish presence in England. The schools of thought that led to the resettlement of the Jews in England are the most heavily studied subject of Anglo-Jewish history in the period before the eighteenth century.

== Background ==
In 1290, King Edward I of England had issued an edict expelling all Jews from England. However, the English Reformation, which started in the 1530s, brought a number of changes that benefited Jews in the long term. Doctrines and rituals of the Roman Catholic church that insulted Jews were eliminated, especially those that emphasised their roles as deicides. Further anti-Catholicism, with the Pope as antichrist, came to replace antisemitism. The period of the English Civil Wars and Interregnum was marked by both widespread millennial beliefs and a beginning of religious tolerance. Significantly, millenarianism in England often had a strong Hebraist character, that emphasised the study of Hebrew and Judaism. This was sometimes extended by certain individuals to claim the English as the descendants of the Ten lost tribes of Israel, with Cromwell himself numbering amongst the supporters of this idea.

After both the Alhambra Decree of 1492, which expelled Jews from Spain in 1492, and similar measures in Portugal in 1496, some converso traders (Jewish converts to Christianity, who often practised Judaism in secret, sometimes also known as New Christians or derogatively as Marranos) settled in London and Bristol. (Note: In addition to these small communities of 'port Jews', Henry VIII consulted rabbis on the biblical legitimacy of his divorce from Catherine of Aragon, and during the reign of Edward VI the Regius professor of Hebrew at Cambridge was the converso Hebraist Immanuel Tremellius. Elizabeth had a Jewish physician, Roderigo Lopes, and her spymaster Francis Walsingham's network of intelligencers included the Portuguese Marrano traders, Hector Nuñes and Dunstan Añez, as well as Lopes. Further, Sir Walter Raleigh travelled to the New World with Jewish mining expert Joachim Gans in 1584. It is estimated that there were roughly 80 to 90 Portuguese converses in Elizabethan London.) The small community was largely linked by trade to Antwerp, and was expelled altogether in 1609. It was with London's growing importance as a trading city that Jews from the Netherlands began to settle in the country once more from the 1630s. It is from this first that the current Jewish population of the UK has grown.

=== Religious toleration and liberty of conscience ===
The 1640s and 1650s in England were marked by intense debates about religious tolerance, marked by speeches and tracts by radical puritans and dissenters who called for liberty of conscience. This extreme diversity of opinion about religious toleration was sorted into 12 schools of thought in the study of the period by W.K. Jordan. (Note: These categories were: orthodox Presbyterians, moderate Presbyterians, Independents, Baptists, Latitudinarians, Cambridge Platonists, rationalists and sceptics, Erastians, the rank and file, Anglican extremists, moderate Anglicans, and Roman Catholics.) John Coffey uses a simpler three-point schema: anti-tolerationists, conservative tolerationists, and radical tolerationists, pointing out that although the latter were in a minority, they formed an important part of the debate. Nonetheless it is important to remember that although figures such as William Walwyn, Henry Vane, John Milton, and others made powerful apologia for religious toleration, their frame of reference was theological, rather than secular in nature and they were not calling for religious pluralism as is understood today. The early and mid Seventeenth century was also marked by a rise in Hebraism, the study of Jewish scriptures, which were often used to discuss political issues such as the existence of a monarchy or republic, and religious toleration. This debate used Jewish sources to justify its conclusions. The most prominent scholar in the field was the MP and jurist John Selden, whose thought was influenced by Thomas Erastus and Grotius. Selden proposed minimal government intervention on matters of religion, a view he modelled on the Hebrew Commonwealth. He in turn influenced similar approaches in John Milton (whose plea for freedom of the press, the Areopagitica (1644), directly named him), Thomas Hobbes and James Harrington (the latter of whom proposed settling Jews in Ireland in his book The Commonwealth of Oceana).

Overall the strongest political group of the 1640s and '50s, the English Puritans, had a negative view of toleration, seeing it as a concession to evil and heresy. It was often associated with tolerating the heresies of Arminianism, the philosophy of free will and free thought, and Socinianism, a doctrine of Anti-trinitarianism. But despite this Puritan hostility to toleration, England did see a certain religious laissez-faire emerge (for instance, the Rump Parliament repealed the recusancy laws in 1650). This was partly due to the impossibility of stopping religious free expression, but it also became a part of the cause of the new model army. The doctrinal policies of the protectorate were largely conservative. However, this Puritan train of thought could also point towards liberty of conscience. For Congregationalists, truth lay in the spirit rather than institutions. Like the Platonists, they searched for internal unity amidst external diversity. Further, Puritans valued conscience, which could be neither forced nor tested, over ritual and ceremony. So rather than toleration, the key debate among key figures in the Protectorate revolved around liberty of conscience. For Blair Worden, Cromwell's religious policy was rooted in a search for union of believers, rather than toleration of differing beliefs, and religious persecution was the largest obstacle to this union. However, liberty of conscience extended only to "God's peculiar" and not heretics (such as Quakers, Socinians, and Ranters).

There was a great increase of religious freedom and the ecclesiastical diversity in Cromwellian England. This marked a revolutionary change and led to increasing toleration in the years after the interregnum ended. On the one hand, the loosely Calvinist Cromwell allowed the punishment of men such as the Unitarian John Biddle and the Quaker James Nayler, and accepted the restrictions on religious tolerance found in the Humble Petition and Advice of 1657. But on the other hand, his entourage included men who wanted more liberty of belief than he allowed. These non-sectarian 'merciful men' or politiques, who wanted to understand and tolerate beliefs different to their own, included Bulstrode Whitelocke, Matthew Hale, and Sir Charles Worsley.

=== Millenarian 'admissionists' ===
The toleration of Jews was largely borne by the hope of converting them to Christianity. Leonard Busher was one of the first to call for the readmission of the Jews to England and the toleration of their faith in 1616. Lawyer and MP, Henry Finch and the scholar Joseph Mede both wrote of the benefits of the conversion of the Jews in the 1620s. The Scottish minister John Wemyss advocated readmitting Jews to Christian lands with a view to converting them in the 1630s. So, by the 1640s, the imminent conversion of the Jews was a widespread belief among Puritans. Indeed during that decade the Christians who were most liberal towards Jews are also those who were most committed to their conversion. A number of these 'admissionists' were close to Cromwell, including John Sadler, John Dury, and Hugh Peter. Other notable readmissionists include exiled Royalist cleric Thomas Barlow and the Dissenter Henry Jessey. The Fifth Monarchy Men were another example of Puritan millenarians who saw the readmission of the Jews as hastening the kingdom of Christ. The exiled Royalist Sir Edward Nicholas is one of the few admissionists who did not seem interested in conversion. By contrast, the anti-admissionists were often animated by the belief that it would be difficult or impossible to convert the Jews. William Prynne's anti-Semitic pamphlet A Short Demurrer, which was printed on the eve of the Whitehall Conference, and the pamphlet Anglo-Judaeus or The History of the Jews Whilst Here in England by W.H. both doubt that the Jews would be converted once in England. Many millenarians at the time emphasised the chosen role of England in God's plan, and this was often accompanied by the identification the Jews as the true Israel of the Bible. Indeed, they saw the Jews as a superior group, sharing some characteristics with the chosen nation of England. This belief was rooted in the literal interpretation of the Biblical primacy of the Jews found in the writings of Thomas Brightman. This meant that if the Jews were specially favoured by God, the English must listen to their appeals for help. These philo-semitic figures, who also believed in the restoration of the Jews to the Holy Land, included Jeremiah Burroughs, Peter Bulkeley (whose father had given Brightman's funeral sermon), John Fenwicke, and John Cotton.

== 1649 to 1654: First steps towards resettlement ==
The original petition for readmission was submitted by Johanna and Ebenezer Cartwright, two English baptists living in Amsterdam, to Thomas Fairfax's Council of War in January 1649. As well as asking that Jews be allowed to live in England, their petition also expressed the wish that the Jews "shall come to know the Emanuell" and that they be transported to the "Land promised to their fore-fathers". It can be seen as a distillation of the Judeo-centric trends of Puritan thought that had developed over the previous century since John Bale (1495–1563). However, the petition was sent the day before the high court was established to try Charles I, so in the ensuing turmoil the Cartwrights never received an answer. The following year Amsterdam-based Rabbi and diplomat Menasseh Ben Israel wrote in his book Hope of Israel of the necessity of the Jews being "spread out to the ends of the earth" (Daniel 12:7) before they could be redeemed. The book was originally published in Dutch and Latin in 1650, and then in English (dedicated to Parliament and the Council of State) in 1652. In 1651 Ben Israel met Oliver St John and his envoys on their mission to secure an Anglo-Dutch coalition. The English were impressed by learning and manner, and advised him to formally apply for Jewish readmission to England.

In 1653, at Oliver St John's suggestion, Cromwell issued an official directive to authorise, "Menasseh ben Israel, a rabbi of the Jewish nation, well respected for his learning and good affection to the State, to come from Amsterdam to these parts." Fearing local anti-English opinion so soon after war, ben Israel turned down the invitation. But by the middle of the decade, Cromwell was taking advice from Marrano trader Simon de Caceres. At de Caceres' suggestion, Cromwell dispatched Marrano physician Abraham de Mercado and his son Raphael to Barbados (which a few years previously had already started admitting Jews escaping from the Portuguese reconquest of Dutch Brazil), where he explored the possibility of Jews setting in Jamaica. There they would be offered full civil rights and even land grants.

There is some difference of opinion as to Oliver Cromwell's opinions regarding the readmission of the Jews. It has been pointed out that he held many of the same hopes regarding the readmission and conversion of the Jews as the millenarians. Paul Rycaut, later ambassador to the port of Smyrna recalled the Whitehall Conference, "When they all met, he (Cromwell) ordered the Jews to speak for themselves. After that he turned to the clergy, who inveigled much against the Jews as a cruel and cursed people. Cromwell in his answer to the Clergy called them 'Men of God' and desired to be informed by the whether it was not their opinion that the Jews were one day to be called into the Church? He then desired to know whether it was not every Christian man's duty to forward that good end all he could?… was it not then our duty… to encourage them to settle ere where they could be taught the thuth…[sic]" It has also been pointed out that Cromwell held more practical beliefs. Cromwell believed that Jews could be used as skilled purveyors of foreign intelligence (which would assist his territorial ambitions). Further, toleration of Protestant sects made political sense for Cromwell as it prevented disorder and promoted harmony. He justified the readmission of the Jews using this same tolerant approach, as well as believing that it would improve trade (he saw the Jews as an important part of Amsterdam's financial success).

Competition with the Dutch for trade and the increasingly protectionist commercial policy that led to the Navigation Act in October 1651 made Oliver Cromwell want to attract the rich Jews of Amsterdam to London so that they might transfer their important trade interests with the Spanish Main from the Netherlands to England. The mission of Oliver St John to Amsterdam, though failing to establish a coalition between English and Dutch commercial interests as an alternative to the Navigation Act, had negotiated with Menasseh Ben Israel and the Amsterdam community. A pass was granted to Menasseh to enter England, but he was unable to use it because of the First Anglo-Dutch War, which lasted from 1652 to 1654.

== 1655 and 1656: Informal resettlement achieved ==
The years 1655 and 1656 were to prove decisive in the history of the resettlement of the Jews in England. The first of these was the visit of Menasseh ben Israel and the second was the case of the Marrano trader Antonio Rodrigues Robles.

=== Menasseh Ben Israel's petition ===
Menasseh ben Israel's son Samuel had arrived in England accompanied by trader David Dormido in 1653 to investigate the possibility of the resettlement of the Jews. In May 1655, he was sent back to Amsterdam in order to try to convince his father to visit England. The rabbi came to England in September 1655 with three other local rabbis, where they were lodged as guests of Cromwell. There he printed his "humble address" to Cromwell. (Note: ben Israel's petition was titled 'To His Highness the Lord Protector of the Commonwealth of England, Scotland, and Ireland, the Humble Addresses of Menasseh ben Israel, a Divine, and Doctor of Physick, in behalf of the Jewish Nation'. The document argued that the Jews contribute to the wealth of the nations in which they dwell and are loyal to their host's rulers. Further the negative accounts of the Jews are untrue. He concluded by asking for the Jews to be allowed to settle in the commonwealth.) (When ben Israel began his stay in London it is reckoned that there were about 20 New Christian families living in the city.) As a consequence, a national conference was summoned at Whitehall in the early part of December, which included some of the most eminent lawyers, clergymen, and merchants in the country. The lawyers declared no opposition to the Jews' residing in England, but both the clergymen and merchants were opposed to readmission, leading Cromwell to stop the discussion to prevent an adverse decision. (Note: Judges John Glynne and William Steele declared that "there was no law which forbade the Jews' return to England" because their original expulsion had been by royal decree, rather than parliamentary vote.) Nonetheless, some change to official policy must have occurred, because the diarist John Evelyn wrote in his diary on 14 December, "Now were the Jews admitted". (Note: John Evelyn's diary entry for 14 December 1655. I visited Mr. Hobbes, the famous philosopher of Malmesbury, with who I had been long acquainted in France. Now were the Jews admitted.) Ben Israel stayed in England until September 1657, during which time he met and engaged with a number of influential people. Although he did not achieve a legal ruling on the resettlement of the Jews, his presence gave prominent Englishmen a positive impression of learning and virtue among Jews.

=== The Robles case ===
Early in the following year (1656), the question came to a practical issue through the declaration of war against Spain, which resulted in the arrest of Antonio Rodrigues Robles, one of the community of Iberian New Christians who traded between London and the Canary Islands. Robles petitioned for the return of his seized property on account of his being 'of the Hebrew nation' rather than Spanish. At the same time six leading members of the New Christian community petitioned Cromwell for permission to gather to worship and acquire a burial ground. Although no formal permission was granted, some assurances must have been given because in the summer Menasseh asked for the Torah scroll to be sent over from Amsterdam, and in the autumn Moses Athias moved from Hamburg to act as religious preceptor. By December 1656 they had rented a house for use as a synagogue, and services began in January of 1657. In February of 1657 the new community, represented by Antonio Fernandez Carvajal and Simon de Caceres, acquired land near Mile End for use as a Synagogue. Historian Todd Endelman makes the point that it is unlikely this activity could have happened without Cromwell's permission that they could live as professing Jews. The informal nature of the resettlement also meant the forces ranged against it had no target and never united to form any significant opposition. Further, at a later date it meant there were no restrictive laws to repeal when Jews wanted fuller citizenship rights. By the end of the decade the number of Jewish families had risen to thirty five. In 1657 Solomon Dormido, a nephew of Menasseh Ben Israel, was admitted to the Royal Exchange as a duly licensed broker of the City of London, without taking the usual oath involving a statement of faith in Christianity (when he was finally sworn in in 1668, the oath was changed for him). Carvajal had previously been granted letters of denization for himself and his son, which guaranteed certain rights of citizenship.

== Debating the return of the Jews ==
During the years 1655–56 the question of the return of Jews to England was fought in a pamphlet war. Conservative opponents including William Prynne opposed the return while the Quaker Margaret Fell was in favour. Christian supporters believed the conversion of Jews was a sign of the end times and the readmission to England was a step towards that goal.

This method of debate had the advantage of not raising antisemitic feelings too strongly; and it likewise enabled Charles II, on his Restoration in 1660, to avoid taking any action on the petition of the merchants of London asking him to revoke Cromwell's concession. He had been assisted during his exile by several Jews of royalist sympathies, such as Andrea Mendes da Costa (Chamberlain of Catherine of Braganza, wife of Charles II), Antonio Mendes (the physician brother of Andrea, who had cured Catherine of erysipelas while in Portugal) and Augustine Coronel-Chacon. In 1664 a further attempt was made by the Earl of Berkshire and Paul Ricaut to bring about the expulsion of the Jews, but the King-in-Council assured the latter of the continuance of former favour. Similar appeals to prejudice were made in 1673, when Jews, for meeting in Duke's Place for a religious service, were indicted on a charge of rioting, and in 1685, when thirty-seven were arrested on the Royal Exchange; but the proceedings in both cases were put a stop to by direction of the Privy Council. The status of the Jews was still very indeterminate, with the Attorney-General declaring that they resided in England only under an implied licence. As a matter of fact, the majority of them were still legally aliens and liable to all the disabilities that condition carried with it.

== Help from and to Jews abroad ==
William III is reported to have been assisted in his ascent to the English throne by a loan of 2,000,000 guilders from Francisco Lopes Suasso (1614–1685) (of the well-known Lopes Suasso family), later made first Baron d'Avernas le Gras by Charles II of Spain. William did not interfere when in 1689 some of the chief Jewish merchants of London were forced to pay the duty levied on the goods of aliens, but he refused a petition from Jamaica to expel the Jews. William's reign brought about a closer connection between the predominantly Sephardic communities of London and Amsterdam; this aided in the transfer of the European finance centre from the Dutch capital to the English capital. Over this time a small German Ashkenazi community had arrived and established their own synagogue in 1692, but they were of little mercantile consequence, and did not figure in the relations between the established Jewish community and the government. One of the rabbis was Solomon Ayllon.

Early in the eighteenth century the Jewish community of London comprised representatives of the chief Jewish financiers in northern Europe; these included the Mendez da Costa, Abudiente (later known as Gideon and Eardley), Salvador, Lopez, Fonseca, and Seixas families. The utility of these prominent Jewish merchants and financiers was widely recognised. Marlborough in particular made great use of the services of Sir Solomon de Medina, and indeed was publicly charged with taking an annual subvention from him. The early merchants of the resettlement are estimated to have brought with them a capital of £1,500,000 into the country; this amount is estimated to have increased to £5,000,000 by the middle of the 18th century.

As early as 1723 an act of Parliament, the Papists Act 1723 (10 Geo. 1. c. 4), allowed Jews holding land to omit the words "on the true faith of a Christian", when registering their title. Only once more would this allowance be made in the passage of the Plantation Act 1740, but more significantly the act allowed Jews who had or would have resided in British America for seven years to become naturalised British subjects.

Shortly afterwards a similar bill was introduced into the Irish Parliament, where it passed the Commons in 1745 and 1746, but failed to pass the Lords in 1747; it was ultimately dropped. Meanwhile, during the Jacobite rising of 1745, the Jews had shown particular loyalty to the government. Their chief financier, Samson Gideon, had strengthened the stock market, and several of the younger members had volunteered in the corps raised to defend London.

== In popular culture ==
The meeting between Menasseh Ben Israel and Oliver Cromwell was painted by Solomon Alexander Hart in 1873 and bought by Sir Francis Goldsmid. The historical figure of Menasseh Ben Israel and the admission of Sephardic Jews from the Netherlands into England are featured in the novel The Weight of Ink by Rachel Kadish (Boston: Houghton Mifflin Harcourt, 2017).

== See also ==
- History of the Jews in England
- History of the Jews in England (1066–1200)
- History of the Marranos in England
- Jewish Naturalization Act 1753
- Influences on the standing of the Jews in England
- Emancipation of the Jews in England
- Early English Jewish literature
- History of the Jews in Scotland
