= Nathaniel Crouch =

Nathaniel Crouch (born c. 1632) was an English printer and bookseller, and under the pseudonym Robert or Richard Burton (sometimes, R.B.) wrote historical books as well. As a historian, he is considered a hack, borrowing material from other books and rewriting them under his pseudonym, then publishing and marketing them under the Crouch imprint. Though he was the type of writer/publisher denounced in the following century by writers such as Samuel Butler (Prose Observations) and Alexander Pope (The Dunciad), more recent assessments of his life and career see him as an important figure in the development of historiography, especially in the popularization of a hitherto high-culture genre of discourse.

Crouch was one of the authors who covered the 1655 Whitehall Conference to consider the resettlement of the Jews in England (the other being Henry Jessey). The report is found in the 1719 edition of his Two Journeys to Jerusalem. It is different from Jessey's version in two respects: firstly it actually names the participants and secondly it includes some antisemitic additions to the conclusions of the conference.

Around September 30, 1681, an unlikely forerunner of Reader's Digest, called Historical Rarities in London and Westminster was first published by Crouch. Robert Chambers' Book of Days (1864) elaborated:

"With probably little education, but something of a natural gift for writing, Crouch had the sagacity to see that the works of the learned, from their form and price, were kept within a narrow circle of readers, while there was a vast multitude outside who were able and willing to read, provided that a literature suited to their means and capacities was supplied to them. He accordingly set himself the task of transfusing large and pompous books into a series of small, cheap volumes, modestly concealing his authorship under his nom de plume. Thus, he produced Surprising Miracles of Nature and Art, and many other treatises on very plain paper, and sold [them] at an exceedingly reasonable rate. His enterprise and diligence were rewarded by large sales and considerable wealth."
