= Novo Cemetery =

Sephardic Jewish cemetery in London

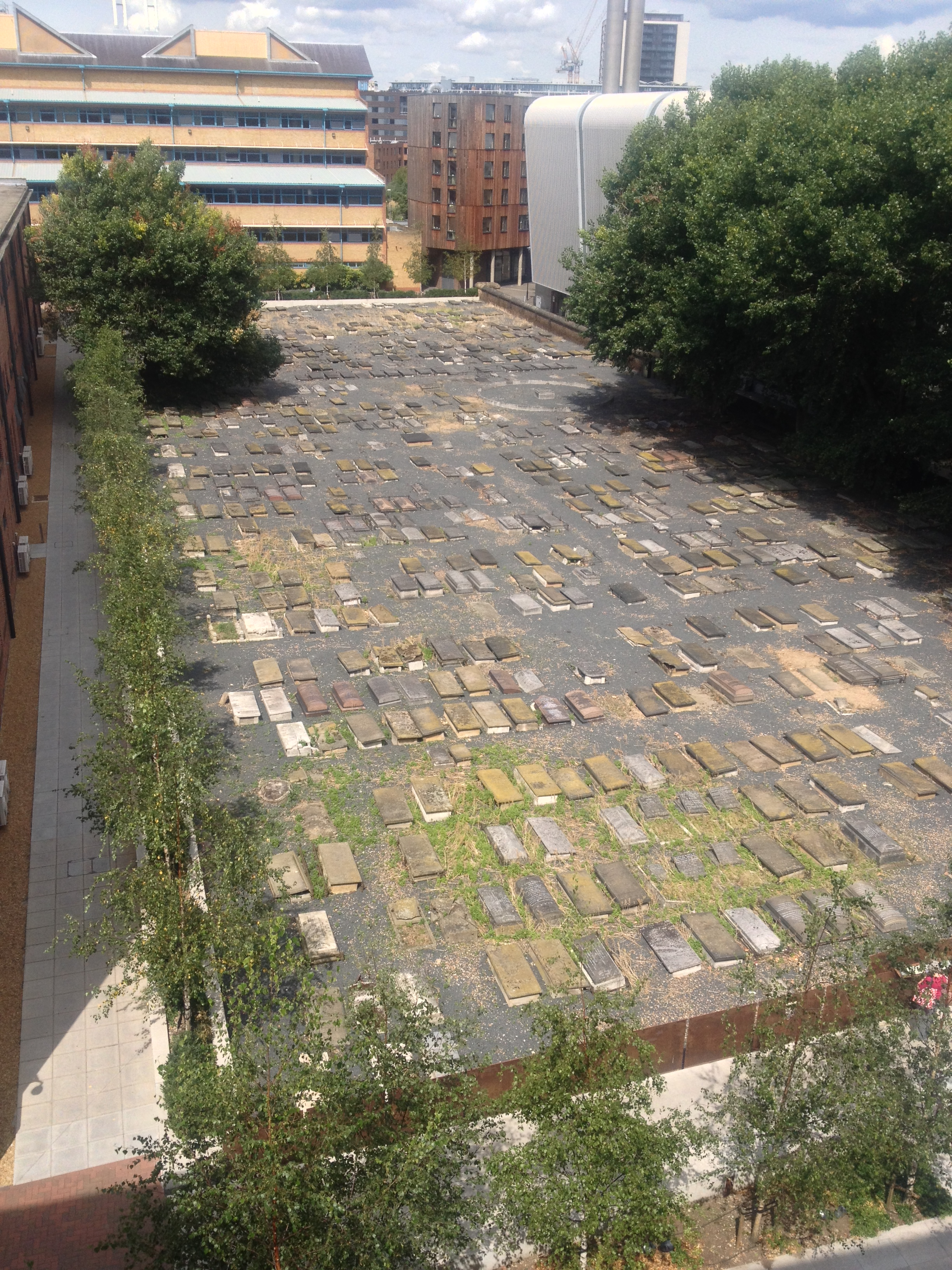
- The Novo Cemetery in 2017

Details
- Established: 1733
- Location: Mile End, London, England, United Kingdom
- Coordinates: 51.524°N 0.038°W
- Type: Sephardic Jewish

Designations

Listed Building – Grade II
- Official name: The Novo Cemetery
- Designated: 11 April 2014
- Reference no.: 1416421

The Novo Cemetery is a Grade II listed Sephardic Jewish cemetery located within the grounds of Queen Mary University of London in Mile End in the London Borough of Tower Hamlets. Opened in 1733, it is one of only two exclusively Sephardic cemeteries left in England.

== History ==
England's first Jewish cemetery, the Velho Cemetery, was built on a small plot of land in Mile End in 1657. As the nearby Jewish community grew in size the Velho began to fill up. By 1726, it was nearly full, so land for a second, larger Sephardi cemetery, the Novo Cemetery, was leased, with the first burials taking place in 1733.

By 1895 the cemetery was almost full, and it was closed for burials for adults in 1905 and for children in 1918. Historic England added it to the register of listed buildings in 2014, as a Grade II.

In 1984, “Seven thousand graves had been removed and reinterred at Brentwood in Essex. The remaining part of the cemetery contains the most recent burials - from 1865 to 1916,” as noted on interpretive signage overlooking the cemetery. Therefore, some of the Notable People below are likely no longer buried here.

In 2012, Seth Stein Architects undertook “a sensitive restoration and landscaping scheme around the perimeter of an 18th century Jewish cemetery,” that includes an extensive set of interpretive panels.

The site includes a low circular memorial marking a portion of the cemetery destroyed by a German bomb dropped on the site during WWII.

== Notable people ==
One of the most notable people buried in the cemetery is the Rabbi and Kabbalist Shalom Buzaglo, also known as the "Mikdash Melech." He was born in Marrakesh, Morocco and raised in southern Morocco, which was then a kabbalistic center. He fled persecution by the sultan and settled in London, where he wrote and published numerous works on kabbalah, including the first systematic commentary on the Zohar.

== Notable interments ==
- Jacob de Castro Sarmento
- Benjamin D'Israeli, grandfather of the later prime minister
- Sampson Gideon
- Daniel Mendoza
- Jacob Levi Montefiore
- Rabbi Benjamin Artom

== See also ==
- List of Jewish cemeteries in London
