= Sampson Gideon =

British banker and philanthropist

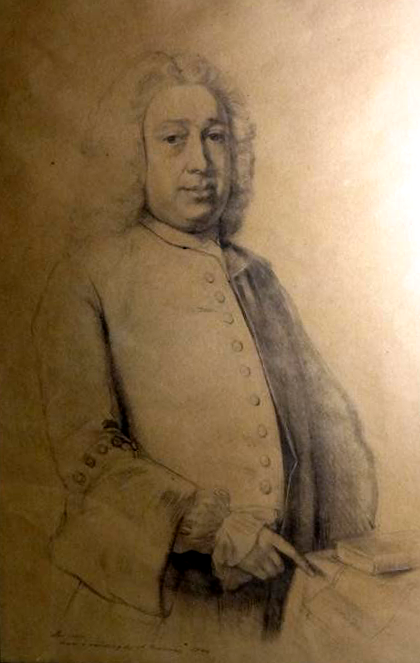
- Portrait by Benjamin Long
- Born: February 1699; London, Middlesex
- Died: 17 October 1762 (aged 63); Erith, Kent
- Other name: Sampson Abudiente
- Occupations: Financier; broker
- Known for: Financing suppression of the Jacobite Rising of 1745

Sampson Gideon (February 1699 – 17 October 1762) was a British banker and philanthropist active in the City of London during the Georgian era. Gideon is most prominently known for his financing of the Hanoverian-Whig government's suppression of the Jacobite rising of 1745, subsequently becoming a trusted "adviser of the Government" who supported the passage of the Jewish Naturalisation Act 1753. Historian James Picciotto, in his 1875 book Sketches of Anglo-Jewish History described Gideon as the "Rothschild of his day" and the "pillar of state credit".

== Background ==
Sampson Gideon was born at London Wall in the City of London, second son of five children of Rowland Gideon (né Rohiel Abudiente), who traded in the West Indies, and his second wife, Esther de Porto (also Jewish), daughter of Domingo (or Abraham) do Porto, a diamond buyer in Madras, India. Sampson Gideon's paternal grandfather Moses Abudiente was a Sephardi born at Lisbon, Portugal, but moved to Glückstadt in Holstein, an area close to Hamburg, where Rowland Gideon was born. The Abudientes (including Rowland and his brother) were part of the elite Sephardic planter ruling class in the West Indies, active in the production of sugar cane in first Barbados, Antigua and then Nevis (moving each time to avoid taxes). The Abudientes made their extensive fortune from the sugar cane, worked by the labour of enslaved Africans and European indentured servants on their plantations.

After moving to London, Rowland Gideon was admitted to the Worshipful Company of Painter-Stainers on 17 February 1698 and was likely the first Jewish Freeman of the City of London. He was admitted to the company due to his Barbados trading connections, through the person of Samuel Swynock, one of the Wardens of the Painter-Stainers. Swynock had been close to Antonio Fernandez Carvajal, one of the Sephardic merchants allied with Oliver Cromwell and the Roundheads. Indeed, Carvajal founded the Creechuch Lane Synagogue where Sampson Gideon's parents were married by Haham Aylion on 26 December 1693. Rowland Gideon himself was the Treasurer of Bevis Marks Synagogue in the year that it was founded. Sampson's siblings included an unknown half-brother who died at Nevis in 1684, as well as three sisters: Bara, Sara and Rahel Abudiente. His brothers-in-law were Simson da Costa Athias (an investor on the London stock market), Jacob Lobatto and Moses Carriao de Paiba.

== Finance ==
Gideon began his career at the age of 20 by speculating in coffee houses on lottery tickets, government securities, and the South Sea company. By the 1730s he was dealing in British, Dutch and French securities, as well as marine insurance. During the War of Austrian Succession (1740 to 1748) he broke through the antisemitic elements in financial circles in the City. He raised money in the Jewish community to help finance the British Army, and became a key advisor to the Pelhams and to the Bank of England on matters of high finance.

Gideon began business in 1720 with capital of £1,500 (worth £276,100 in 2019) inherited from his family, which increased so rapidly that in 1729 he was admitted a sworn broker with a capital of £25,000 (worth £6,670,000 in 2019). His capital rose to £45,000 in 1740, £180,000 in 1750, and £350,000 in 1759. Gideon was involved in financial activities as a broker, a middle-man in the metal trade with the East India Company. He was one of a number of contemporary Sephardic financiers in British public life who specialised in metal brokering, along with Abraham Mocatta.

The Hats government in Sweden (controlled by pro-Jacobite freemasons) had invited Sephardic Jews in Britain to join the Swedish East India Company, which also included a number of Scotsmen who were members of Masonic lodges. The British government then encouraged pro-Hanoverian Freemasons Joseph Salvador and Sampson Gideon to entice influential Scots to join the East India Company to undermine the Swedish-based Jacobite masonry.

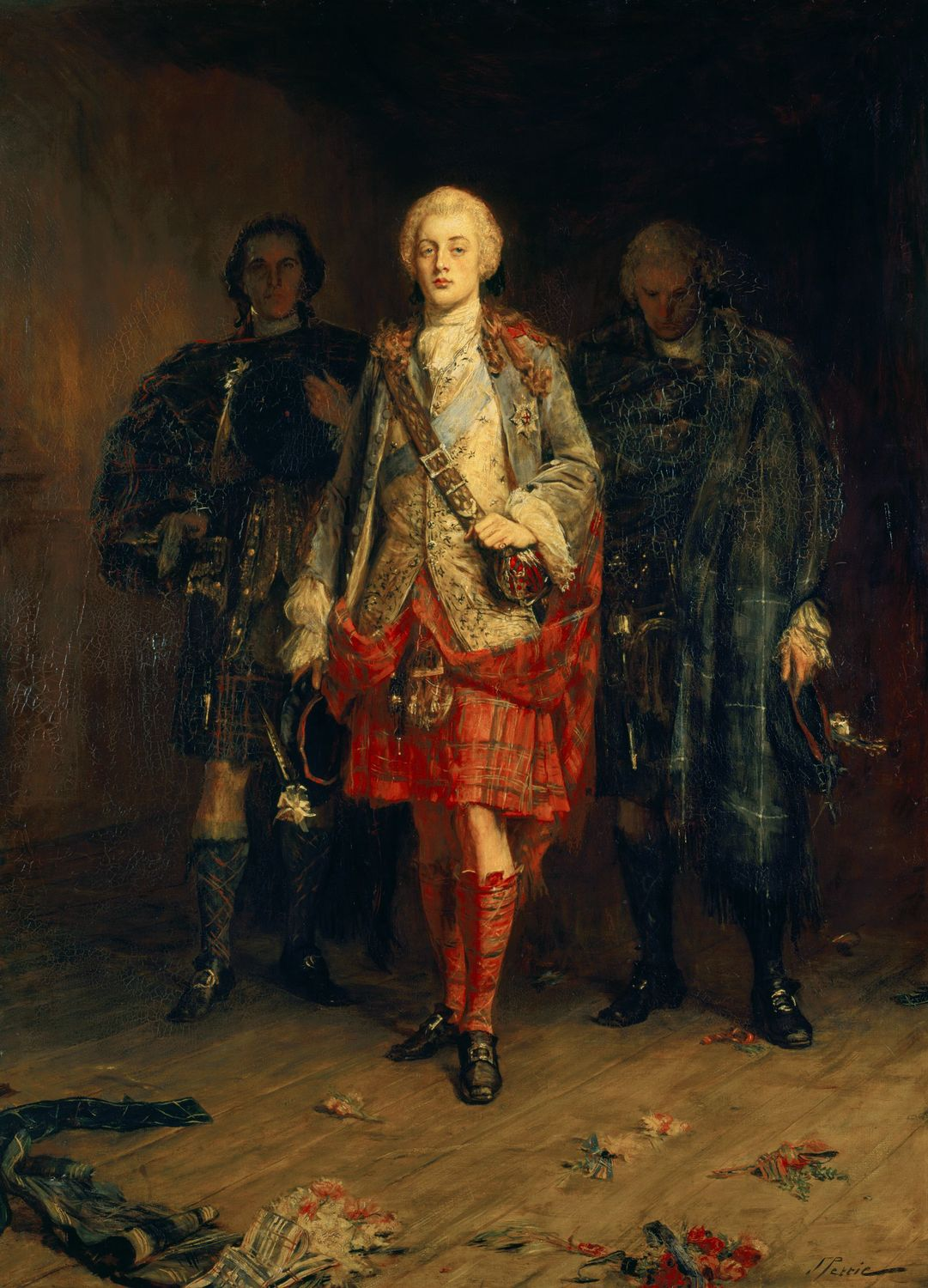
Charles Edward Stuart. Gideon financially backed the Whig regime against the Jacobites.

Sampson Gideon was able to successfully navigate the South Sea Company bubble, which bankrupted many prominent people in Britain (James Picciotto in his Sketches of Anglo-Jewish History states that no "Hebrew" name is to be found on the list of insolvencies). Gideon offered his services, both private and political, to Robert Walpole and his ruling Whig government under the new Hanoverian monarchy. The first major conflict that he helped to finance was the War of Jenkins' Ear against Spain. The Spanish Inquisition, which persecuted Jews, was still active, and many of the Sephardi traders in the West Indies consequently viewed the Spanish cause in the conflict as a potential threat to their trade interests.

Gideon's most significant act came during the Jacobite rising of 1745 during the War of the Austrian Succession, when he provided assistance to the sitting Whig-Hanoverian regime against Charles Edward Stuart (the Young Pretender) and the Jacobites who were attempting to restore the Stuart monarchy, with the help of their Bourbon French allies. When the Young Pretender landed on the west coast of Scotland in July 1745, there was panic in London as most of the British Army was engaged on the European Continent at the time. Consequently, there was a run on the banks, which was especially problematic for the Bank of England. This hit the finances of the coalition government hard under the Pelham Ministry. False rumours abounded among the common people that the Duke of Newcastle, a Secretary of State, had fled the country—he was forced to show himself publicly outside Newcastle House. When many were selling, Gideon calmly purchased as many government securities as he could at rock-bottom prices, and backed up the Bank of England. Gideon advised the government in the issuing of a loan, taking a significant amount of it himself. This stabilised the situation, and by the time the Jacobite advance into England had been halted before it reached London and forced to retreat back to Scotland, Gideon had doubled his wealth. The Whig political class under the Pelhams and the Hanoverian monarchy reigned supreme and owed a significant part of their position to Gideon's calm actions and financial activities.

== Politics ==
Gideon was ambitious and wished to found a dynasty with vast landed estate interests in England (as the Rothschild family would go on to successfully achieve in the next century). However, it was not entirely clear whether Jews could legally own property in England. Jews had gradually begun to resettle in England during the times of Cromwell, having been barred from the country since the Edict of Expulsion at the close of the 13th century. In the previous century, Gideon's fellow Sephardi, Antonio Fernandez Carvajal, had become the first endenizened Jew. However, following the English Reformation, those who did not conform to the Church of England (including English Dissenters and Catholics, as well as Jews) could not hold office, be called to the bar, obtain a naval commission, study for a university degree or vote in elections. There were additional commercial restrictions on endenizened Jews and they had to have the approval of the British parliament to own real estate. As Sampson Gideon and Joseph Salvador had provided a useful service to the Hanoverian-Whig regime against their rivals, they were confident enough to lobby Henry Pelham to introduce the Jewish Naturalisation Act 1753 to Parliament. Jews and Dissenters in British America had already achieved naturalisation through the Plantation Act 1740 (this was not extended to Catholics).

== Personal life ==
In the 1740s, he married Jane Ermell (died 1778), the daughter of Charles Ermell, with whom he had three children. The elder Sampson had lobbied for a baronetcy for himself from the then Prime Minister, the Duke of Newcastle, but was denied it on account of his own religion, as he remained a practising Jew. Their son and two daughters, with a Christian mother, were baptised and brought up in the Church of England, so the government instead conferred a baronetcy on his 14-year old son, Sampson Gideon, who was educated at Eton College, and created a Baronet in 1759 and Baron Eardley of Spalding in 1789. His daughter Elizabeth married in 1757 William Gage, 2nd Viscount Gage.

== Death ==
Gideon died of dropsy at Belvedere House, near Erith, Kent, in October 1762, aged 63, having a gained a fortune recorded as £350,000 (equivalent to $62 million in 2025). He left £1000 to the Sephardi Jewish congregation in London on condition he was buried with honour as a married man in their cemetery in Mile End. (He did not marry a Jew, which under Jewish law precludes recognition as a married man).

In 2005, the Bexley Civic Society restored a memorial to Sampson Gideon, located in the grounds of All Saints Church, Belvedere, and produced a plaque bearing a brief history of his life. The plaque reads:

This memorial commemorates the life of Sampson Gideon (1699–1762) sometime owner of Belvedere House, and father of Lord Eardley. A financier of nationwide renown, he is believed to have been a founder of the London Stock Exchange. Such was his reputation that the British government resorted both to his wealth and advice to underwrite the national debt, and finance the army during the Jacobite Rebellion of 1745 and the Seven Years' War of 1756–63. Amongst his descendants can be numbered Hugh Childers, Gladstone's Chancellor in his 1880–1885 ministry and Erskine Childers, Irish patriot and author of 'The Riddle of the Sands'. Another descendant Sir Culling Eardley was responsible for the building of this church.

== See also ==
- History of the Jews in England
