= Jewish Naturalisation Act 1753 =

Act of the Parliament of Great Britain

Naturalization of Jews Act 1753
- Act of Parliament
- Parliament of Great Britain
- Long title: An Act to permit Persons professing the Jewish Religion to be naturalized by Parliament; and for other Purposes therein mentioned.
- Citation: 26 Geo. 2. c. 26
- Territorial extent: Great Britain

Dates
- Royal assent: 7 July 1753
- Commencement: 11 January 1753 (Note: Start of session.)
- Repealed: 20 December 1753
Other legislation
Repealed by	Naturalization of Jews Act 1754
Relates to	Naturalisation and Restoration of Blood Act 1609; Naturalization Act 1739

Status: Repealed

Text of statute as originally enacted

Naturalization of Jews Act 1754
- Act of Parliament
- Parliament of Great Britain
- Long title: An Act to repeal an Act of the Twenty-sixth Year of His Majesty's Reign, intituled, "An Act to permit Persons professing the Jewish Religion to be naturalized by Parliament; and for other Purposes therein mentioned."
- Citation: 27 Geo. 2. c. 1
- Territorial extent: Great Britain

Dates
- Royal assent: 20 December 1753
- Commencement: 15 November 1753
- Repealed: 15 July 1867
Other legislation
Repeals/revokes	Naturalization of Jews Act 1753
Repealed by	Statute Law Revision Act 1867

Status: Repealed

Text of statute as originally enacted

The Jewish Naturalisation Act 1753 (26 Geo. 2. c. 26) was an Act of Parliament (United Kingdom) of the Parliament of Great Britain which allowed Jews resident in Britain to become naturalised by application to Parliament. It received royal assent on 7 July 1753 but was repealed in 1754 by the Naturalization of Jews Act 1754 (27 Geo. 2. c. 1) due to widespread opposition to its provisions.

== History ==
During the Jacobite rising of 1745, the Jews had shown particular loyalty to the government. Their chief financier, Sampson Gideon, had strengthened the stock market, and several of the younger members had volunteered in the corps raised to defend London. Possibly as a reward, Henry Pelham in 1753 brought in the Jew Bill of 1753, which allowed Jews to become naturalised by application to Parliament. It passed the Lords without much opposition, but on being brought down to the House of Commons, the Tories made protest against what they deemed an "abandonment of Christianity." The Whigs, however, persisted in carrying out at least one part of their general policy of religious toleration, and the bill was passed and received royal assent (26 Geo. 2. c. 26). The public reacted with an enormous outburst of antisemitism, and the Bill was repealed in the next sitting of Parliament, in 1754.

Within the Bedfordite press, the opposition weekly The Protester campaigned against the bill during its 1753 run.

Horace Walpole, a contemporary observer, said that the Act removed "such absurd distinctions, as stigmatized and shackled a body of the most loyal, commercial and wealthy subjects of the kingdom"; the affair demonstrated that "the age, enlightened as it is called, was still enslaved to the grossest and most vulgar prejudices". The political economist Josiah Tucker defended the Act in A Letter to A Friend Concerning Naturalizations (1753), where he pointed to the economic benefits of granting naturalisation to Jewish people:

As to the Bill itself, it only empowers rich Foreigners to purchase Lands, and to carry on a free and extensive Commerce, by importing all Sorts of Merchandise and Raw Materials, allowed by Law to be imported, for the Employment of our own People, and then Exporting the Surplus of the Produce, Labour, and Manufactures of our own Country, upon cheaper and better Terms than is done at present. This is all the Hurt that such a Bill can do.

== See also ==
- History of the Jews in England
- History of the Jews in England (1066–1290)
- Edict of Expulsion
- History of the Marranos in England
- Resettlement of the Jews in England
  - Menasseh Ben Israel (1604–1657)
- Emancipation of the Jews in the United Kingdom
- Early English Jewish literature
- Rothschild family
- History of the Jews in Scotland
