= Alderney Road Cemetery =

Jewish cemetery in Tower Hamlets, London, England

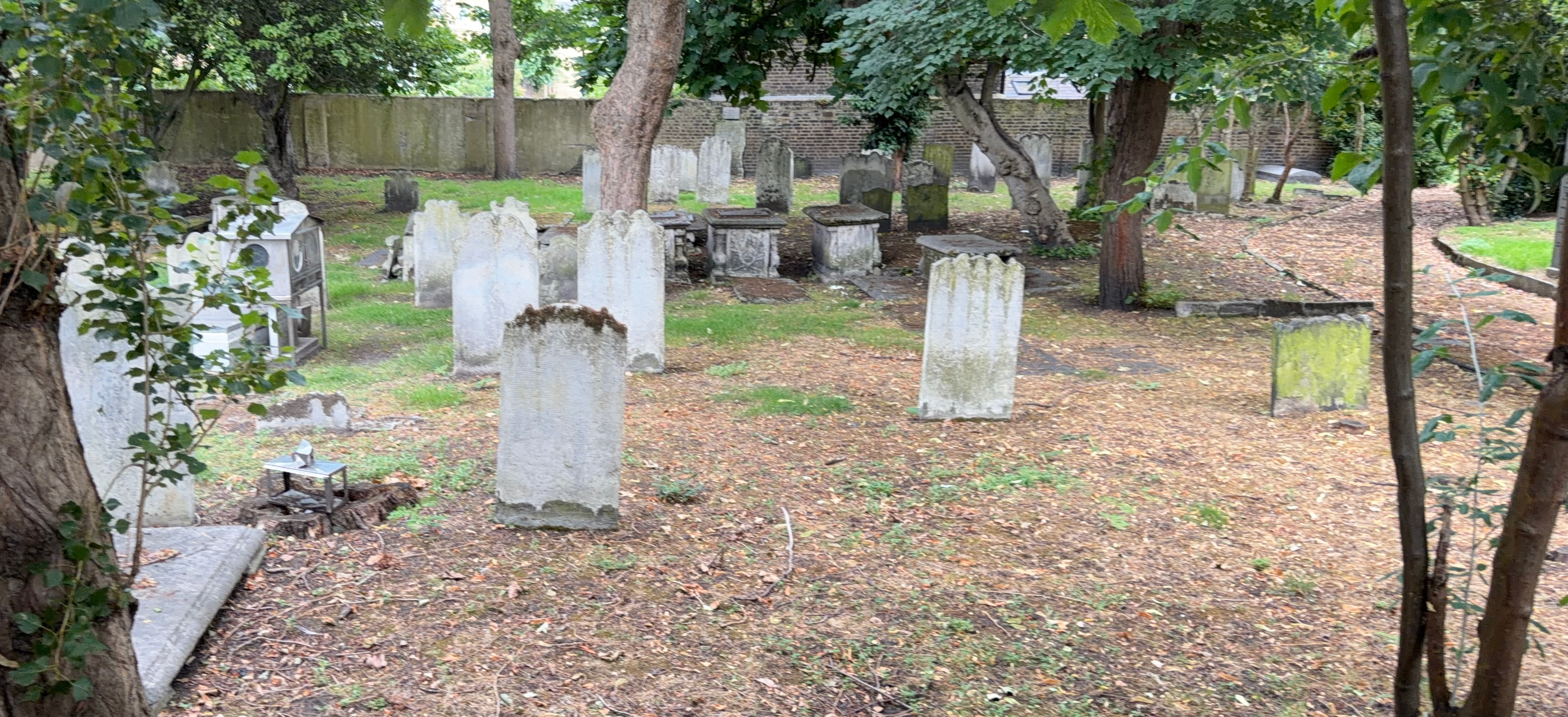
- Graves at Alderney Road Cemetery
- Interactive map of Alderney Road Cemetery

Details
- Established: 1697
- Location: London
- Country: England, UK
- Coordinates: 51.522731°N 0.045463°W
- Type: Jewish
- Find a Grave: Alderney Road Cemetery

The Alderney Road Cemetery is a historic Jewish cemetery in London, the capital city of the United Kingdom. It is the oldest surviving cemetery in the UK established primarily for the Ashkenazi Jewish community. It is also adjacent to (but separate from) Velho Cemetery.

== History ==
The cemetery was established by the Ashkenazi community in 1697, expanded in 1749, and closed in 1852. It is the second oldest Jewish cemetery in London and the oldest Ashkenazi cemetery in the United Kingdom. The cemetery is located in Mile End in the London Borough of Tower Hamlets.

The cemetery is listed at Grade II by Historic England.

== Notable burials ==
- Aaron Hart (born 1670 in Breslau; died 1756), Chief Rabbi
- Samuel Jacob Falk (d. 1782), rabbi
- David Tevele Schiff (born in Frankfurt am Main; died 1791), Chief Rabbi

== Literary reception ==
W. G. Sebald describes the cemetery in his novel Austerlitz because Austerlitz, the main character of the novel, lives in the neighbouring house.

== Literature ==
- Louis Berk: East End Jewish Cemeteries: Brady Street and Alderney Road. (nicht ausgewertet)
- W. G. Sebald: Austerlitz. Carl Hanser Verlag, München 2001, ISBN 3-446-19986-1, S. 410–411. (mit Foto)
- Hugh Meller: London Cemeteries. An Illustrated Guide and Gazetteer. 2. Auflage. Gregg International, Godstone, Surrey 1985, ISBN 0-576-05010-5, S. 166.
- Beschreibung bei International Jewish Cemetery Project (English, dort auch weitere Weblinks)
- Grabinschriften des Friedhofs bei www.jewishgen.org (English)

== See also ==
- List of Jewish cemeteries in London
