= Shalom Buzaglo =

Moroccan Kabbalist

Religious life
- Religion: Judaism

Shalom Ben Moses Buzaglo (Hebrew: בוזאגלו, שלום בן משה) (also Buzagli, Buzaglio) (c. 1700 – 1780) was a Moroccan kabbalist born in Marrakesh and filling the position of Dayan (rabbinic judge). Owing to voyages in the Orient made in his capacity of collector of alms for the relief of the poor in Ottoman-controlled Palestine, he became acquainted with the chief Kabbalists of the period. He also visited Europe, and sojourned for some time in London. He was tortured by the Sultan and left for England in 1745, where he remained until his death.

Although his Kabbalistic works bear his name on the title-page, they are merely compilations of teachings attributed to Isaac Luria and Hayyim ben Joseph Vital. It has been stated that Buzaglo took part in the discussion, which arose among many Kabbalists, as to whether Jews should be allowed to undergo vaccination, which had been discovered shortly before that day. Buzaglo pronounced himself in favor of vaccination, but disputed the priority of Jenner in regard to its discovery. However, recent scholarship disputes any discussion by Buzaglo regarding Jenner.

== Published works ==
1. Miḳdash Melek (The Sanctuary of the King), a commentary on the Zohar, published by Meldola (4 vols., Amsterdam, 1750); This work draws upon three earlier commentaries as well as teachings from Lurianic Kabbalah.
2. Hadrat Melek (The Beauty of the King), a commentary on the Zohar, compiled from Isaac Luria and Ḥayyim Vital (2 vols., Amsterdam, 1766; London, 1772);
3. Kisse Melek (The Throne of the King), annotations on the Tiḳḳune Zohar (Amsterdam, 1769);
4. Hod Melek (The Majesty of the King), commentary on the book Zeni'uta of the Zohar (London, no date);
5. Sefer ha-Zohar, notes on the Zohar, published together with the text (London, 1772);
6. Kebod Melek (The Honor of the King), a collection of Kabbalistic derashot (London, no date);
7. Ma'aseh she-Hayah Kak-Hayah (What Happened Was in This Fashion), report of the proceedings of a lawsuit (London, 1774);
8. Kunṭras Ma'aseh Adonai Ki Nora Hu (Fascicle on the Work of God, Which Is Majestic), an appeal to the public concerning the authority of Buzaglio's judgment in a lawsuit, in Hebrew and Judæo-German (London, 1774);
9. Tokaḥat le-Shobabim we-Taḳḳanah le-Shabim (Admonition for Transgressors and Rehabilitation for the Repentant), consisting of two letters to Israel Meshullam Solomon, also concerning Buzaglo's lawsuit (London, 1774).

He authored a number of commentaries on Zohar:

- מקדש מלך "Mikdash Melech" – published in Amsterdam in 1750; etc.
- הדרת מלך "Hadrat Melech" – published in Amsterdam 1766; in London 1770; etc.
- כסא מלך "Kiseh Melech" – published in Amsterdam in 1769; etc.
- פני מלך "Pnei Melech" – published in London in 1773; etc. (This is the first systematic commentary on the Zohar to be published.)

He is buried in novo cemetery behind the Queen Mary University of London.

"[His works] were based mainly on Lurianic Kabbalah, including all the scattered work of Isaac Luria's disciples, which Buzaglo usually copied word for word, occasionally quoting other opinions. Although this book does not convey the literal meaning of the Zohar, it has continuing value for scholars." Encyclopaedia Judaica. Scholem, Bib. Kabbalistica, 188:15. Vinograd, Amsterdam, 1633. Zedner 163.
