= Fernando Mendes (physician) =

Portuguese physician (??–1724)

- Born: Beira, Portugal
- Died: 15 November 1724; London
- Occupation: Physician

Fernando Mendes (died 15 November 1724) was a Portuguese Jewish physician.

== Biography ==
Mendes was born of Jewish parentage in the province of Beira, Portugal. He graduated M.D. at Montpellier in December 1667, and became physician to John IV of Portugal. When Catherine of Braganza was on her way to England to become the wife of Charles II, she was attacked during her journey through New Castile with erysipelas, and Mendes was sent to her assistance. He gained such favour with the princess that she made him a member of her household, and desired him to accompany her to England and settle there. Mendes reached this country on 25 October 1669, and was appointed physician in ordinary to the queen. He was one of the many physicians in regular attendance on Charles II in his last illness. By the charter of James II he was created a fellow of the College of Physicians, and was admitted on 12 April 1687, but at the accession of William and Mary his name was removed from the roll. Mendes died in London on 15 Nov. 1724 (Hist. Reg. vol. ix., Chron. Diary, p. 48). He was buried in the Velho Cemetery in Mile End.

By his wife, Miss Marques, he had a son James (d. 1739), and a daughter Catherine (named after the queen, who acted as godmother), born about 1678 in the royal palace of Somerset House (Gent. Mag. 1812, pt. i. p. 22). Moses Mendes, the dramatist, was his grandson.

Mendes's only published work was his thesis for the degree of M.D., entitled ‘Stadium Apollinare, sive Progymnasmata medica, ad Monspeliensis Apollinis Laurum consequendam,’ 4to, Lyons, 1668. Prefixed is his portrait engraved by N. Regnesson. A letter in Portuguese from him to John Mendes da Costa, dated 1663, is among the Additional MSS. in the British Museum (No. 29868, f. i.)
