= History of the Marranos in England =

English Jews forcibly converted to Christianity

The History of Sephardic Jews in England consists of the Sephardic Jews' contribution and achievement in England.

Sephardic Jews were Spanish and Portuguese Jews living in the Iberian Peninsula who converted or were forced to convert to Christianity during the Middle Ages, but continued to practice Judaism in secrecy.

== Arrival of Sephardic Jews ==
Documents suggest that, although small in number at the time, Sephardic Jews fleeing persecution from the Inquisition developed a small community in London around the late 16th century, largely known from contemporary Spanish and Portuguese sources writing about English Catholic ambassadors' repeated complaints of Jews from this community meeting to celebrate Passover and Yom Kippur in London. Toward the middle of the 17th century a considerable number of Sephardic merchants settled in London and formed there a secret congregation, at the head of which was Antonio Fernandez Carvajal. They conducted a large business with the Levant, East and West Indies, Canary Islands, and Brazil, and above all with the Netherlands, Spain, and Portugal. They formed an important link in the network of trade spread, especially throughout the Spanish and Portuguese world by the Sephardi or secret Jews (see Commerce). Their position enabled them to give Cromwell and his secretary, John Thurloe, important information as to the plans both of Charles Stuart in Holland and of the Spaniards in the New World (see L. Wolf, "Cromwell's Secret Intelligencers"). Outwardly they passed as Spaniards and Catholics; but they held prayer-meetings at Creechurch Lane, and became known to the government as Jews by faith.

Creechurch Lane and, later in 1701, the Bevis Marks Synagogue in 1701 become the first Jewish religious places since the Edict of Expulsion of 1290. In the following three centuries, Sephardic Jews communities established near the major European sea ports like Amsterdam and London, helping the Marranos who were expelled from the Spanish Inquisition to rise up new merchant activities.

== Puritans call for the Jews' return ==
Meanwhile, public opinion in England had been prepared by the Puritan movement for a sympathetic treatment of any proposal by the Judaizing sects among the extremists of the Parliamentary party for the readmission of the Jews into England. Petitions favouring readmission had been presented to the army as early as 1649 by two Baptists of Amsterdam, Johanna Cartwright and her son Ebenezer ("The Petition of the Jews for the Repealing of the Act of Parliament for Their Banishment out of England"); and suggestions looking to that end were made by men of the type of Roger Williams, Hugh Peters, and by Independents generally. Many were moved in the same direction by mystical Messianic reasons; and their views attracted the enthusiasm of Menasseh Ben Israel, who in 1650 published his Hope of Israel, in which he advocated the return as a preliminary to the appearance of the Messiah. The Messiah could not appear till Jews existed in all the lands of the earth. According to Antonio de Montezinos, the Ten Tribes had been discovered in the American Indians of Ecuador, and England was the only country from which Jews were excluded. If England admitted them, the Messianic age might be expected.

== In fiction ==
The Queen's Fool, historical novel by Philippa Gregory, is told from the point of view of a (fictional) Marrano girl living in England at the time of Queen Mary I.

== See also ==
- History of the Jews in England
- History of the Jews in England (1066-1200)
- Edict of Expulsion
- Resettlement of the Jews in England
  - Menasseh Ben Israel (1604–1657)
- Jew Bill of 1753
- Influences on the standing of the Jews in England
- Emancipation of the Jews in England
- Early English Jewish literature
- History of the Jews in Scotland
- Spanish and Portuguese Jews
