= William Prynne =

English lawyer, author and politician (1600–1669)

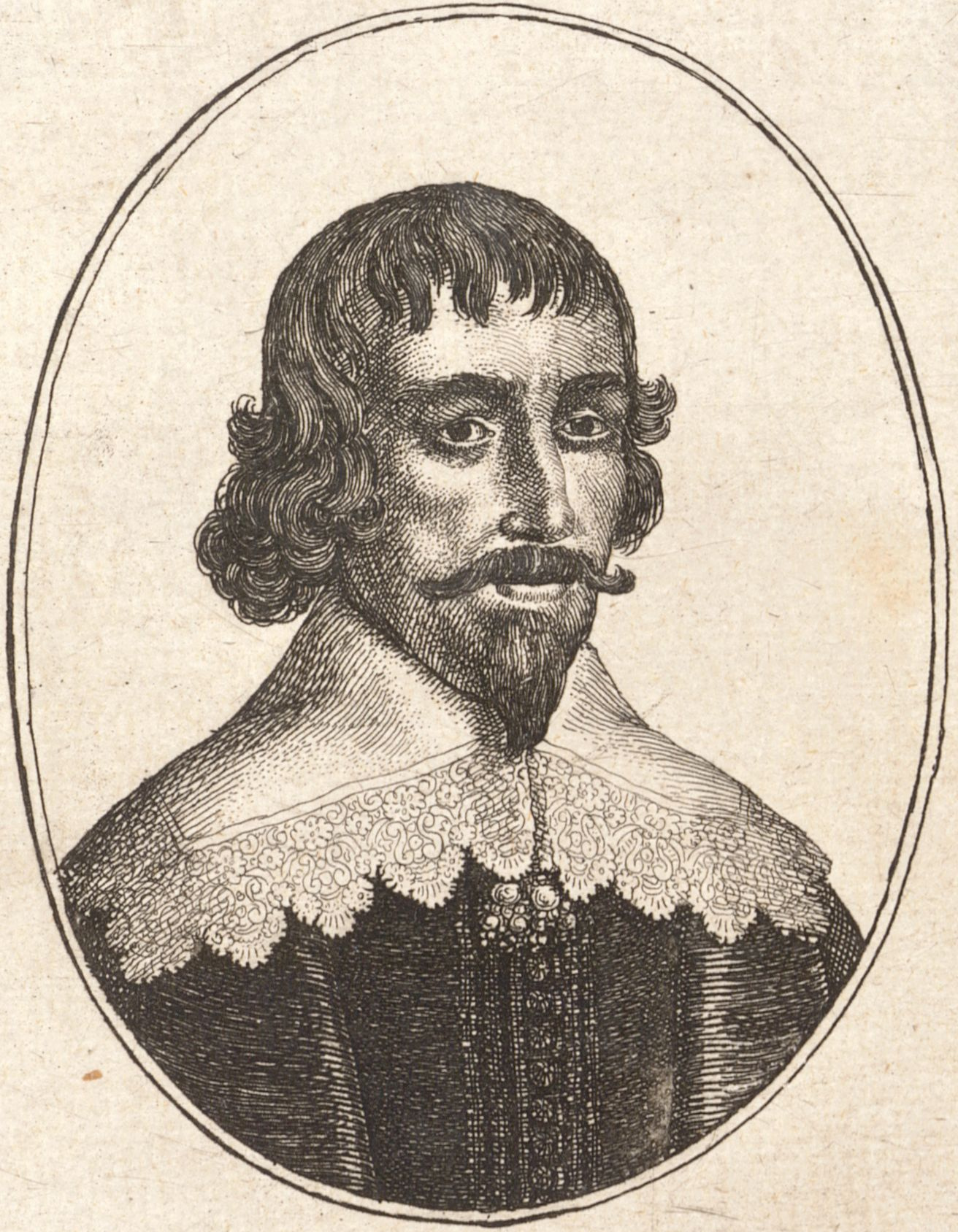
Illustration of Prynne by Wenceslaus Hollar

William Prynne (1600 – 24 October 1669), an English lawyer, voluble author, polemicist and political figure, was a prominent Puritan opponent of church policy under William Laud, Archbishop of Canterbury (1633–1645). His views were Presbyterian, but he became known in the 1640s as an Erastian, arguing for overall state control of religious matters.

Recent scholarship has portrayed Prynne as an important Caroline era propagandist whose innovative political storytelling and publishing techniques played a major role in fomenting public distrust of Charles I and Archbishop Laud.

== Early life ==
Born at Swainswick, near Bath, Somerset, William Prynne was educated at Bath Grammar School and Oriel College, Oxford. He graduated as a BA on 22 January 1621, entered as a student of Lincoln's Inn in the same year, and was called to the bar in 1628.

According to Anthony Wood, he was confirmed in his militant Puritanism by the influence of John Preston, then a lecturer at Lincoln's Inn. In 1627 he published his first of over 200 works, a theological treatise titled The Perpetuity of a Regenerate Man's Estate. This was followed in the next three years by three others attacking Arminianism and its teachers. In the preface to one of them he appealed to Parliament to suppress anything written against Calvinist doctrine and to force the clergy to subscribe to the conclusion of the Synod of Dort.

Prynne was a strong disciplinarian. After arguing that the custom of drinking healths was sinful, he asserted that for men to wear their hair long was "unseemly and unlawful unto Christians", while it was "mannish, unnatural, impudent, and unchristian" for women to cut it short.

== 1630s ==
Like many Puritans abhorring decadence, Prynne strongly opposed religious feast days, including Christmas, and revelry such as stage plays. He included in his Histriomastix (1632) a denunciation of actresses which was widely felt to be an attack on Queen Henrietta Maria. This book led to the most prominent incidents in his life, but the timing was accidental.

About 1624 Prynne had begun a book against stage-plays; on 31 May 1630 he gained a licence to print it and about November 1632 it was published. Histriomastix has over a thousand pages, in which he presents plays as unlawful, incentives to immorality, and condemned by the Scriptures, Church Fathers, modern Christian writers, and pagan philosophers. By chance, the Queen and her ladies, in January 1633, took part in the performance of Walter Montagu's The Shepherd's Paradise: this was an innovation at court. A passage reflecting on the character of female actors in general was construed as an aspersion on the Queen; passages attacking the spectators of plays and magistrates who failed to suppress them, pointed by references to Nero and other tyrants, were taken as seen on King Charles I.

The Chancellor of the Exchequer, Lord Cottington, ordered Histriomastix to "be burnt, in the most public manner that can be." As David Cressy has pointed out, this was an innovative act of public censorship. It imported continental public book-burning by the hangman for the first time. "Though not used in England", Lord Cottington noted, this manner of book burning suited Prynne's work because of its "strangeness and heinousness". William Noy, as attorney-general, took proceedings against Prynne in the Star-chamber. After a year's imprisonment in the Tower of London, he was sentenced on 17 February 1634 to life imprisonment, a fine of £5,000, expulsion from Lincoln's Inn, deprival of his Oxford University degree, and cropping of both his ears in the pillory, where he was held on 7–10 May. His book was burnt before him, and with over a thousand pages it suffocated Prynne in its smoke.

On 11 June Prynne addressed a letter to Archbishop Laud, whom he saw as his chief persecutor, charging him with illegality and injustice. Laud handed the letter to the Attorney-General as material for a new prosecution, but when Prynne was required to own his handwriting, he contrived to get hold of the letter and tore it to pieces. Prynne wrote in the Tower and published anonymous tracts against episcopacy and the Book of Sports. In A Divine Tragedy lately acted, or a Collection of sundry memorable Examples of God's Judgment upon Sabbath-breakers he introduced Noy's recent death as a warning. In an appendix to John Bastwick's Flagellum Pontificis and in A Breviate of the Bishops' intolerable Usurpations he attacked prelates in general (1635). An anonymous attack on Matthew Wren, Bishop of Norwich brought him again before the Star Chamber. On 14 June 1637 Prynne was sentenced once more to a fine of £5,000, to imprisonment for life, and to lose the rest of his ears. At the proposal of Chief Justice John Finch, he was also to be branded on the cheeks with the letters S. L., standing for "seditious libeller". Prynne was pilloried on 30 June in company with Henry Burton and John Bastwick; Prynne was handled barbarously by the executioner. He made, as he returned to his prison, a couple of Latin verses explaining the 'S. L.' with which he was branded to mean 'stigmata laudis' ("sign of praise", or "sign of Laud").

His imprisonment was then much closer: no pens or ink, nor any books allowed but the Bible, the prayer book, and some orthodox theology. To isolate him from his friends, he was sent first to Carnarvon Castle in July 1637, and then to Mont Orgueil in Jersey between 1638 and 1640. The Bailiff of Jersey, Philippe de Carteret II, treated Prynne well during this imprisonment, and Prynne was able to repay this kindness by defending Carteret's character in 1645, when he was accused as a malignant and a tyrant due to his support for the royalist cause during the English Civil Wars.

== 1640s ==
He was released by the Long Parliament in 1640. The House of Commons declared the two sentences against him illegal, restored him to his degree and to his membership of Lincoln's Inn, and voted him pecuniary reparation (as late as October 1648 he was still trying to collect it). He supported the Parliamentary cause in the English Civil War, particularly in the press, and in many pamphlets, while still pursuing the bishops.

In 1643 Prynne became involved in the controversy which followed the surrender of Bristol by Nathaniel Fiennes. Together with his ally Clement Walker, he presented articles of accusation against Fiennes to the House of Commons (15 November 1643), managed the case for the prosecution at the court-martial, which took place in the following December, and secured a condemnation of the offending officer. Prynne was also one of the counsel for the parliament at the trial of Lord Maguire in February 1645.

He was able to have the satisfaction of overseeing the trial of William Laud, which was to end in Laud's execution. He collected and arranged evidence to prove the charges against him, bore testimony himself in support of many of them, hunted up witnesses against the archbishop, and assisted the counsel for the prosecution in every way. At the time some thought he was clearly tampering with the witnesses. Prynne had the duty of searching Laud's room in the Tower for papers. He published a redacted edition of Laud's diary and a volume intended to serve as an introduction to his trial. After Laud's execution, Prynne was charged by the House of Commons (4 March 1645) to produce an account of the trial; other controversies prevented him from finishing the book.

In the rapidly shifting climate of opinion of the time, Prynne, having been at the forefront of radical opposition, soon found himself a conservative figure, defending Presbyterianism against the Independents favoured by Oliver Cromwell and the army. From 1644 he wrote pamphlets against Independents. He attacked John Goodwin and crossed his old companion in suffering, Henry Burton. He controverted and denounced John Lilburne, and called on Parliament to crush the sectaries. Prynne was equally hostile to the demands of the presbyterian clergy for the establishment of their system: Prynne maintained the supremacy of the state over the church. 'Mr. Prynne and the Erastian lawyers are now our remora,' complains Robert Baillie in September 1645. He denied in his pamphlets the right of the clergy to excommunicate or to suspend from the reception of the sacrament except on conditions defined by the laws of the state. He was answered by Samuel Rutherford. William M. Lamont writes:

... Prynne had no distrust of power or abstract love of freedom. His pamphlet, The Sword of Christian Magistracy, is one of the most blood-curdling pleas for total repressive action from the civil authority in the English language.

Prynne also came into collision with John Milton, whose doctrine on divorce he had denounced, and was replied to by the poet in a passage in his Colasterion. Milton also inserted in the original draft of his sonnet On the Forcers of Conscience a reference to "marginal Prynne's ears".

During 1647 the breach between the army and the Parliament turned Prynne's attention from theology to politics. He wrote a number of pamphlets against the army, and championed the cause of the eleven presbyterian leaders whom the army impeached. He also undertook official work. From February 1644 he had been a member of the committee of accounts, and on 1 May 1647 he was appointed one of the commissioners for the Visitation of the University of Oxford. In April 1648 Prynne accompanied Philip Herbert, 5th Earl of Pembroke when he came as chancellor of Oxford to expel recalcitrant heads of houses.

In November 1648 Prynne was elected Member of Parliament for Newport in Cornwall for the Long Parliament. As soon as he took his seat, he showed his opposition to the army. He urged the Commons to declare them rebels, and argued that concessions made by Charles in the recent treaty were a satisfactory basis for a peace. Two days later Pride's Purge took place. Prynne was arrested by Colonel Thomas Pride and Sir Hardress Waller, and kept prisoner first at an eating-house (called Hell), and then at the Swan and King's Head inns in the Strand.

== Pride's Purge to the Restoration ==
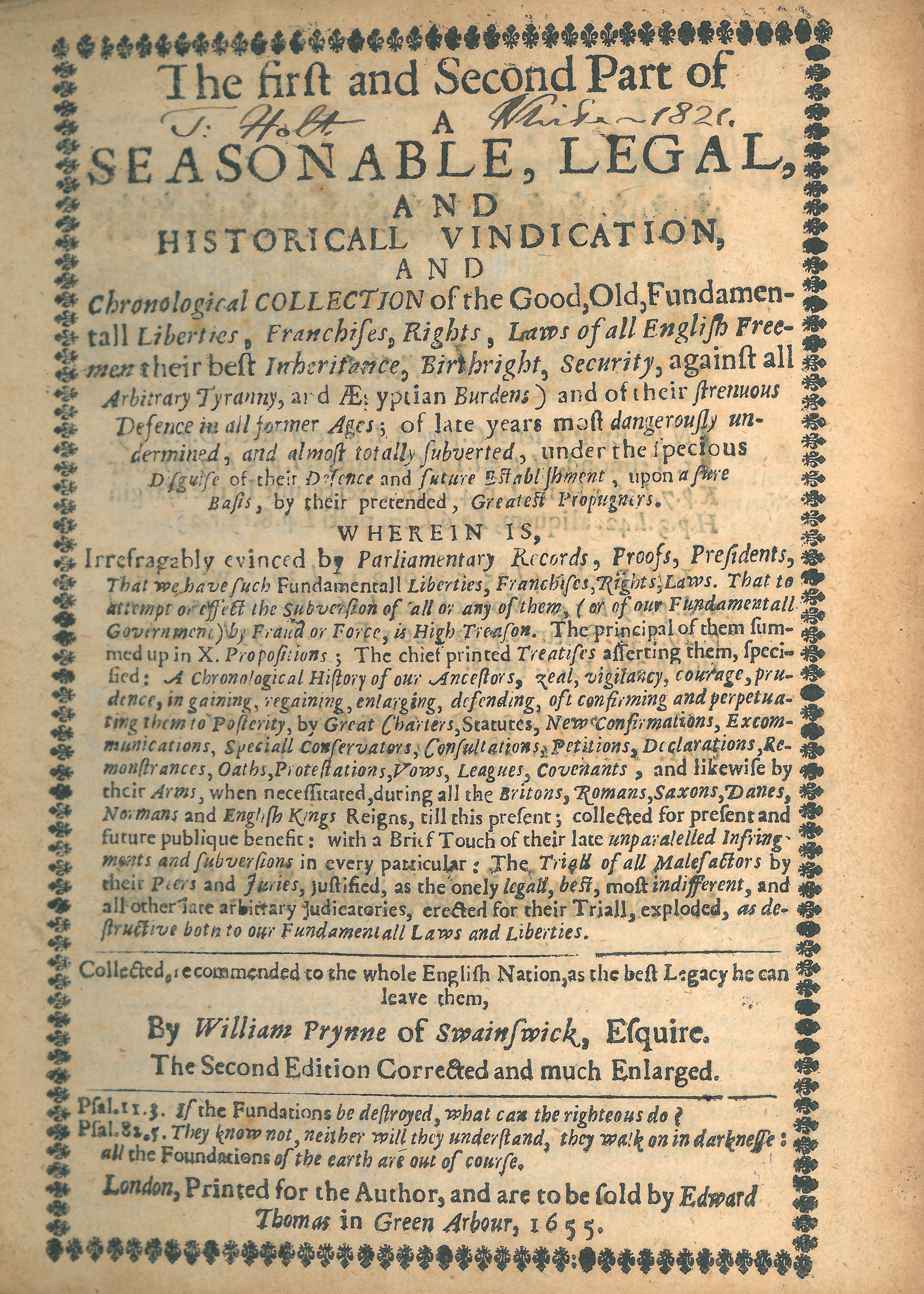
The title page of Prynne's The First and Second Part of a Seasonable, Legal, and Historicall Vindication, and Chronological Collection of the Good, Old, Fundamentall Liberties, Franchises, Rights, Laws of All English Freemen [...] (2nd ed., 1655), one of the works published when Prynne was in Swainswick

The purged Prynne protested in letters to Lord Fairfax, and by printed declarations on behalf of himself and the other arrested members. He published also a denunciation of the proposed trial of King Charles, being answered by a collection of extracts from his own earlier pamphlets. Released from custody some time in January 1649, Prynne retired to Swainswick, and began a paper war against the new government. He became a thorn in Cromwell's side. He wrote three pamphlets against the engagement to be faithful to the Commonwealth, and argued that neither in conscience, law, nor prudence was he bound to pay the taxes which it imposed. The government retaliated by imprisoning him for nearly three years without a trial. On 30 June 1650 he was arrested and confined, first in Dunster Castle and afterwards in Taunton Castle (12 June 1651) and Pendennis Castle (27 June 1651). He was finally offered his liberty on giving security to the amount of £1,000 that he would henceforward do nothing against the government; but, refusing to make any promise, he was released unconditionally on 18 February 1653.

On his release Prynne returned to pamphleteering. He wrote against suspected plots emanating from the Pope and attacked Quakerism, vindicated the rights of patrons against the triers, and discussed the right limits of the Sabbath. The proposal to lift the thirteenth-century ban on the residence of Jews, being promoted then in England by Manasseh ben Israel, among others, inspired him with a pamphlet against the scheme, called in brief the Short Demurrer. The pamphlet was printed shortly before the Whitehall Conference, and was influential in strengthening opinion against the readmission of the Jews. In particular, Prynne doubts the probability that the Jews would be converted to Christianity once in England. Oliver Cromwell allowed the Jews to return to the British Isles on the condition that the Jews attend compulsory Christian sermons on a Sunday, to encourage their conversion to Christianity. Cromwell based this decision on St. Paul's epistle to the Romans 10:15. The offer of the crown to Cromwell by the "petition and advice" suggested a parallel between Cromwell and Richard III. Similarly, when the Protector, as Cromwell then was styled, set up a House of Lords, Prynne expanded the tract in defence of their rights which he had published in 1648 into an historical treatise of five hundred pages. These writings, however, attracted little attention.

After the fall of Richard Cromwell he regained the popular ear. As soon as the Long Parliament was re-established, Prynne got together a few of the members excluded by Pride's purge and endeavoured to take his place in the house. On 7 May 1659 he was kept back by the guards, but on 9 May he managed to get in, and kept his seat there for a whole sitting. Arthur Haslerig and Sir Henry Vane threatened him, but Prynne told them he had as good right there as either, and had suffered more for the rights of parliament than any of them. They could only get rid of him by adjourning the house, and forcibly keeping him out when it reassembled. On 27 December when the parliament was again restored after its interruption by John Lambert, Prynne and his friends made a fresh attempt to enter, but were once more excluded. From May 1659 to February 1660 he went on publishing tracts on the case of the "secluded members and attacks on the ref-formed Rump Parliament and the army". Marchamont Nedham, Henry Stubbe, John Rogers, and others printed serious answers to his arguments, while obscure libellers ridiculed him.

On 21 February 1660 George Monck ordered the guards of the house to readmit the secluded members. Prynne, girt with an old basket-hilted sword, marched into Westminster Hall at their head; though the effect was spoiled when Sir William Waller tripped on the sword. The house charged him to bring in a bill for the dissolution of the Long Parliament. In the debate on the bill Prynne asserted the rights of Charles II of England and claimed that the writs should be issued in his name. He also helped to forward the Restoration by accelerating the passing of the Militia Bill, which placed the control of the forces in the hands of the king's friends. A letter which he addressed to Charles II shows that he was personally thanked by the king for his services.

== From 1660 ==
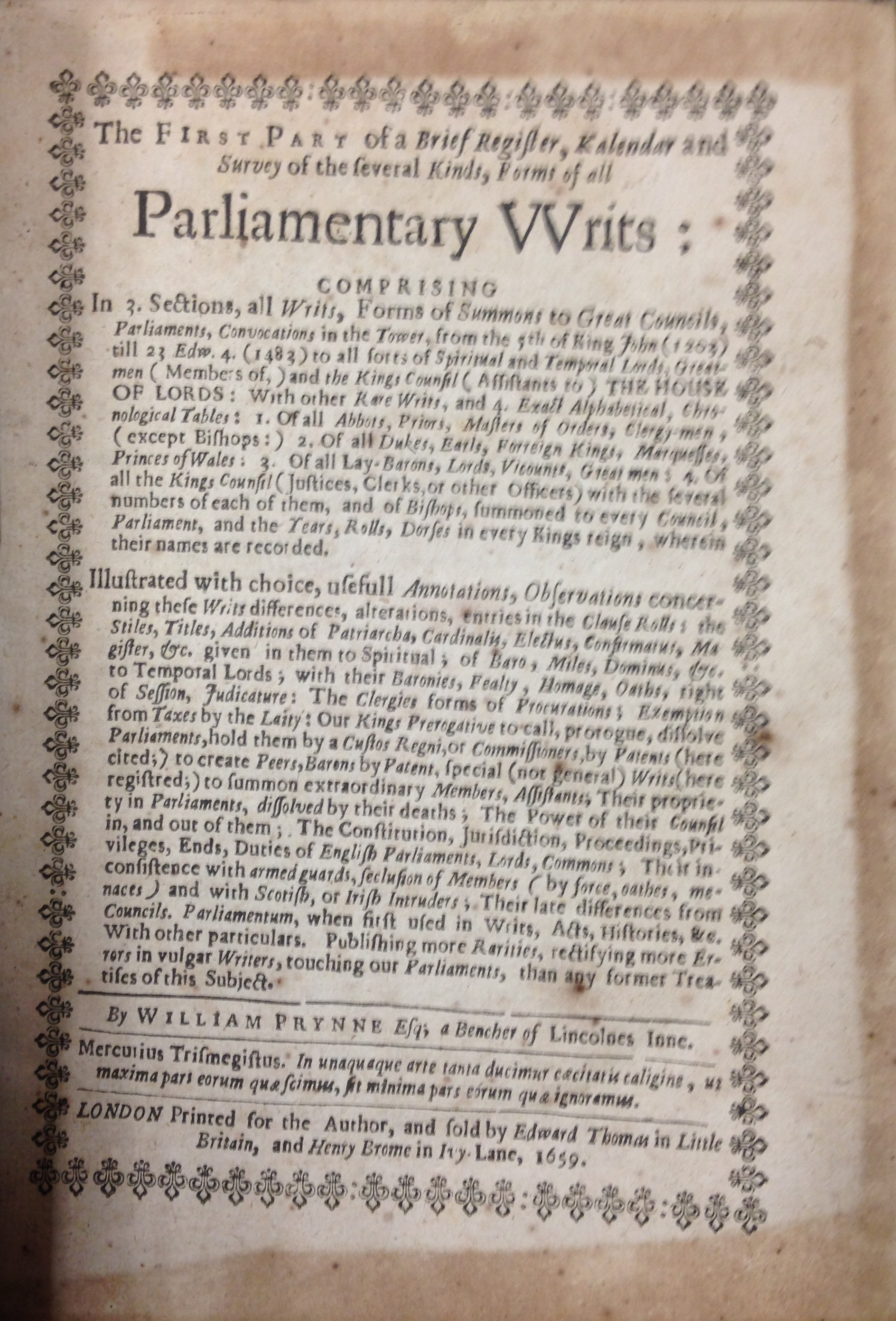
The title page of Prynne's The First Part of a Brief Register, Kalendar and Survey of the Several Kinds, Forms of All Parliamentary VVrits (1st ed., 1659). Prynne went on to publish another three parts in 1660, 1662 and 1664.

Prynne supported the Restoration, and was rewarded with public office. In April 1660 he was elected MP for Bath in the Convention Parliament. He was bitter against the regicides and the supporters of the previous government, trying to restrict the scope of the Act of Indemnity. He successfully moved to have Charles Fleetwood excepted, and urged the exclusion of Richard Cromwell and Judge Francis Thorpe. He proposed punitive and financial measures of broad scope, was zealous for the disbanding of the army, and was one of the commissioners appointed to pay it off. In the debates on religion he was one of the leaders of the presbyterians, spoke against the Thirty-nine Articles, denied the claims of the bishops, urged the validity of presbyterian ordination, and supported the bill for turning the king's ecclesiastical declaration into law.

As a politician Prynne was during his latter years of minor importance. He was re-elected MP for Bath to the Cavalier Parliament of May 1661. He asserted his presbyterianism by refusing to kneel when the two houses received the sacrament together. A few weeks earlier he had published a pamphlet demanding the revision of the prayer-book, but the new parliament was opposed to any concessions to nonconformity. On 15 July a pamphlet by Prynne against the Corporation Bill was voted scandalous and seditious. In January 1667 Prynne was one of the managers of Lord Mordaunt's impeachment. He spoke several times on Clarendon's impeachment, and opposed the bill for his banishment. On constitutional subjects and points of procedure his opinion had weight, and in 1667 he was privately consulted by the king on the question whether a parliament which had been prorogued could be convened before the day fixed for its resumption.

He became the Keeper of Records in the Tower of London; as a writer his most lasting works belong to that period, for the amount of historical material they contain. During this time, he expanded upon An Exact Abridgement of the Records in the Tower of London, published by the Cotton library under the stewardship of Sir Thomas Cotton. The text contained comprehensive records of parliaments held between the reigns of Edward II and Richard III of England, and was considered a tribute to Prynne's fascination toward parliament's relationship with the English monarchy. The book was printed by renowned London publisher William Leake.

Histriomastix is the one of his works that receives attention from modern scholars, but for its relevance to English Renaissance theatre. Anthony à Wood found him affable, obliging towards researchers, and courteous in the fashion of the early part of the century. Prynne died unmarried on 24 October 1669. He was buried in the undercroft of the chapel of Lincoln's Inn.

== Sources ==
- Kirby, Ethyn Williams. William Prynne: A Study in Puritanism. Cambridge, MA, Harvard University Press, 1931.
- Lamont, William M. Puritanism and Historical Controversy. Montreal, McGill-Queen's Press, 1996.
- Fitch, Thomas. Caroline Puritanism as exemplified in the life and work of William Prynne. PhD thesis Edinburgh, 1949.
