= Joseph Salvador =

British businessman (1716–1786)

Joseph Salvador (1716–1786) was a British businessman in London. Descended from Portuguese Sephardic Jews, he is often mistakenly referred to as having been the first and only Jew to serve as a director of the British East India Company. While Salvador invested considerable sums in East India Company stock and was active in Company politics in the 1760s, there is no evidence of his serving as a director.

Salvador's ancestors had escaped persecution during the Portuguese Inquisition and migrated to the Netherlands. From there they immigrated to London, England in the eighteenth century. He grew up here in an affluent and well-known Spanish-Portuguese family. Salvador belonged to the Portuguese Sephardic Jewish synagogue in London, and was a leader in the affairs of this Portuguese-speaking community. He was a prominent businessman and financier. He lobbied for the 1753 Jew Bill to extend full citizenship and civil rights to Jews.

In 1759, Salvador was elected a Fellow of the Royal Society. When George III ascended the throne of England, Salvador headed the seven-man delegation that congratulated him on behalf of England's Jewish community. Salvador was a pro-Hanovarian freemason belonging to the Premier Grand Lodge of England and was engaged in anti-Jacobite activities.

Salvador was also a great patron; together with the DaCosta family, he sponsored transportation for 42 poor Jews to Georgia in 1733. These colonists lay the groundwork for what was to become the Jewish communities of the city of Savannah and Charleston, South Carolina. Many migrated from Savannah to Charleston after the Spanish attacked Georgia, as they feared getting caught in another Inquisition. From the 1730s, Charleston became the preferred destination for Sephardic Jews in the South.

Eventually migrating to the United States using his familial wealth, Salvador owned and lived on a plantation in South Carolina. The Salvador and the DaCosta family bought hundreds of thousands of acres in Ninety-Six District in the colony of South Carolina in the 1730s. He was eventually financially ruined after the great earthquake that destroyed Lisbon in 1755, as he had invested considerably in property in that city.

Joseph's nephew was Francis Salvador, who emigrated to South Carolina in 1773, buying 7,000 acres in Ninety-Six District. He joined the American Patriot cause and in 1774 was elected to the Provincial Congress, the first Jew to be elected to public office in the Thirteen Colonies (and future United States.) In August 1776, he was killed in a battle in South Carolina, the first Jew to be killed in the American Revolutionary War.

== See also ==
- Sampson Gideon
