= Caceres family =

Jewish family

Caceres was the name of a family, members of which lived in Venezuela, Portugal, the Netherlands, England, Mexico, Honduras, Peru, Suriname, the West Indies, and the United States. They came from the city of Cáceres in Spain.

== Francisco de Caceres ==
Francisco de Caceres (Alcuéscar (Cáceres) 1539 - Barinas plains 1589) was a Spanish Captain founder of the City of La Grita in 1576, also known as ciudad de Atenas or ciudad del Espíritu Santo. He was governor of the Province of La Grita (Venezuela). His brother Alonso de Caceres (Alcántara, Cáceres, late fifteenth century - ?) was a Spanish conquistador and governor-captain of Santa Marta, who travelled extensively throughout the Americas from Mexico, through Central America, and Peru. He was one of the most active soldiers who served in the 16th-century Spanish conquest.

== Antonio Dias (Diaz) de Caceres ==
The first reference to any person bearing the name is in a list of heretics, posted according to custom in the cathedral in Mexico City, where the names of Antonio Dias (or Diaz) de Caceres and Catalina de Leon, his wife, occur as "Judaizers". The latter did penance at an auto da fé held on February 24, 1590, in that city. Their daughter Doña Leonor de Caceres was denounced as a "Judaizer" by her aunt, Doña Mariana Nuñez de Carabajal (see Francisca Nuñez de Carabajal), before the tribunal of Mexico. Her testimony gives these data: Antonio Dias de Caceres and Jorge de Almeida were married on the same day, in the city of Parmco, Mexico, to Catalina and Leonor de Carabajal, sisters of the deponent, and, after a visit to Spain, moved to the district of San Paolo in Mexico City.

Antonio appears to have lived in another district, in a house which served as a gathering-place for fasting and prayer; and although they all attended mass and otherwise observed the rites and ceremonies of the Roman Catholic Church, they practiced their Jewish rites in private. This was soon discovered; the deponent, her mother, and brothers were arrested by order of the Inquisition; and Antonio Dias de Caceres, fearing a similar fate, went to China. There he lived three years, came back to Mexico, feigned at first estrangement from his wife, because she was a "Judaizing" penitent, and finally, seeming to yield to the entreaties of friends who sought to bring them together, became nominally reconciled to her and set about in earnest to obey the behests of the Mosaic law. Antonio observed caution, dreading the arm of the Holy Office, but persisted, together with his family, in keeping the Sabbath at home. Prayers were recited at home out of a Hebrew book, said to have been written in verse, and the Psalms, without the required Gloria Patri, were chanted by all. His daughter, the above-mentioned Leonor de Caceres, figured as a penitent at an auto da fé held in the city of Mexico on March 25, 1601. A facsimile of a document dated September 6, 1608, containing an account of her trial, is given in vol. iv. of Publications of the American Jewish Historical Society.

== Isabel Caceres ==
A victim of the Inquisition in Toledo in 1625; wife of Luis Baez.

== Jacob (Yahacob) Rodriguez Caceres ==
Martyr, who died at the stake in 1665, at Córdoba. Daniel Levi de Barrios celebrates him in verse in the prologue to his allegorical comedy Contra la Verdad no ay Fuerça. Panegirico a los tres biena venturados mártires Abraham Athias, Yahacob Rodriguez Caseres, y Raquel Nuñez Fernandez, que fueron quemados vivos en Cordova por santificar la unidad divina, en 16. de Tammuz, año de 5425 (1665), Amsterdam (no date).

== Moseh de Caceres ==
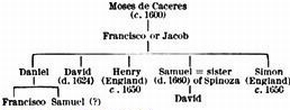
Descendants of Moseh de Caceres

One of the founders of the Portuguese community in Amsterdam, who flourished about 1600.

== Francisco de Caceres ==
(1) Writer of the seventeenth century; son of Daniel de Caceres of Amsterdam. He translated from Italian into Spanish the Vision Deleytable y Summarico de Todas las Sciencias, a work written by Alfonso de la Torre and translated into Italian by Domenico Dolphino. The translation of Caceres, published at Amsterdam in 1663, and dedicated to Don Emanuel, prince of Portugal, consists of two parts, the first dealing with the various sciences, the second with moral philosophy. Of the first part, chapter I treats of the "evil of things, and the confusion in the world"; the following six chapters treat of logic, rhetoric, arithmetic, geometry, music, and astrology, and the remaining chapters treat of metaphysics, pneumatics, and physics. Part II discusses ethics and politics.

Johann Christoph Wolf makes this Francisco de Caceres the author also of Dialogos Satiricos, published at Amsterdam in 1616. Meyer Kayserling, however, ascribes that work to (2) Francisco or Jacob de Caceres who was probably a son of Moseh de Caceres, one of the founders of the Jewish-Portuguese community of Amsterdam. The latter Francisco or Jacob also translated into Spanish Los Siete Dias de la Semana Sobre la Creacion del Mundo, a work by Bastasi, dedicated to Jacob Tirado. As the Dialogos Satiricos was published as early as 1616, it is not probable that the author was the former Francisco de Caceres.

Francisco (or Jacob) had, so far as can be determined, five sons:

(1) Daniel de Caceres: Writer of the seventeenth century; son of Jacob de Caceres. He held the degree of master of arts. Caceres was a friend of Manasseh ben Israel, upon whose works, The Conciliator and On Human Frailty (written about 1642), he wrote approbations. He also wrote a eulogy on Saul Levi Morteira (Amsterdam, 1645).

(2) David de Caceres, who, according to Kayserling, died October 18, 1624, at Amsterdam.

(3) Henrique (or Henry) de Caceres, who lived in England c. 1650, probably the same who, with Benjamin de Caceres, petitioned the king on April 8, 1661, to permit them to live and trade in Barbados and Suriname.

(4) Samuel de Caceres: Dutch poet and preacher and brother-in-law of Benedict Spinoza; died November 1660, at Amsterdam. He was a pupil of Rabbi Saul Levi Morteira of Amsterdam. The title "Poeta, Predicador, y Jaxam, de la Ley Sancta Escritor" (Poet, Preacher, and Cantor, Writer of the Holy Law), given to Caceres by his contemporaries, shows the eminent position which he occupied in the Jewish community of Amsterdam. "De la Ley Sancta Escritor" refers to the Spanish translation of the Bible, which he edited, revised, and corrected, and which was published in 1661, soon after his death.

(5) Simon de Caceres: Military strategist, merchant, and communal leader; flourished in the middle of the seventeenth century. He was prominent in mercantile affairs in Hamburg, London, South America, and the West Indies; and his transactions extended to many parts of the world.

Caceres is described as a chauvinist Jew, boastful of his Jewish descent. He joined Antonio Fernandez Carvajal in the acquisition of the Bet Cholim cemetery in London, and was one of the petitioners who signed the document presented to Oliver Cromwell by Manasseh ben Israel in March 1656. Queen Christina of Sweden is known to have interceded with Cromwell on his behalf for certain commercial privileges in Barbados. At a later date the king of Denmark gave Caceres's brother a letter of recommendation to Charles II of England, which was instrumental in procuring for the Jews in the West Indies an extension of commercial facilities. Simon was one of Cromwell's intelligencers; and there are at least two documents among the Thurloe papers which show that his experience was utilized by the lord protector. One is called "A Note of What Things Are Wanting in Jamaica". It is a memorandum containing minute advice with regard to fortifications and implements. From a passage in Cromwell's Letters and Speeches, ed. Carlyle (iii. 131), it would seem that Caceres's recommendations were followed, for the needed supplies were forwarded.

Together with this memorandum Caceres submitted to the protector a remarkable scheme for the conquest of Chile, wherein he proposed to enlist "men of his own nation" (meaning Jews), and offered to lead the expedition in person. In his letter of instructions Cromwell refers to the desirability of hindering the Spanish trade with Peru and Cartagena, and of striving with the Spaniards for the mastery of all those seas. At a later date Caceres presented another plan to Cromwell, which provided for the protection of the Barbados trade and for improving the administration of the navigation act. This document seems to have been unauthorized, and turns out to be a personal application for an office he desired to have created for himself.

Daniel (see above) had two (?) sons; (1) Francisco de Caceres and (2) Samuel ben Daniel de Caceres, whose name, if he is not Daniel's son, remains a "crux interpretum". It is more than probable that the two Samuels have been confounded by bibliographers. Samuel, the poet and preacher, had a son named David de Caceres, who was printer in Amsterdam in 1661. Another person bearing that name was rabbi at Salonica, and afterward (c. 1650) at Hebron, Palestine.

== Other individuals ==
A Bernard de Caceres is mentioned in the Calendars of State Papers 1661-68, as residing in the West Indies. One of the chief members of the Jewish congregation in Suriname, whose name is affixed to a special charter of privileges dated October 1, 1669, was Henrique de Caceres, and a Samuel de Caceres is spoken of in Curaçao, W. I., in the year 1692. In 1891, a Mr. Benjamin de Caceres officiated at Curaçao in the absence of a rabbi.

Luisa Cáceres de Arismendi (Caracas, September 25, 1799 – Caracas, June 28, 1866) was a heroine of the Venezuelan War of Independence. In recognition of her loyalty her remains were entombed in the Panteón Nacional of Caracas in 1876; she was the first woman to be given this honor.

Andrés Avelino Cáceres (1836 – 1923) was three times President of Peru during the 19th century, from 1884 to 1885, then from 1886 to 1890, and again from 1894 to 1895. In Peru, he is considered a national hero for leading the resistance to Chilean occupation during the War of the Pacific (1879–1883), where he fought as a General in the Peruvian Army.
