= Whitehall Conference =

1655 meeting about Jews in England

The Whitehall Conference was a gathering of prominent English merchants, clergymen, and lawyers convened by Oliver Cromwell for the purpose of debating whether Jews should be readmitted to England. The conference lasted from 4 to 18 December 1655.

While Cromwell himself was in favour of Jewish resettlement, the participants ultimately broke down into three groups.

The London merchants opposed resettlement due to fears of economic competition, while the clergymen were not in favour on religious grounds.

The second group, consisting mainly of Cromwell's officials and military figures, backed readmission with certain precautions built in. They were in favour of giving Jews a probationary period during which they could be expelled if they misbehaved. They were expected not to blaspheme Christ or attempt to convert Christians.

The third group consisted of the Millenarians and Sabbatarians, both of whom broke down into radical and more conservative wings. The conservative wing of this faction supported readmission with clauses built in that would make it possible for Jews to be thrown out if things did not go as planned. The radical wing argued that it was England's divine duty to readmit Jews, or else face God's wrath. Most members of this third faction hoped to convert Jews to Christianity upon their arrival in England, thereby hastening the second coming and the advent of the messianic age.

While the conference failed to reach a definitive conclusion as to whether Jewish readmission should be carried out, it was significant for clarifying that resettlement was legally permissible. Most prominent legal scholars agreed that "there is no law against their (the Jews) coming". This was correct, as Jews had been expelled from England by the Edict of Expulsion in 1290 on the basis of a royal decree, not on the basis of parliamentary legislation. This finding would prove crucial to the eventual readmission of Jews in the 1660s.

== See also ==
- History of the Jews in England
- History of the Jews in England (1066–1290)
- Edict of Expulsion
- History of the Marranos in England
- Resettlement of the Jews in England
  - Menasseh Ben Israel (1604–1657)
