= Plantation Act 1740 =

Act of the Parliament of Great Britain

Naturalization Act 1739
- Act of Parliament
- Parliament of Great Britain
- Long title: An Act for Naturalizing such foreign Protestants and others therein mentioned, as are settled or shall settle in any of His Majesty's Colonies in America.
- Citation: 13 Geo. 2. c. 7
- Territorial extent: Great Britain; British America

Dates
- Royal assent: 19 March 1740
- Commencement: 1 June 1740 (Note: Section 1.)
- Repealed: 12 May 1870
Other legislation
| Amended by | Aliens Act 1746 |
| Repealed by | Naturalization Act 1870 |
| Relates to | Naturalisation and Restoration of Blood Act 1609; Naturalization of Jews Act 1753; Commissions to Foreign Protestants Act 1756; American Protestant Soldier Naturalization Act 1762 |

Status: Repealed

Text of statute as originally enacted

The Plantation Act 1740 (Note: Referring to colonies) (13 Geo. 2. c. 7), also known as the Naturalization Act 1740 (Note: The act received royal assent in 1740. However, it was formally dated as 1739 in older official uses because acts passed before the Acts of Parliament (Commencement) Act 1793 came into force, acts were dated by the year in which the relevant parliamentary session began, which, in this case, was 1739.), was an act of the Parliament of Great Britain that was officially titled An Act for Naturalizing such foreign Protestants and others therein mentioned, as are settled or shall settle in any of His Majesty's Colonies in America.

The act became effective on 1 June 1740 and allowed any Protestant alien residing in any of their American colonies for seven years, without being absent from that colony for more than two months, to be deemed "his Majesty’s natural-born subjects of this Kingdom."

The act also required making specific declarations concerning royal allegiance and succession, profession of the Christian faith, and the payment of two shillings. Compared to other alternatives available at the time, the act provided a cheap and easy method of imperial naturalization, and by the standards of the time, the length of residency was not unreasonable.

== Background ==
Reflecting the situation in Britain, the necessary profession of Christian faith was distinctly Protestant and specifically Anglican. The act was not intended for conscientious Roman Catholics, and they were referred to in the law as Papists. Exceptions however for non-conforming religious scruples and conscience were made, in the case of Quakers and Jews. Adherents of both faiths were allowed to dispense with the Sacramental test, with the former being allowed to affirm the oaths, and the latter being relieved of the obligation to repeat the words 'Upon the true faith of a Christian', at the end of the Oath of Abjuration required by the Act of Settlement since 1701.

== Contents ==
The act was enacted to systematise naturalization procedures in all localities as well as to encourage immigration to the American colonies. It provided a workable naturalization procedure by empowering colonial courts to administer the oath of allegiance to aliens. The act endowed colonial courts with the responsibility of deciding when alien petitioners had fulfilled the statutory requirements for imperial citizenship.

The Secretaries of Colonies were required, under penalty, to send annual lists of such persons to the Commissioners of Trade and Plantations. In proprietary colonies, the judges were appointed by colonial governors and thus represented the royal or proprietary interest. However, by delegating authority to colonial officials, naturalization became subject to the pressure of the same local interest groups that increasingly defied the governor's efforts to implement royal and proprietary instructions on other issues. Despite the penalties imposed under the act, only six Secretaries of the thirteen American Colonies and one in the West Indies submitted the mandated lists.

== Development ==
In England during the 17th and 18th centuries, several basic statutes applied to naturalization, but these statutes would not include many aliens in the colonies who were considered an integral part of the colonial communities. Over the same time period, the American provinces (except New Hampshire) passed their own naturalization laws, which granted citizenship to people living within their province. These laws were based more on local colonial interpretations of community citizenship than on stricter considerations in the mother-country. but they gave no rights beyond their borders. This situation was initially accepted as positive and workable in England, but proved to be too inconsistent with and broader imperial intentions as time passed.

== Subsequent developments ==
Britain began withdrawing support to promote immigration to the colonies at the end of the Seven Years' War. Colonial implementation both before and after the Plantation Act tended to ignore, evade, and reshape English regulations, thus vitiating many policy decisions and generating a chaotic array of citizenship procedures. The Navigation Acts were a particular target for evasion, since they were seen as acting more as restraint on both colonial naturalization and its peoples' ability to take part fully in the economy. Colonial naturalization of aliens was outright forbidden in December 1773, under any conditions. A ban on royal land grants, initiated earlier in 1773, was made final in February 1774.

The colonial naturalization laws and the Plantation Act, during its nearly 30-year utilisation would define British North America as a refuge and land of opportunity, The prohibition on naturalizing foreigners under the act was considered intolerable, and would be included, inter alia, in the grievances listed in the Declaration of Independence, though some consider that surprising. Despite being a British law, the Plantation Act "was the model upon which the Naturalization Act of 1790, the first U.S. naturalization act, with respect to time, oath of allegiance, process of swearing before a judge, and the like, was clearly based."

The whole act was repealed by section 18 of, and the schedule to, the Naturalization Act 1870 (33 & 34 Vict. c. 14).
