= Antonio Fernandez Carvajal =

Portuguese-Jewish merchant

Antonio Fernandez Carvajal (c. 1590 – November 10, 1659)—in Portuguese: António Fernandes Carvalhal—was a Portuguese-Jewish merchant, who became the first endenizened English Jew. Carvajal and Simon de Caceres, together with other prominent members of the Sephardic community, revealed themselves as Jews by signing a petition to Oliver Cromwell asking for the right to practise their religion and bury their dead. It was to Carvajal that Cromwell gave the assurance of the right of Jews to remain in England and who appointed Carvajal as the principal agent of the English Jews.

== Life ==
He was born around 1590, probably at Fundão, Portugal. He appears to have left Fundão on account of the Inquisition and, proceeding to the Canary Islands, acquired much property there, made many commercial connections, which led him (about 1635) to London, where he settled in Leadenhall Street. In 1649 the council of state appointed him one among the five persons who received the army contract for corn. In 1653 Carvajal was reported as owning a number of ships trading to the East and West Indies, to Brazil, and to the Levant.

He dealt in all kinds of merchandise, including gunpowder, wine, hides, pictures, cochineal, and especially corn and silver, and is reported to have brought to England, on average, £100,000 worth of silver per annum.

In the early days of his residence in England, Carvajal used to attend mass at the Spanish ambassador's chapel, and in 1645 was informed against for not attending church; but the House of Lords, on the petition of several leading London merchants, quashed the proceedings. In 1650, when war broke out with Portugal, Carvajal's ships were especially exempted from seizure, though he was nominally a Portuguese subject. In 1655 he and his two sons were granted denizenship as English subjects (the patent being dated August 17 of that year); and when the war with Spain broke out in the following year, his property in the Canaries was liable to seizure, as he was a British subject. Oliver Cromwell made arrangements by which Carvajal's goods were transported from the Canaries in an English ship which passed under Dutch colors.

When Menasseh Ben Israel came to England in 1655 to petition Parliament for the return of the Jews after King Edward I's Edict of Expulsion of the Jews in 1290, whereby all Jewish people were formally expelled from England, Carvajal, though his own position was secured, associated himself with the petition; and he was one of the three persons in whose names the first Jewish burial-ground was acquired after the Robles case had forced the Jews in England to acknowledge their creed. In 1657, Carvajal leased an orchard of fruit trees in Mile End for ten times its market value to establish England's first Jewish cemetery, the Velho Cemetery. Only two years after the cemetery was finished, Carvajal became the second person to be buried there.

Carvajal, besides advancing money to Parliament on cochineal, had been of service to Cromwell in obtaining information as to the Royalists' doings in Holland (1656). One of his servants, Somers, alias Butler, and also a relative, Alonzo di Fonseca Meza, acted as intelligencers for Cromwell in Holland, and reported about Royalist levies, finances, and spies, and the relations between Charles II and Spain.

It was to Carvajal that Cromwell gave the assurance of the right of Jews to remain in England. Under the date of February 4, 1657, Burton, in his diary, states:

The Jews, those able and general intelligencers whose intercourse with the Continent Cromwell had before turned to profitable account, he now conciliated by a seasonable benefaction to their principal agent [Carvajal] resident in England.

According to Lucien Wolf, in 1658 a cargo of logwood belonging to Carvajal was seized by the customs officers. He assembled his servants and friends, broke open the government warehouses, and carried off his merchandise. The litigation to which this gave rise was interrupted only by Carvajal's death, which occurred in London.

Carvajal died after surgery for his gallstones on 10 November 1659. Samuel Pepys, who had also been operated on by the esteemed lithotomist Thomas Hollier; renowned for completing 40 successful operations in one year without fatality, attended his funeral and noted it in his diary on 3 December. (Note: Pepy's Diary for 3rd December, 1659: Being this morning (for observacion sake) at the Jewish Synagogue in London I heared many lamentacions made by Portugall Jewes for ye death of Ferdinando ye Merchant, who was lately cutt (by the same hand wth my selfe) of ye Stone.)

== Bibliography ==
- Epitaph given by D. Kaufmann, in Jew. Quart. Rev. i.92-93.
- L. Wolf, The First English Jew, in Transactions of the Historical Society of England, ii.14–16;
- Chisholm, Hugh, ed. (1911). "Carvajal, Antonio Fernandez" . Encyclopædia Britannica. Vol. 5 (11th ed.). Cambridge University Press. p. 437.
