= Menasseh Ben Israel =

Rabbi, kabbalist, writer, diplomat, printer and publisher

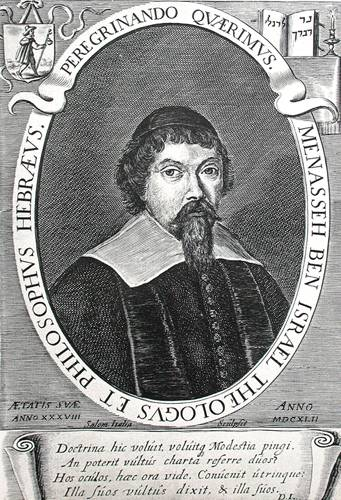
- Engraved portrait by Salom Italia, 1642
- Born: Manoel Dias Soeiro; 1604; La Rochelle, Kingdom of France
- Died: 20 November 1657 (aged 52–53); Middelburg, Dutch Republic
- Resting place: Ouderkerk aan de Amstel, Netherlands
- Occupation: Rabbi

Manoel Dias Soeiro (Dutch: [maːˈnul ˈdijɑ(s) ˈsʋeːroː]; 1604 – 20 November 1657), better known by his Hebrew name Menasseh or Menashe ben Israel (מנשה בן ישראל), (Note: Also known as Menasheh ben Yossef ben Yisrael and by the acronym MB"Y or MBI.) was a Jewish scholar, rabbi, kabbalist, writer, diplomat, printer, publisher, and founder of the first Hebrew printing press (named Emeth Meerets Titsmah) in Amsterdam in 1626.

== Life ==
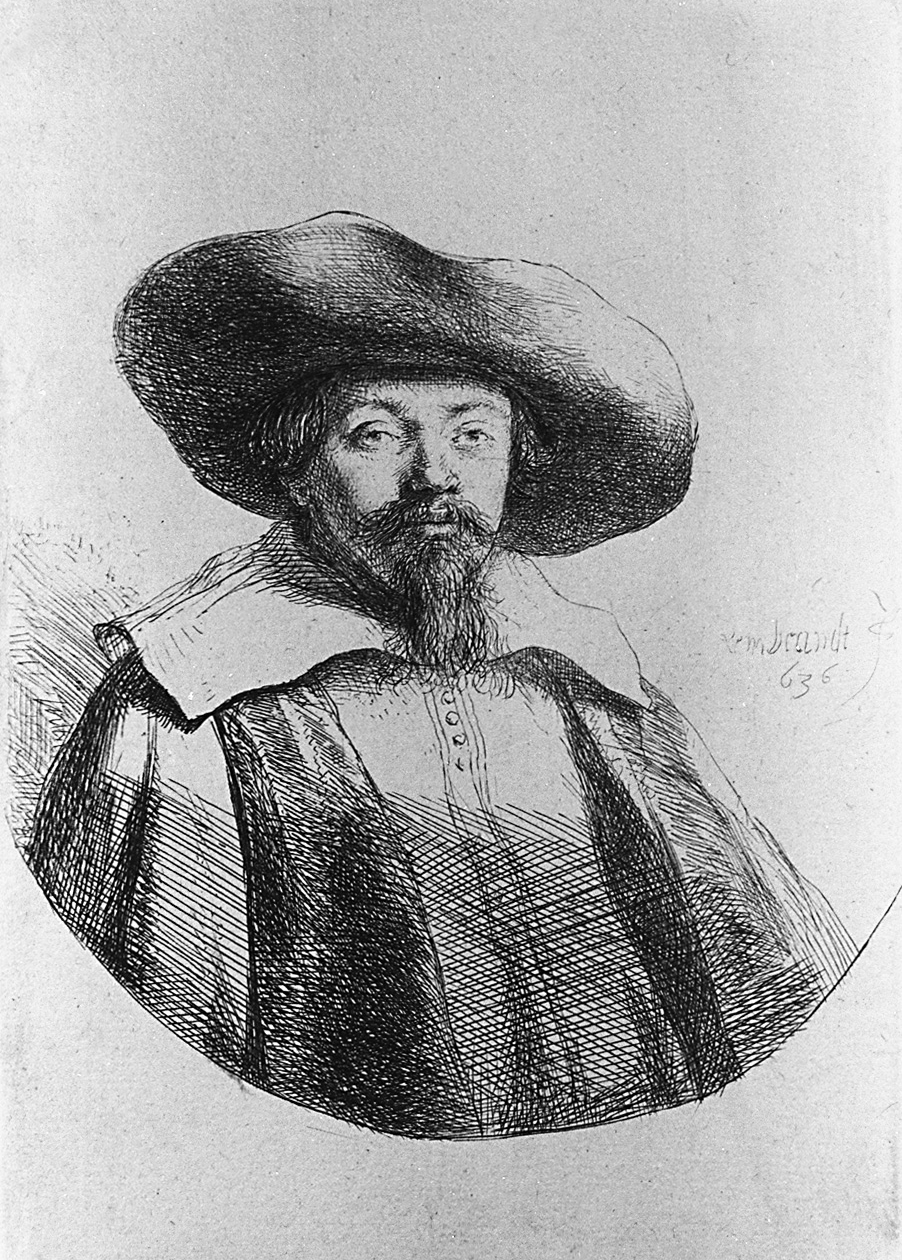
A portrait etching by Rembrandt probably depicting Samuel Menasseh ben Israel, a son

Menasseh was born in La Rochelle in 1604, with the name Manoel Dias Soeiro, a year after his parents had left mainland Portugal because of the Inquisition. The family moved to the Netherlands in 1610. The Netherlands was in the middle of a process of religious revolt against Catholic Spanish rule throughout the Eighty Years' War (1568–1648). Amsterdam was an important center of Jewish life in Europe at this time. The family's arrival in 1610 was during the Twelve Years' Truce mediated by France and England at The Hague. In Amsterdam he studied under Moses Raphael de Aguilar.

Menasseh rose to eminence not only as a rabbi and an author, but also as a printer. He established the first Hebrew press in Holland. One of his earliest works, El Conciliador, published in 1632, won immediate reputation; it was an attempt to reconcile apparent discrepancies in various parts of the Hebrew Bible. Among his correspondents were Gerardus Vossius, Hugo Grotius, Petrus Serrarius, António Vieira and Pierre Daniel Huet. In 1638, he decided to settle in Brazil, as he still found it difficult to provide for his wife and family in Amsterdam. He may have visited the Dutch colony's capital of Recife, but did not move there. One of the reasons his financial situation improved in Amsterdam was the arrival of two Portuguese Jewish entrepreneurs, the brothers Abraham and Isaac Pereyra. They hired Rabbi Manasseh to direct a small college or academy (a yeshibah in Spanish-Portuguese parlance of the time) they had founded in the city.

In 1644, Menasseh met Antonio de Montezinos, a Portuguese traveler and Marrano Sephardic Jew who had been in the New World. Montezinos convinced him of his conclusion that the South America Andes' Indians were the descendants of the lost ten tribes of Israel. This purported discovery gave a new impulse to Menasseh's Messianic hopes, as the settlement of Jews throughout the world was supposed to be a sign that the Messiah would come. Filled with this idea, he turned his attention to England, whence the Jews had been expelled since 1290. He worked to get them permission to settle there again and thus hasten the Messiah's coming.

With the start of the Commonwealth of England, the question of the readmission of the Jews had found increased Puritan support, but it was often mooted under the growing desire for religious liberty. In addition, Messianic and other mystic hopes were then current in England. His book, The Hope of Israel, was first published in Amsterdam in Latin (Spes Israelis) and in Spanish (Esperança de Israel) in 1650. The book was written in response to a 1648 letter from John Dury enquiring about Montezinos' claims. In addition to reporting Montezinos' accounts of Jews in the Americas, the book also expressed the hope that the Jews would return to England as a way of hastening the coming of the messiah. Menasseh also stresses his kinship with parliament, and explains himself as driven by amity for England rather than financial gain. (Note: Hope of Israel was translated into English by Moses Wall, a millenarian and friend of Milton. Wall both supported the book's millennial themes and believed in God's special favour for the Jews, which he based on the writings of Thomas Brightman.)

In 1651 he offered to serve Christina, Queen of Sweden as her agent of Hebrew books. The same year he met Oliver St John and his envoys on his mission to secure an Anglo-Dutch coalition (which would have given Dutch citizens, and thus Jews, privileges to stay and work in England). The English were impressed by learning and manner, and advised him to formally apply for Jewish readmission to England. In 1652 The Hope of Israel was translated from Latin into English by John Dury or one of his associates, and it was published in London by Moses Wall, prefixed with a dedication to the Parliament and the Council of State; his account of descendants of the Lost Tribes being found in the New World deeply impressed public opinion and stirred up many polemics in English literature. This included a debate between Edward Spencer and Moses Wall, an MP and a scholar respectively, on ben Israel's millennial claims and the manner in which the Jews would be converted. Wall and Spencer's letters were printed in later additions of the book. Despite their historic misfortunes and movements, Menasseh characterizes the condition of Jewry at the time by saying:

Hence it may be seen that God hath not left us; for if one persecutes us, another receives us civilly and courteously; and if this prince treats us ill, another treats us well; if one banisheth us out of his country, another invites us with a thousand privileges; as divers princes of Italy have done, the most eminent King of Denmark, and the mighty Duke of Savoy in Nissa. And do we not see that those Republiques do flourish and much increase in trade who admit the Israelites?

Oliver Cromwell was sympathetic to the Jewish cause, partly because of his tolerant leanings but chiefly because he foresaw the importance for English commerce of the participation of the Jewish merchant princes, some of whom had already made their way to London. At this juncture, the English gave Jews full rights in the colony of Surinam, which they had controlled since 1650. There is some debate among historians concerning whether Menasseh's motives for pursuing the readmission of the Jews by England were primarily political or religious. Ismar Schorsch, for example, has argued that the idea of England being a final place for Jews to inhabit to bring about the coming of the Messiah was hardly present in The Hope of Israel (1652), but rather was developed by Menasseh later (1656–57 when he was in London) to appeal to English Christians with Millenarian beliefs. Henry Méchoulan, on the other hand, in his later in-depth detailed analysis of the book has striven to show that the Jewish messianic theme in it is also rather fundamental to its initial conception. Steven Nadler, in his 2018 book, which is actually the last word on Menasseh's biography to be published to date, has seemingly also closed the debate on this issue of Menasseh's own messianic beliefs:

They [the sundry European Gentile Millenarians that were in contact with him] especially valued [Menasseh] as the Jewish expositor of a common [Jewish-Christian] Messianic vision, wherein the worldly empires will be swept away by a "Fifth Kingdom" [or Fifth Monarchy] ruled by a savior sent by God.

In November 1655, Menasseh arrived in London. During his absence from the Netherlands, the Amsterdam rabbis excommunicated his student, Baruch Spinoza. In London, Menasseh published his Humble Addresses to the Lord Protector, but its effect was weakened by William Prynne's publication of Short Demurrer. Cromwell summoned the Whitehall Conference in December of the same year.

Some of the most notable statesmen, lawyers, and theologians of the day were summoned to this conference to discuss whether the Jews should be readmitted to England. The chief practical result was the declaration of judges Glynne and Steele that "there was no law which forbade the Jews' return to England" (as they had been expelled by royal decree of King Edward I, and not by formal parliamentary action; Jews remaining in England lived, however, under constant threat of expulsion). Though nothing was done to regularize the position of the Jews, the door was opened to their gradual return. On 14 December 1655, John Evelyn entered in his Diary, "Now were the Jews admitted." (Note: John Evelyn's diary entry for 14 December 1655. I visited Mr. Hobbes, the famous philosopher of Malmesbury, with who I had been long acquainted in France. Now were the Jews admitted.) When Prynne and others attacked the Jews, Menasseh wrote his major work, Vindiciae judaeorum (1656), in response.

Menasseh ben Israel stayed in England for close to two years after the Whitehall Conference. During this time he tried to obtain written permission for the resettlement of the Jews in England. Although he failed in this endeavour, during his stay he met with a large number of influential figures of the age, including Cambridge theologian Ralph Cudworth, Henry Oldenburg, Robert Boyle and his sister, Adam Boreel, John Sadler, John Dury and Samuel Hartlib, as well as more marginal prophetic figures such as Ambrose Barnes and Arise Evans. Ben Israel's stay was managed by the millenarian philosemite Baptist clergyman Henry Jessey.

== Death and burial ==
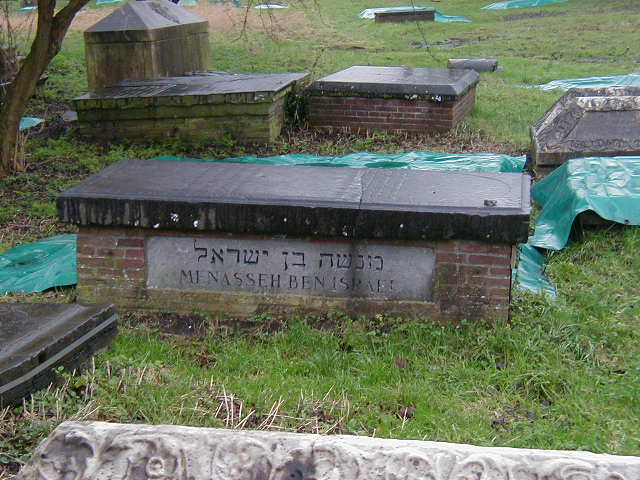
Menasseh's grave in Ouderkerk aan de Amstel

In February 1657 Cromwell granted ben Israel a state pension of £100, but he died before enjoying it, at Middelburg in the Netherlands in the winter of 1657 (14 Kislev 5418). He was conveying the body of his son Samuel home for burial.

His grave is in the Beth Haim of Ouderkerk aan de Amstel. and remains intact (headstone and gravestone).

== Writings ==
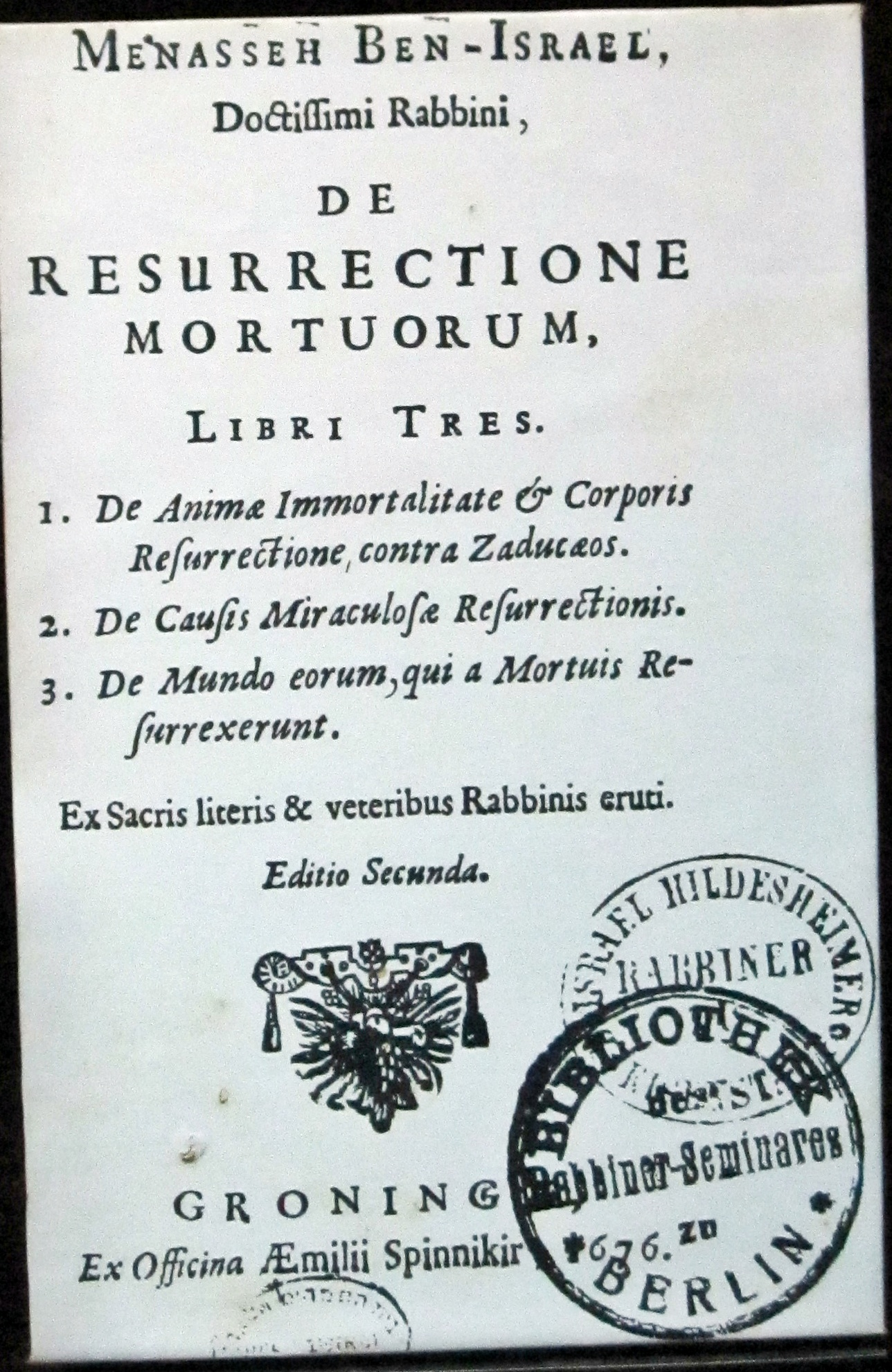
De Resurrectione Mortuorum by Menassah Ben Israel

Menasseh ben Israel was the author of many works. His major work Nishmat Hayim is a treatise in Hebrew on the Jewish concept of reincarnation of souls, published by his son Samuel six years before they both died. Some scholars think that he studied kabbalah with Abraham Cohen de Herrera, a disciple of Israel Saruk. This would explain his familiarity with the method of Isaac Luria.

The Conciliator was, as above, a work written to reconcile the apparent contradictions in numerous passages throughout the Bible. To achieve this aim, Ben Israel "utilized an astounding range of sources"; primarily the Talmud and the classic Jewish commentaries but frequently quotes from the early Christian authorities as well as Greek and Latin authors of antiquity. Written in Spanish, in Amsterdam, 1632, it was aimed primarily to strengthen the faith of the Marranos in the veracity of the Tanach according to Jewish interpretation. It was translated by Elias Haim Lindo and published by Duncan and Malcolm, in 1842, and again in 1972, with footnotes and introductory material by Sepher-Hermon Press.

His other works include:

- De Termino Vitae written in Latin 1639, translated into English by Thomas Pocock (London, 1709)
- De Creatione Problemata XXX, written in Latin ,1635, first English translation introduced by Seymour Feldman translated by Yannik Pisanne and Walter Hilliger. Menasseh Ben Israel, Thirty Problems Concerning Creation, New York, 2023, Shehakol, ISBN 978-1-7356737-9-0 and in French ISBN 978-2-494509-02-3
- De Resurrectione Mortuorum, Book I 1636 – written originally in Spanish but later translated into Latin, 1636 First English Translation, by Walter Hilliger, ISBN 978-1-7356737-6-9, and in modern Spanish, ISBN 1-7356737-7-3, both digital versions available on Sefaria.
- De la Fragilidad Humana (On Human Frailty) (1642)
- Nishmat Hayyim Hebrew
- a ritual compendium Thesouros dos dinim.
- Piedra gloriosa – with four engraved etchings by his acquaintance Rembrandt, who is also thought by some to have painted his portrait. These are preserved in the British Museum.
- The Hope of Israel (London 1652). Printed in Lucien Wolf (ed.), Manasseh ben Israel's Mission to Oliver Cromwell (London 1901), p. 50–51.
- Vindiciae Judaeorum, Or, A Letter in Answer to Certain Questions Propounded by a Noble and Learned Gentleman: Touching the Reproaches Cast on the Nation of the Jews; Wherein All Objections are Candidly, and Yet Fully Clear'd. Amsterdam 1656.

Other works can be found in the Biblioteca Nacional do Rio de Janeiro, Brazil, for example:

- Orden de las oraciones del mes, con lo mes necessario y obligatorio de las tres fiestas del año. Como tambien lo que toca a los ayunos, Hanucah, y Purim: con sus advertencias y notas para mas facilidad, y clareza. Industria y despeza de Menasseh ben Israel

== Descendants ==
Menasseh's wife, Rachel, was a descendant of the Abarbanel family. Menasseh had three children by her. According to family legend, the Abarbanels were descendants of King David, and he was proud of his children's Davidic ancestry. Both of Menasseh's sons predeceased their father. Menasseh's eldest son was Samuel Abarbanel Soeiro, also known as Samuel Ben Israel, who worked as a printer and assisted his father with matters in England. He died in 1657. Menasseh's youngest son, Joseph, died at age 20, in 1650, on a disastrous business trip to Poland. Menasseh also had a daughter, Gracia, born 1628, who married Samuel Abarbanel Barboza in 1646, and died in 1690.

Moses Jacob Ezekiel, the American sculptor, in his autobiography claimed to be a descendant of Menasseh Ben Israel. His claim is unconfirmed.

== See also ==
- Isaac La Peyrère
