= Exchequer of the Jews =

Division of the Court of Exchequer

The Exchequer of the Jews (Latin: Scaccarium Judaeorum) was a division of the Court of Exchequer at Westminster which recorded and regulated the taxes and the law-cases of the Jews in England and Wales. It operated from the late 1190s until the eventual expulsion of the Jews in 1290.

== Background ==
Jews began to settle in England soon after the Norman Conquest in 1066. For the most part they escaped the massacres during the First (1096–1099) and Second (1145–1149) Crusades, and despite occasional imposition of fines and special levies, their numbers and prosperity increased under the protection of the king.

There was a reason the Crown protected Jews. Surviving records of the Exchequer Pipe Roll of the reign of Henry I show that the Jews of England were a major source of revenue to the Crown early in the twelfth century. "The intent was to use the Jewry as a reservoir equally open to receive and closed to retain the surplus wealth of the surrounding population, so that the Crown will never lack a fund on which to draw in an hour of need". Jews were allowed to charge usury providing tax revenues to the Crown.

With the further advance of commerce and industry under Henry I and Henry II, the Jews of England continued to increase their royal revenues; and the demand grew for the creation of a distinct department of the Great Exchequer for the management of Jewish capital.

== Origins ==
The first special exchequer appears to have been created to manage the large estate left by Aaron of Lincoln (died 1186), which needed a treasurer and clerk to look after it. The institution was called "Aaron's Exchequer." The riots following Richard I's accession showed the danger such property was liable to if no record was kept of the debts owed to the Jews. Accordingly, Richard in 1194 ordered that duplicates should be taken of all Jewish debt records and kept in this or in other central repositories: "All the debts, pledges, mortgages, lands, houses, rents, and possessions of the Jews shall be registered ... no contract shall be made with, nor payment, made to, the Jews, nor any alteration made in the charters, except before the said persons".

It was soon afterward found necessary to have a centre for the whole of Jewish business, and this was attached to the Exchequer of Westminster and called the "Exchequer of the Jews". The first recorded mention of this is in 1200, when four "justices of the Jews" were named, two of them being Jews, Benedict de Talemunt and Joseph Aaron. These justices had the status of barons of the Exchequer, and were under the treasurer and chief justice. They were assisted by a clerk and escheator; Jews might hold these offices, but, excepting the two mentioned above, none ever became justice of the Jews. The justices were aided in their deliberations by the presbyter judaeorum, who doubtless assisted them in deciding questions of Jewish law which may have come before them.

== Definition and description ==
The details of the institution are clearly stated in the 1194 orders of Richard I, stating as follows:

All the debts, pledges, mortgages, lands, houses, rents, and possessions of the Jews shall be registered. The Jew who shall conceal any of these shall forfeit to the King his body and the thing concealed, and likewise all his possessions and chattels, neither shall it be lawful to the Jew to recover the thing concealed. Likewise six or seven places shall be provided in which they shall make all their contracts, and there shall be appointed two lawyers that are Christians and two lawyers that are Jews, and two legal registrars, and before them and the clerks of William of the Church of St. Mary's and William of Chimilli, shall their contracts be made.

And charters shall be made of their contracts by way of indenture. And one part of the indenture shall remain with the Jew, sealed with the seal of him, to whom the money is lent, and the other part shall remain in the common chest: wherein there shall be three locks and keys, whereof the two Christians shall keep one key, and the two Jews another, and the clerks of William of the Church of St Mary and of William of Chimilli shall keep the third. And moreover, there shall be three seals to it, and those who keep the seals shall put the seals thereto.

Moreover the clerks of the said William and William shall keep a roll of the transcripts of all the charters, and as the charters shall be altered so let the roll be likewise. For every charter there shall be three pence paid, one moiety thereof by the Jews and the other moiety by him to whom the money is lent; whereof the two writers shall have two pence and the keeper of the roll the third.

And from henceforth no contract shall be made with, nor payment, made to, the Jews, nor any alteration made in the charters, except before the said persons or the greater part of them, if all of them cannot be present. And the aforesaid two Christians shall have one roll of the debts or receipts of the payments which from henceforth are to be made to the Jews, and the two Jews one and the keeper of the roll one.

Moreover every Jew shall swear on his Roll, that all his debts and pledges and rents, and all his goods and his possessions, he shall cause to be enrolled, and that he shall conceal nothing as is aforesaid. And if he shall know that anyone shall conceal anything he shall secretly reveal it to the justices sent to them, and that they shall detect, and shew unto them all falsifiers or forgers of the charters and clippers of money, where or when they shall know them, and likewise all false charters ...

The creation of a separate institution to deal with the monies of the Jews was not wholly unique for those times. The Jews of England enjoyed a qualified autonomy by the hands of the king in several additional matters. For example, they had latitude in rate of the interest for loans they gave (though some records show a maximum limit), as well as in juridical matters. Also, cases where Jews alone were concerned were given leeway to be left to the cognizance of the Jews' own tribunals.

== Functions ==
The Exchequer of the Jews dealt with the lawcases arising between Jews and Christians, mainly with reference to the debts due the former. It claimed exclusive jurisdiction in these matters, but many exceptions occurred. In 1250, pleas of disseizin of tenements in the City of London were handed over to the mayor's court, and at times cases of this kind were brought before the ordinary justices in eyre or the hundred-court. It was before this court of the Jewish Exchequer that in 1257 the trial of Chief Rabbi Elyas of London took place. Moreover, the court assessed the contributions of the Jews to the royal treasury in reliefs (comprising one-third of the estate of a deceased Jew), escheats (forfeited to the king for capital offenses), fines (for licenses and concessions), and tallages, or general taxes applied for arbitrarily by the king.

In connection with the tallage, the justices periodically ordered a "scrutiny" of the lists of the debts contained in the archae or chests in which Jewish chirographs and starrs were preserved in each regional centre. Each chest had three locks, with one set of keys held by two designated Jews, one set by two designated Christians, and the third by two royal clerks; so they could only be opened if all three acted together. The chests themselves, or more frequently the lists held by the royal clerks of the debts contained in them, were sent up for "scrutiny" to Westminster, where the justices would report to the king as to the capability of the Jewry to bear further tallage. In the middle of the thirteenth century the number of such archae was reduced to twenty-five. Arrears of tallage were continually applied for, and if not paid the Jew's wife and children were often imprisoned as hostages, or he himself was sent to the Tower and his lands and chattels were distrained.

The Exchequer of the Jews was one of the means which enabled the kings to bring pressure upon the lesser baronage, who therefore claimed in 1251 the right to elect one of the justices of the Jews. These were at first men of some distinction, like Hugh Bigod, Philip Basset, and Henry de Bath. During the early reign of Henry III the justices were mainly appointed by Hubert de Burgh, but later on they were creatures of the king's favorites, as in the case of Robert Passelewe. During Edward I's rule justices held their posts for a very short time, and in 1272 and 1287 they were dismissed for corruption, handsome presents having been made to them, nominally for the use of the king, in order to expedite the legal proceedings. The court did not survive the expulsion, though cases with references to the debts of the Jews occurred in the year-books up to the reign of Edward II.

== Deeds and cases ==
The deeds entered in the Jewish Exchequer were mainly the chirographs recording and the starrs annulling indebtedness to the Jews. It was suggested by William Blackstone in 1769 that the notorious Star Chamber received its name from being the depository for the latter class of deeds, but this etymology is refuted by modern scholarship. The tax-lists for the tallages were made out by the Jewish assistants of the Exchequer, who were acquainted with the financial condition of each Jew on the list; many of these lists still exist. Various pleas entered by Jew or Christian dealt with the rate of interest, its lapse during the minority of an heir, the alleged forgeries of chirographs, and the like, and were recorded on the plea rolls of the Exchequer. A volume of the more important of these was published in 1902 jointly by the Selden Society and the Jewish Historical Society of England.

== The end of the institution ==
The office of the Exchequer of the Jews survived for almost a century. The expulsion of England's Jewry in 1290 signaled the end of the office of Exchequer of the Jews, though some cases with reference to the debts of the Jews can be found in some year-books through the reign of Edward II (1284–1327).

== Historical perspective: medieval culture and views of minorities ==
At first glance it could seem as if what drove the persecution of Jews were unique acts of pure anti-Semitism directed towards the Jewish population of medieval England. However, a close comparative reading sheds light to the reality that such persecution was not unique to the treatment of Jews but reflected a historical "system" of blaming "aliens" or various minority groups for daily misfortunes and difficulties (e.g. sudden diseases, poverty and famine, wars, or forces of nature etc.)

Much of the time mass accusations and persecution of minority groups were justified in the name of God (and/or attributed the evil doings of the 'designated minority group' in the name of the devil). Similar justification was used in the persecution of the Jews during England's crusade mania. As mentioned in Ginzburg's book, Ecstasies: Deciphering the Witches' Sabbath: "The lepers' extermination was the first time in the history of Europe that such huge programme of segregation was undertaken". "In succeeding centuries other protagonists would take the lepers' place, the mad, the poor, the criminal and Jews. The lepers led the way."

Ginzburg describes "the casual chain of conspiracy", which was fed by hostilities towards the least protected groups. In his view there was almost always a Muslim sovereign at the head of the chain: "Directly or indirectly these Muslim characters conspire with isolated figures or with groups, marginal from a geographical or ethnic-religious point of view (e.g. Jews), promising them money in exchange of execution of the plot". The plot is materially executed by other groups (e.g. lepers), who because of their age, their social inferiority or both of these reasons, are readily susceptible to false promises of wealth and power.

Conspiracies often included fiscal segregation in ghettoes for both Jews and lepers, and an additional obligation to wear a symbol on clothes to be recognized by, or to be subjected to a certain dress code.

Jews and lepers were both vulnerable to persecution. However, the most noticeable difference between Jews and other minorities was the Jews' wealth. As Ginzburg puts it: "We would doubtless have been exterminated, had not our great wealth made the Christians greedy enough to demand ransom". Several times during pogroms against minorities, following one conspiracy or another, the Jews ended up subjected to less killing or damage. The main source of punishment pointed at them was usually a requisition of all the wealth the Jews were holding.

== Medieval sources and possible bias ==
Information about the Exchequer of the Jews, its development, background, purpose, and use, was found exclusively in the Christian chronicles' records of those centuries. Although known for their remarkable accuracy and their credibility, these historians nonetheless had little sympathy or charity to spare for the Jews, and some might have been outright hostile to them. Since the secular accounts of English Jewry from the time period are very scanty, one can only present the Christian viewpoint.

- Rigg, J. M., ed. (1902), Select pleas, starrs, and other records from the Rolls of the Exchequer of the Jews, A. D. 1220–1284

The Jewish Historical Society of England has subsequently undertaken publication of a full calendar (English-language summary) of the rolls, so far to 1281:

- Rigg, J. M., ed. (1905/1971), Calendar of the Plea Rolls of the Exchequer of the Jews Vol. I, Henry III, 1218–1272.
- Rigg, J. M., ed. (1910/1971), – Vol. II, Edward I, 1273–1275.
- Jenkinson, H., ed. (1929), – Vol. III, Edward I, 1275–1277.
- Richardson, H. G., ed. (/1972), – Vol. IV, Henry II, 1272; and Edward I, 1275–77.
- Cohen, S., ed. (1992), – Vol. V, Edward I, 1277–1279.
- Brand, Paul, ed. (2005), – Vol. VI, Edward I, 1279–1281.

The Selden Society has also produced a volume of contemporary case-summaries in their series The Earliest English Law Reports,

- Brand, Paul (2007), Eyre reports 1286–9 and undated Eyre reports, Exchequer of the Jews reports, pre-1290 assize reports, pre-1290 reports from unidentified courts and additional pre-1290 Common Bench reports

== See also ==
- History of the Jews in England
- History of the English fiscal system
