= History of the Jews in England =

The location of England (dark green) in the United Kingdom in Europe.

The history of the Jews in England can be reliably traced to the period following the Norman Conquest of 1066, when England became integrated with the European system for the first time since the Roman evacuation of 410 CE, and thus came to the awareness of the Jewish communities of Continental Europe. The first Jews probably came to England circa 70 CE during the time of Roman rule, but were probably wiped out in the tumultuous period that followed the Roman evacuation, when the Anglo-Saxons gradually took power from the Romano-Celts.

In 1290 King Edward I issued the Edict of Expulsion, expelling all Jews from the Kingdom of England. After the expulsion, there was no overt Jewish community (as opposed to individuals practising Judaism secretly) until the rule of Oliver Cromwell. While Cromwell never officially readmitted Jews to the Commonwealth of England, a small colony of Sephardic Jews living in London was identified in 1656 and allowed to remain. The Jewish Naturalisation Act 1753, an attempt to legalise the Jewish presence in England, remained in force for only a few months. Historians commonly date Jewish emancipation to either 1829 or 1858, while Benjamin Disraeli, born a Sephardi Jew but converted to Anglicanism, had been elected twice as the prime minister of the United Kingdom in 1868 and in 1874. At the insistence of Irish leader Daniel O'Connell, in 1846 the Irish law "De Judaismo", which prescribed a special dress for Jews, was repealed.

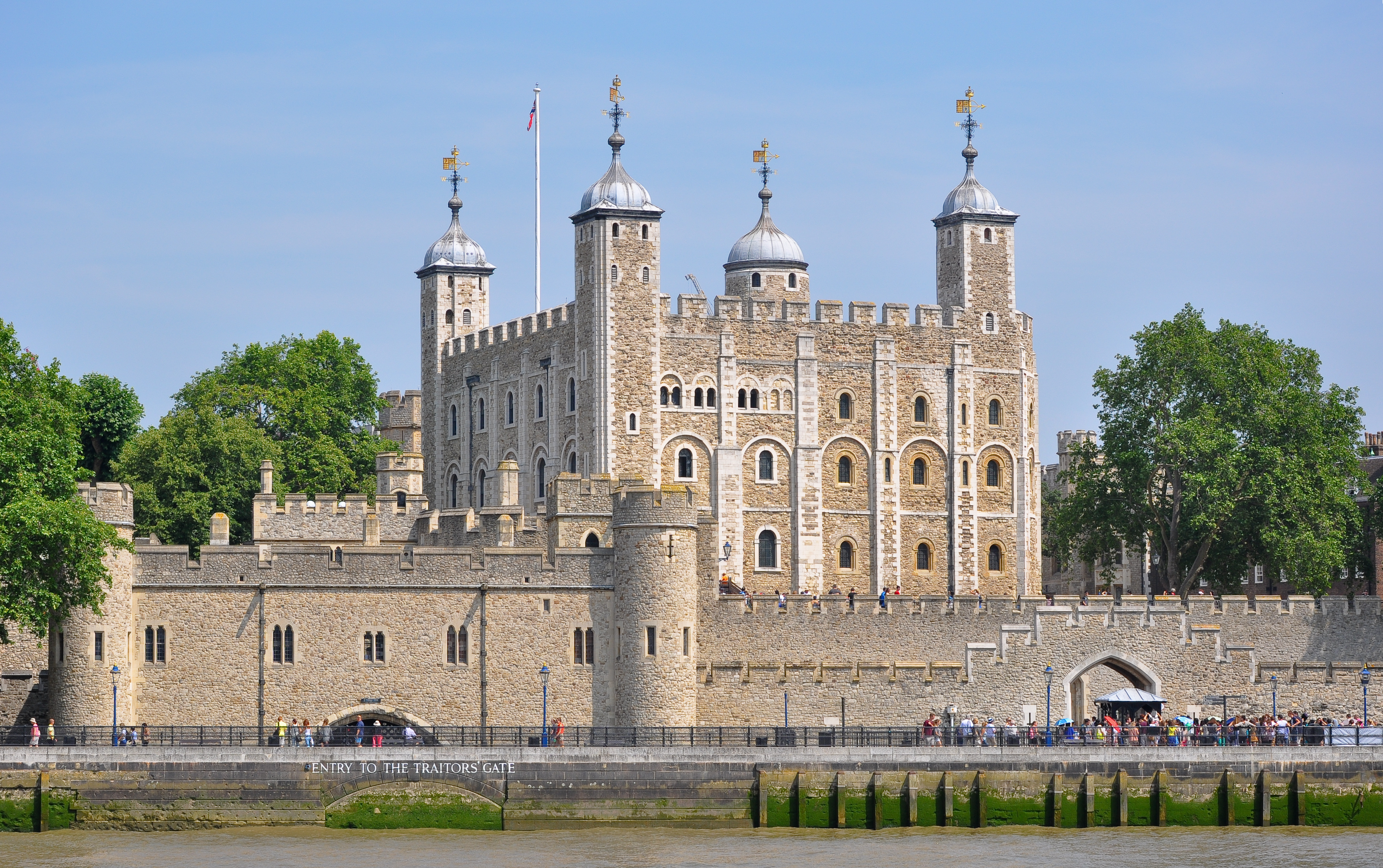
The Tower was a refuge for the Jews of medieval London.

Due to the rarity of anti-Jewish violence in Britain in the 19th century, it acquired a reputation for religious tolerance and attracted significant immigration from Eastern Europe. By 1939, about half a million European Jews had fled to England to escape the Nazis, but only about 70,000 (including almost 10,000 children) were granted entry. Jews faced antisemitism and stereotypes in Britain, and antisemitism "in most cases went along with Germanophobia" during World War I to the extent that Jews were equated with Germans, despite the British royal family having partial German ethnic origins. This led many Ashkenazi Jewish families to Anglicise their often German-sounding names.

In the 21st century, Jews in the UK now number around 275,000, with over 260,000 of these in England. The UK contains the second largest Jewish population in Europe (behind France) and the fifth largest Jewish community worldwide. The majority of the Jews in England live in and around London, with almost 160,000 Jews in London itself and a further 20,800 in nearby Hertfordshire, primarily in Bushey (4,500), Borehamwood (3,900), and Radlett (2,300). The next most significant population is in Greater Manchester with a community of slightly more than 25,000, primarily in Bury (10,360), Salford (7,920), Manchester itself (2,725), and Trafford (2,490). There are also significant communities in Leeds (6,760), Gateshead (3,000), Brighton (2,730), Liverpool (2,330), Birmingham (2,150), and Southend (2,080).

== Roman Britain ==
It is probable that there were Jews in Roman Britain under the Roman Empire, perhaps as soldiers, slaves, silversmiths or traders. However, there is little or no definitive evidence. One piece of circumstantial evidence is from a tradition in Caerleon (in Wales), a major legionary base, of two Roman-era Christian martyrs, Julius and Aaron, with the name Aaron suggesting Jewish origin.

== Norman England, 1066–1290 ==
William of Malmesbury states that William the Conqueror brought Jews from Rouen to England during the Norman Conquest. William the Conqueror's object may be inferred: his policy was to get feudal dues paid to the royal treasury in coin rather than in kind, and for this purpose it was necessary to have a body of men scattered through the country who would supply quantities of coin.

=== Status of Jews ===
Prior to their expulsion in 1290, the status of Jews in England was completely dependent on the will of the Crown. As a result of the Fourth Lateran Council in 1215, Christian authority, in the guise of the king, imposed certain discriminatory practices upon the Jews of England, one being the mandate on the wearing of a badge symbolising the two Tablets of Stone. The year 1215 also coincided with the two entries in the Magna Carta, dated 15 June, regarding debts due to Jews. In return for their economic function (providing credit as a source of revenue for the Crown), Jews were offered some privileges and protection under the jurisdiction of the king. As "royal serfs", they were allowed freedom of the king's highways, exemption from tolls, the ability to hold land directly from the king, and physical protection in the vast network of royal castles built to assert Norman authority.

The Jews of London were the responsibility of the Constable of the Tower and for this reason they were able to seek refuge in the Tower of London when at risk of mob violence. This was resorted to on a number of occasions, with large numbers staying there, sometimes for months at a time. There are records of a body of Jewish men-at-arms forming part of the garrison of the Tower in 1267, during a civil conflict, the Second Barons' War.

A clause to that effect was inserted under Henry I in some manuscripts of the so-called Leges Edwardi Confessoris ("Laws of Edward the Confessor"). Henry granted a charter to Rabbi Joseph, the chief Rabbi of London, and his followers. Under this charter, Jews were permitted to move about the country without paying tolls, to buy and sell, to sell their pledges after holding them a year and a day, to be tried by their peers, and to be sworn on the Torah rather than on a Christian Bible. Special weight was attributed to a Jew's oath, which was valid against that of twelve Christians. The sixth clause of the charter was especially important: it granted to Jews the right to move wherever they wanted, as if they were the king's own property ("sicut res propriæ nostræ"). As the king's property, English Jews could be mortgaged whenever the monarch needed to raise revenue and could be taxed without the permission of Parliament, eventually becoming the main taxpaying population.

English Jews experienced a "golden age" of sorts under Henry II in the late 12th century due to huge economic expansion and increased demand for credit. Major Jewish fortunes were made in London, Oxford, Lincoln, Bristol, and Norwich. The Crown, in turn, capitalized on the prosperity of its Jews. In addition to many arbitrary taxes, Richard I established the Ordinance of the Jewry in 1194 in an attempt to organize the Jewish community. It ensured that mandatory records would be kept by royal officials for all Jewish transactions. Every debt was recorded on a chirography to allow the king immediate and complete access to Jewish property. Richard also established a special exchequer to collect any unpaid debts due after the death of a Jewish creditor. The establishment of the Exchequer of the Jews eventually made all transactions of the English Jewry liable to taxation by the king in addition to the 10% of all sums recovered by Jews with the help of English courts. So, while the First and Second Crusades increased anti-Jewish sentiments, Jews in England went relatively unscathed beyond occasional fines and special levies. Though they did not experience the same kind of social mobility and cultural advancements that Jews under Muslim rule did, the Jews of England's population and prosperity increased under the protection of the king.

The status of Jews in England dramatically worsened with the consolidation of governmental authority as well as the deepening of popular piety in the late 12th century; further isolating Jews from the greater English community. Though rulers of both church and state exploited and monopolized on the advancements in commerce and industry of English Jews, popular anti-Jewish sentiments grew as a result of their prosperity and relationship with the king and the courts. External pressures such as the circulating myth of the blood libel, the religious tensions in light of the Crusades, and the interference of Pope Innocent III in the late 12th century created an increasingly violent environment for English Jews. Mob violence increased against the Jews in London, Norwich, and Lynn. Entire Jewries were murdered in York. Because of their financial utility, however, English Jews were still offered royal protection, and Richard I continued to renew orders to protect the Jews, formalizing the Exchequer and designating "archae", or centralized record chests monitored by panels of local Christian and Jewish key holders to better protect records of all Jewish transactions.

The incompetence of King John in the early 13th century depleted even the wealthiest Jews, and though they had more than a decade to recover, Henry III's equally mismanaged finances pressed roughly 70,000 pounds out of a population of only 5,000. To do so, they had to sell off many of their mortgage bonds to wealthy nobles. The Jews then became a focal point of those debtors' hatred and mass violence spiked again in the mid-13th century. Their legal status, however, did not change until Henry's son, Edward I, took control of the Jewries. He issued restrictive statutes, forbidding them from taking any more property into bond, the means by which they could lend money and how they lived. With almost all means of income denied them and property being confiscated, the Jewish population diminished. New waves of crusading zeal in the 1280s in conjunction with debt resentment pressured Edward into the expulsion of the depleted Jewish community in 1290.

=== Attitudes of the kings and the church ===
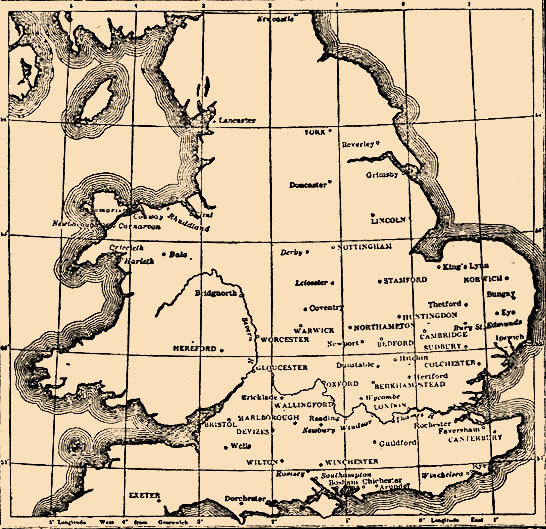
Jewish communities in Medieval England.

Gentile-Jewish relations in England were disturbed under King Stephen, who burned down the house of a Jew in Oxford (some accounts say with a Jew in it) because he refused to pay a contribution to the king's expenses. In 1144, came the first report in history of the blood libel against Jews; it came up in the case of William of Norwich (1144). Anthony Julius finds that the English were endlessly imaginative in inventing antisemitic allegations against the Jews. He contends that England became the "principal promoter, and indeed in some sense the inventor of literary anti-Semitism." In his 2010 book, Julius argues that blood libel is the key, because it incorporates the themes that Jews are malevolent, constantly conspiring against Christians, powerful, and merciless. Variations include stories about Jews poisoning wells, twisting minds, and buying and selling Christian souls and bodies.

While the Crusaders were killing Jews in Germany, outbursts against Jews in England were, according to Jewish chroniclers, prevented by King Stephen.

With the restoration of order under Henry II, Jews renewed their activity. Within five years of his accession Jews were found at London, Oxford, Cambridge, Norwich, Thetford, Bungay, Canterbury, Winchester, Stafford, Windsor, and Reading. Yet they were not permitted to bury their dead elsewhere than in London, a restriction which was not removed till 1177. Their spread throughout the country enabled the king to draw upon their resources as occasion demanded. He repaid them with demand notes on the sheriffs of the counties, who accounted for payments thus made in the half-yearly accounts on the pipe rolls (see Aaron of Lincoln). Strongbow's conquest of Ireland (1170) was in part financed by Josce, a Jew of Gloucester; and the king accordingly fined Josce, five pounds, for having lent money to those under his displeasure, pipe rolls also indicate Strongbow borrowed monies from Aaron of Lincoln. As a rule, however, Henry II does not appear to have limited in any way the financial activity of Jews. The favourable position of English Jews was shown, among other things, by the visit of Abraham ibn Ezra in 1158, by that of Isaac of Chernigov in 1181, and by the immigration to England of Jews who were exiled from the king's properties in France by Philip Augustus in 1182, among them probably being Judah Sir Leon of Paris.

In 1168, when concluding an alliance with Frederick Barbarossa, Henry II seized the chief representatives of the Jews and sent them to Normandy, and imposed a tallage on the rest of the community of 5,000 marks. When, however, he asked the rest of the country to pay a tithe for the Crusade against Saladin in 1188, he demanded a quarter of all Jewish chattels. The so-called "Saladin tithe" was reckoned at £70,000, the quarter at £60,000. In other words, the value of the personal property of Jews was regarded as one-fourth that of the whole country. It is improbable, however, that the whole amount was paid at once, as for many years after the imposition of the tallage, arrears were demanded from the recalcitrant Jews.

Aaron of Lincoln is believed to have been the wealthiest man in 12th century Britain. It is estimated that his wealth may have exceeded that of the king. The king had probably been led to make this large demand on English Jewry's money by the surprising windfall which came to his treasury at Aaron's death in 1186. All property obtained by usury, whether by Jew or by Christian, fell into the king's hands on the death of the usurer; Aaron of Lincoln's estate included £15,000 worth of debts owed to him. Besides this, Aaron's large fortune passed to King Henry but much of it was lost on the journey to the royal coffers in Normandy. A special branch of the treasury, known as "Aaron's Exchequer", was established in order to deal with this large account.

During the earlier years of Henry II's reign, Jews lived on good terms with their non-Jewish neighbours, including the clergy. They entered churches freely, and took refuge in the abbeys in times of commotion. Some Jews lived in opulent houses, and helped to build many of the abbeys and monasteries of the country. However, by the end of Henry's reign they had incurred the ill will of the upper classes. Anti-Jewish sentiment, fostered by the Crusades during the latter part of the reign of Henry, spread throughout the nation and began to be reflected in official policy.

During the thirteenth century, English monarchs were increasingly careless and finally actively hostile in their policies. This was in part due to changes in church policy, which was becoming increasingly hostile after the Fourth Lateran Council. The church demanded the separation of Jews and Christians as a means of arresting the spread of heretical ideas and interfaith sexual relations. To this end, as a means of identification, Jews were mandated to wear Jewish badges or the Jewish hat, as depicted in the Chapel of the Holy Sepulchre in Winchester Cathedral.

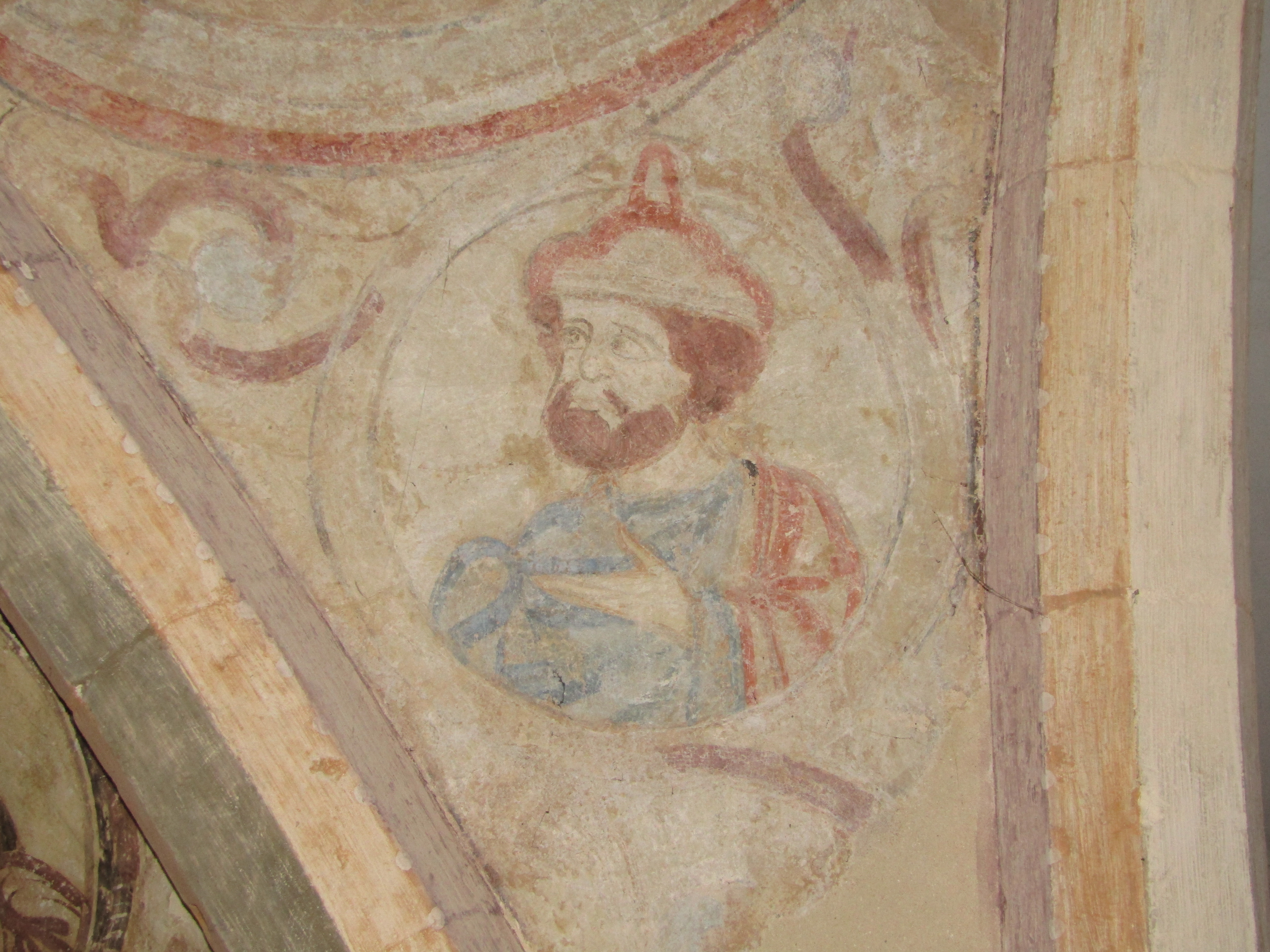
Jew of England, Chapel of the Holy Sepulchre, Winchester Cathedral

John and Henry III both overtaxed the Jews, regarding them as an easy source of income. The result was that Jews were forced by the crown to pull in all overdue debts, and as debt was generally secured against land, this meant dispossessing members of the middling gentry of the source of their feudal status, land. The crown's immediate allies, in their inner circle and court, benefited from these sales as they picked up these assets cheaply; Jews could not by law hold onto land holdings. This repeated cycle bred resentment and anti-Jewish sentiment, but monarchs continued this process until Jewish assets had in essence run out.

Henry III's official attitudes moved from protection to hostility when he became the first monarch to lend credence to a blood libel, when he ordered investigations and arrests of Jews concerning the death of a child, Hugh, in Lincoln. He was locally venerated, and stories about him this clearly circulated widely, including in prose and folk songs.

=== Persecution and expulsion ===
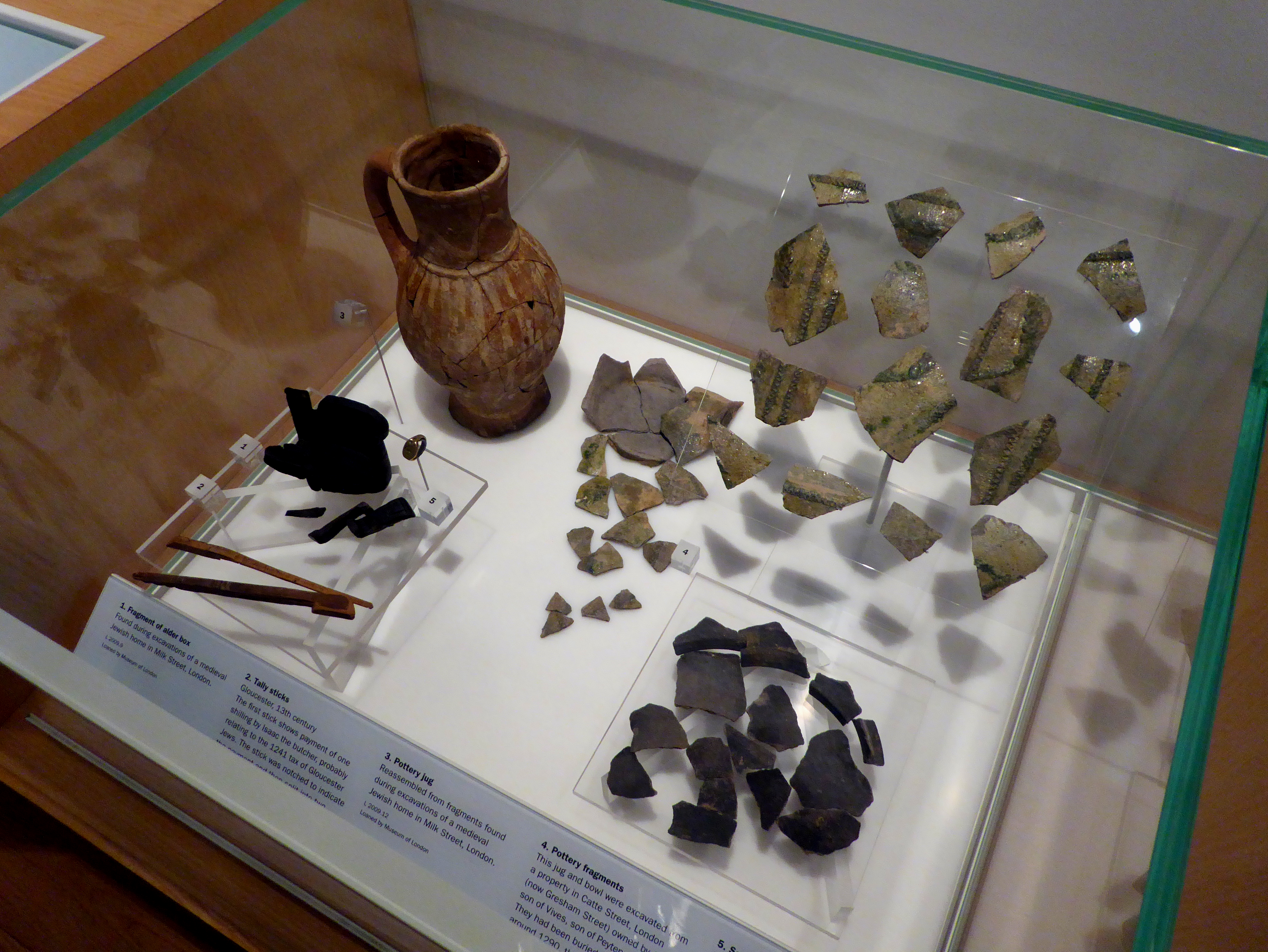
Artefacts from Jewish houses in medieval London, in display at the Jewish Museum London.

External audio
- The Medieval Massacre of the Jews of York, Speaking with Shadows, published by English Heritage, retrieved 10 November 2019

The persecution of England's Jews built up from the late twelfth century, and was brutal. Massacres were recorded in London, Northampton and York during the crusades in 1189 and 1190. The massacre at York was mentioned by William of Newburgh that it was carried out less for religious reasons, but instead for greed.

In 1269, Henry III made blasphemy by Jews a hanging offence, and when Edward returned from Crusade, he passed the Statute of the Jewry in 1275.

The number of Jews were around 2,000–3,000 in England by the 1270s. They were much less capable of generating income for the Crown, as they had been overtaxed and their capital was much eroded. Overtaxation inevitably led to overdue debts being foreclosed, meaning that the lands of middling Knights and gentry being bought up by the biggest landowners, notoriously including Queen Eleanor and other members of the court. This process had fuelled antisemitism among the forces opposing the crown centred around Simon de Montfort during Henry III's time. During the Second Barons' War in the 1260s, de Montfort's forces led a series of pogroms in many English cities where Jewish communities were attacked, and debt records captured and destroyed.

During Edward's reign, antisemitism moved from being used by opponents of the crown, to being "deliberately deployed and developed in the interests of the English state". While financial considerations may have played a part in his actions leading to the expulsion of the Jews, it is important to note Edward's "sincere religious bigotry". Shortly after Edward returned from the Crusades, in order to assuage concerns among the landed classes and in Parliament, he passed the Statute of the Jewry in 1275.

To finance his war against Wales in 1276, Edward I of England taxed Jewish moneylenders. When the moneylenders could no longer pay the tax, they were accused of disloyalty. Already restricted to a limited number of occupations, Edward abolished their "privilege" to lend money, restricted their movements and activities and forced Jews to wear a yellow patch.

On 17 November 1278, the heads of households of the Jews of England, believed to have numbered around 600 out of a population of 2,000–3,000, were arrested on suspicion of coin clipping and counterfeiting, and Jewish homes in England were searched. At the time, coin clipping was a widespread practice, which both Jews and Christians were involved in. A financial crisis had resulted in pressure to act against coin clippers. In 1275, coin clipping was made a capital offence, and in 1278, raids on suspected coin clippers were carried out. According to the Bury Chronicle, "All Jews in England of whatever condition, age or sex were unexpectedly seized ... and sent for imprisonment to various castles throughout England. While they were thus imprisoned, the innermost recesses of their houses were ransacked." Some 600 were detained in the Tower of London. More than 300 are known to have been executed in 1279, with 298 being killed in London alone. Some of those who could afford to buy a pardon and had a patron at the royal court escaped punishment.

Edward I increasingly showed antisemitism as, in 1280, he granted a right to levy a toll on the rivulet bridge at Brentford "for the passage of goods over it, with a special tax at the rate of 1d. each for Jews and Jewesses on horse, ½d. each on foot; other travellers were exempt". This antipathy eventually culminated in his legislating for the expulsion of all Jews from the country in 1290. Most were only allowed to take what they could carry. A small number of Jews favoured by the king were permitted to sell their properties first, though most of the money and property of these dispossessed Jews was confiscated. A monk, Gregory of Huntingdon, purchased all the Jewish texts he could to begin translating them, ensuring that at least some of what they had written and created was preserved.

From then until 1655, there is no official record of Jews in England outside the Domus Conversorum, with a few exceptions such as Jacob Barnet, who was ultimately arrested and exiled.

== Resettlement period, 1290 to 1800 ==
Between the expulsion of Jews in 1290 and their formal return in 1655, there are records of Jews in the Domus Conversorum up to 1551 and even later. An attempt was made to obtain a revocation of the edict of expulsion as early as 1310, but in vain. Notwithstanding, a certain number of Jews appeared to have returned; four complaints were made to the king in 1376 that some of those trading as Lombards were actually Jews.

Occasionally permits were given to individuals to visit England, as in the case of Elias Sabot (an eminent physician from Bologna summoned to attend Henry IV) in 1410, but it was not until the expulsion of the Jews from Spain in 1492 and Portugal in 1497 that any considerable number of Sephardic Jews found refuge in England. In 1542, many were arrested on the suspicion of being Jews, and, throughout the sixteenth century, a number of persons named Lopez, possibly all of the same family, took refuge in England, the best known of them being Rodrigo López, physician to Queen Elizabeth I, and who is said by some commentators to have been the inspiration for Shylock.

England also saw converts such as Immanuel Tremellius and Philip Ferdinand. Jewish visitors included Joachim Gaunse, who introduced new methods of mining into England and there are records of visits from Jews named Alonzo de Herrera and Simon Palache in 1614. The writings of John Weemes in the 1630s provided a positive view of the resettlement of the Jews in England, effected in 1657.

=== Henry VIII and Judaism ===
Over the course of his reign, Henry VIII showed interest in Judaism. During his attempt to annul his marriage to Catherine of Aragon, Henry's representatives consulted with notable Italian Jews, and he attempted to justify his annulment using laws from the Old Testament. Later in Henry's reign, Hebrew was first printed in England from 1524, while in 1549, the use of Hebrew was allowed to be used in private worship.

=== Hidden Jews in England ===
From the beginning of the 16th century, in the wake of the Spanish Inquisition, Jews began to return to England. Although Jews had to conceal their religion for fear of raising discourse, they needed only to conceal it loosely, and many Jews in England became known as Jews, despite their attempts to conceal their faith. Many hidden Jews made names for themselves while in England. One Marrano from Spain, Hector Nunes, played a vital role in English espionage by relaying intelligence from Spain to Queen Elizabeth's spymaster, Sir Francis Walsingham, on his merchant vessels. This information was instrumental in England's defeat of the Spanish Armada in 1588. Another Jew who made a name for himself in England was Joachim Gaunse of Bohemia, who came to England as a metallurgist and metal engineer to aid in their defeat of Spain. Because of his work, Sir Walter Raleigh invited Gaunse to sail with him on an expedition to North America, where he became the first Jew to set foot on North American soil.

Another Marrano gained attention in England for less patriotic reasons. Roderigo Lopez, who became personal physician to Elizabeth I, was allegedly bribed by the Spanish Crown to poison the Queen, and subsequently executed. This prompted a wave of anti-Jewish sentiment in England which had not been seen since the Jews' expulsion. In the wake of his trial, famous plays like William Shakespeare's The Merchant of Venice and Christopher Marlowe's The Jew of Malta were written, both of which depict Jews in negative, stereotypical manners.

Toward the middle of the 17th century, a considerable number of Marrano merchants settled in London and formed there a secret congregation, at the head of which was Antonio Fernandez Carvajal and Samuel Maylott, a French merchant, who has many descendants in England. They conducted a large business with the Levant, East and West Indies, Canary Islands, and Brazil, and above all with the Netherlands and Spain.

Francis Drake's quartermaster in his circumnavigation of the globe was named as "Moses the Jew". There is evidence of Jews resident in Plymouth in the 17th century.

=== Resettlement, 1655 ===
Prior to their resettlement, a growing philo-Semitism in England had turned the environment there into a more hospitable one for Jews. In the wake of the English Reformation, it became more popular for Anglicans to identify their practices and traditions with Jewish ones over Catholic ones. In 1607, Cambridge University received its first rabbi to teach Hebrew to students, and many of these students went on to translate the King James Bible. This translation of the Bible, for the first time, began to "dehellenize" biblical names. For example, Elias, as he had been called previously, became Elijah to sound more like the Hebrew pronunciation. Many Puritans showed great appreciation for these Old Testament names, and Puritan children were often named using the new Hebrew spellings. Puritans furthered the English appreciation of Judaism by adopting Jewish practices like strict observation of the Sabbath. When they challenged Anglican practices as being too similar to Catholic ones, Richard Hooker, a well-known Anglican theologian, was cunning enough to tie these practices to Jewish ones rather than Catholic ones in an attempt to silence the Puritan reformers' attacks. At the turn of the 17th century, Englishmen like Edwin Sandys and Laurence Aldersey began to show interest in Jewish culture, traveling to Jewish ghettos, visiting synagogues on the Sabbath, and comparing Jewish and Anglican practices in popular writings upon their returns. Oliver Cromwell believed the English to be one of the Ten Lost Tribes of Israel, and therefore entitled to the blessings promised in the Old Testament. Under his rule after the English Civil War, philo-Semitism flourished, making the climate right for Jews to propose their official readmission.

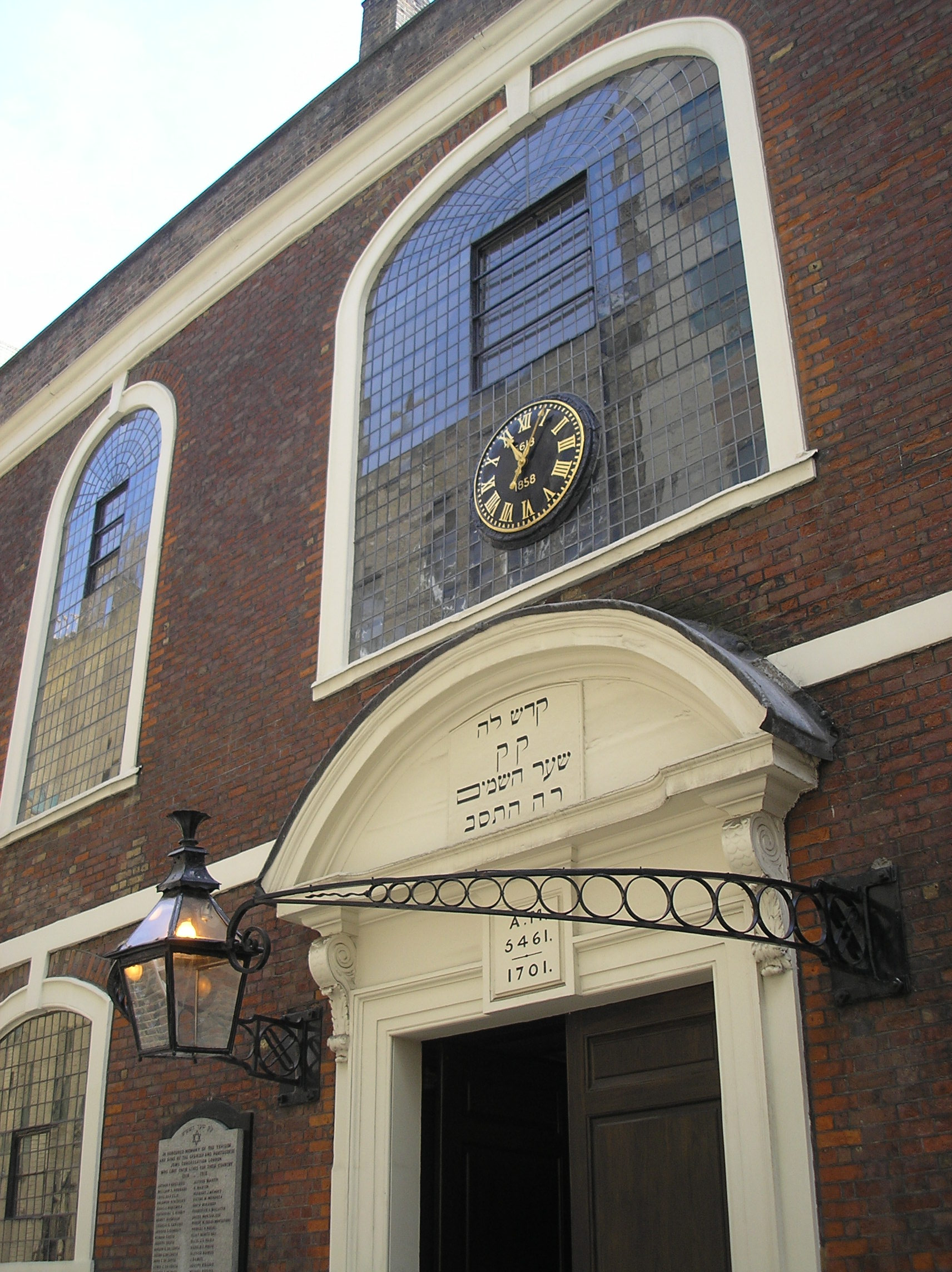
Bevis Marks Synagogue, the first synagogue of Spanish-Portuguese Jews, completed in 1701, oldest synagogue in the UK, was built by the first generation of readmitted Jews to England.

In the 1650s, Menasseh Ben Israel, a rabbi and leader of the Dutch Jewish community, approached Cromwell with the proposition that Jews should at long-last be readmitted to England. He agreed, and although he could not compel a council called for the purpose in December 1655 to consent formally to readmission, he made it clear that the ban on Jews would no longer be enforced. In the years 1655–56, the controversy over the readmission of Jews was fought out in a pamphlet war. The issue divided religious radicals and more conservative elements within society. The Puritan William Prynne was vehemently opposed to permitting Jews to return, the Quaker Margaret Fell no less passionately in favour, like John Wemyss, a minister of the Church of Scotland. In the end, Jews were readmitted in 1655, and, by 1690, about 400 Jews had settled in England. Emblematic of the progress in the social status of Jews was the knighting by William III of England in 1700 of Solomon de Medina, the first Jew to be so honoured.

=== 18th century ===
The Jewish Naturalisation Act 1753 received royal assent from George II on 7 July 1753 but was repealed in 1754 due to widespread opposition to its provisions.

During the Jacobite rising of 1745, the Jews had shown particular loyalty to the government. Their chief financier, Samson Gideon, had strengthened the stock market, and several of the younger members had volunteered in the corps raised to defend London. Possibly as a reward, Henry Pelham in 1753 brought in the Jew Bill of 1753, which allowed Jews to become naturalised by application to Parliament. It passed the Lords without much opposition, but on being brought down to the House of Commons, the Tories made a great outcry against this "abandonment of Christianity", as they called it. The Whigs, however, persisted in carrying out at least one part of their general policy of religious toleration, and the bill was passed and received royal assent (26 Geo. 2. c. 26).

In 1798, Nathan Mayer von Rothschild established a business in Manchester, and later N M Rothschild & Sons bank in London, having been sent to the UK by his father Mayer Amschel Rothschild (1744–1812). The bank funded Wellington in the Napoleonic Wars, financed the British government's 1875 purchase of Egypt's interest in the Suez Canal and funded Cecil Rhodes in the development of the British South Africa Company. Beyond banking and finance, members of the Rothschild family in UK became academics, scientists and horticulturalists with worldwide reputations.

Some English ports, such as Hull started to receive immigrants and trading "port Jews" from around 1750.

In the 1780s and '90s, English boxer Daniel Mendoza was an active prizefighter; Mendoza was of Sephardic or Portuguese Jewish descent.

== 19th century ==
=== Emancipation and personalities ===
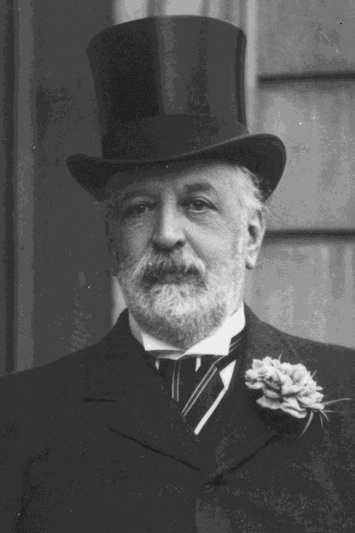
Nathan Mayer Rothschild, 1st Baron Rothschild (1840–1915).

With Catholic Emancipation in 1829, the hopes of the Jews rose high; and the first step toward a similar alleviation in their case was taken in 1830 when William Huskisson presented a petition signed by 2,000 merchants and others of Liverpool. This was immediately followed by a bill presented by Robert Grant on 15 April of that year which was destined to engage the Parliament in one form or another for the next thirty years.

In 1837, Queen Victoria knighted Moses Haim Montefiore; four years later, Isaac Lyon Goldsmid was made a baronet, the first Jew to receive a hereditary title. The first Jewish Lord Mayor of London, Sir David Salomons, was elected in 1855, followed by the 1858 emancipation of the Jews. On 26 July 1858, Lionel de Rothschild was finally allowed to sit in the British House of Commons when the law restricting the oath of office to Christians was changed; Benjamin Disraeli, a baptised Christian of Jewish parentage, was already an MP. In 1868, Disraeli became Prime Minister having earlier been Chancellor of the Exchequer. In 1884, Nathan Mayer Rothschild, 1st Baron Rothschild became the first Jewish member of the British House of Lords; again Disraeli was already a member. (Though born a Jew, Disraeli's baptism as a child qualified him as eligible for political aspirations, presenting no restrictions regarding a mandated Christian oath of office.) Disraeli as a leader of the Conservative Party, with its ties to the landed aristocracy, used his Jewish ancestry to claim an aristocratic heritage of his own. He was very proud of his Jewish heritage and published novels celebrating that heritage.

Anglo-Jewish leaders such as Chief Rabbi Nathan Adler sought to unify diverse congregations under institutional authority, organizing education, charity, and religious life through the United Synagogue (founded 1870). Sunday schools, benevolent societies, and burial clubs reflected both internal cohesion and adaptation to Victorian social norms. The Victorian Jewish community emphasized respectability, philanthropy, and education as routes to acceptance in broader British society. The very rich Rothschild, Montefiore, and Mocatta families played prominent roles as financiers and philanthropists, supporting hospitals, schools, and civic institutions. Typically the diverse Jewish communities sponsored numerous philanthropic efforts. See Jewish Board of Guardians and Jewish Care. Jewish participation in finance, commerce and clothing manufacturing contributed to the economy's modernization and to widespread favourable perceptions of Jews as industrious citizens. Cultural leaders like novelists Disraeli and Grace Aguilar and poet Amy Levy engaged with questions of faith, gender, and national belonging.

=== Community development ===
Emancipation from political restrictions began in the 18th century and progressed steadily with no reversals. By the mid-19th century, Jews in England had largely achieved legal emancipation. The process culminated in the admission of Lionel de Rothschild to Parliament in 1858 after a successful struggle for the right to affirm rather than swear Christian oaths. Jewish emancipation symbolized the liberalizing spirit of the Victorian state and affirmed Britain's self-image as a tolerant, constitutional monarchy. By 1890, Jewish emancipation was complete in every walk of life. The Jewish community enjoyed broad-scale acceptance, fully equal status, and historic barriers and limitations were gone.

By 1882, 46,000 Jews lived in England. The Jewish community was largely based in London with a presence in a few other major cities. There was some immigration from Germany. After the Russian anti-Jewish pogroms began in 1881, there was an influx of Jewish refugees from Eastern Europe. (The great majority of refugees went to New York City.) From the 1840s to 1900, Anglo-Jewry grew from about 20,000 to over 100,000.

Victorian Jewry was religiously pluralistic. Reform Judaism, influenced by German and Enlightenment ideals, emerged alongside the much larger Orthodox practice. By 1880, the flourishing Jewish community in Birmingham was centred on its synagogue. The men organised collective action to defend the reputation and promote the interests of the community. Rituals regarding funerals and burials brought together the rich and the poor, the men and the women. Intermarriage outside the community was uncommon. However, the arrival of East European Jews after 1880 caused a split between the older, assimilated, middle-class Anglicized Jews and the generally much poorer new immigrants who spoke Yiddish.

From 1858 to the 21st century, Parliament has never been without practising Jewish members. At this time, many of the Jews of the East End moved to more prosperous parts of East London such as Hackney (including Dalston and Stamford Hill), or to North London districts such as Stoke Newington and Canonbury.

Several synagogues were built as large, architecturally elaborate classical, romanesque, Italianate or Victorian gothic buildings such as Singers Hill Synagogue, in Birmingham.

=== Antisemitism ===
There was some antisemitism, but far less than in other major European countries such as Russia, Germany and France. Historians have explored how antisemitic stereotypes persisted in Victorian popular culture and literature. Jews were sometimes caricatured as morally suspect in newspapers and novels, reflecting anxieties about immigration and capitalism. The depiction of Shylock in theatrical revivals and the social disquiet surrounding East End immigrants in the 1880s revealed some prejudice existed within the framework of tolerance. Sustained Jewish participation in civic life gradually challenged and reshaped public attitudes toward religious minorities.

== Modern times ==
=== 1880s to 1920 ===
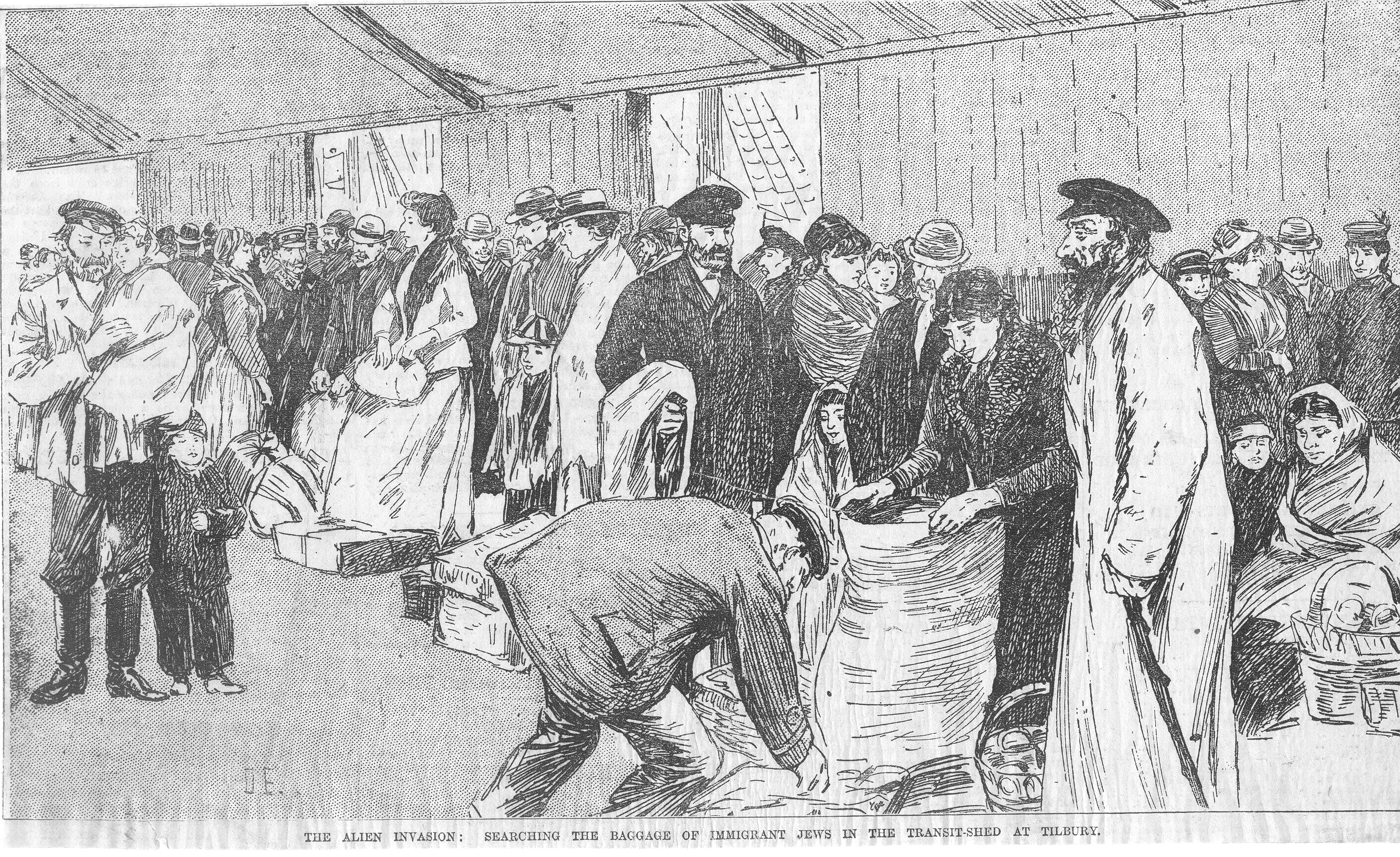
Immigrant Jews in the transit shed at Tilbury (c. 1891). This illustration is captioned "The Alien Invasion".

From the 1880s to the early part of the 20th century, massive pogroms and the May Laws in Russia caused many Jews to flee the Pale of Settlement. Of the East European Jewish emigrants, 1.9 million (80 percent) headed to the United States, and 140,000 (7 percent) to Britain. The chief mechanism was chain migration in which the first successful member(s) of the chain send information, local currency (and sometimes tickets or money for tickets) to later arrivals. These Ashkenazi Jews were funnelled by the railways of Europe to its North Sea and Baltic ports, and entered England via London, Hull, Grimsby and Newcastle. The Jewish communities of the Northern ports were swelled both by transient and temporary migrants, bound for New York, Buenos Aires, the Cape, as well as London and other British cities.

The Jewish population increased from 46,000 in 1880 to about 250,000 in 1919. They lived primarily in the large industrial cities, especially London, Manchester and Leeds. Until the late 20th century, East London was the main centre of Jewish life in England, with settlement heavily focused on an area in and around Whitechapel, extending from Bishopsgate to Cable Street. The area was chosen because of its cheap rents and the independent trades, notably weaving and textiles, known colloquially as "the rag trade". The district of Spitalfields lay within this area and gained the nickname Little Jerusalem.

Manchester, and neighbouring Salford, were also areas of Jewish settlement, particularly the Strangeways, Cheetham and Broughton districts. Unlike much of the Jewish community in Poland, the Jewish community in England generally embraced assimilation into wider English culture. They started Yiddish and Hebrew newspapers and youth movements such as the Jewish Lads' Brigade. Immigration was eventually restricted by the Aliens Act 1905, following pressure from groups such as the British Brothers' League. The 1905 legislation was followed by the Aliens Restriction (Amendment) Act 1919.

In 1917, Walter Rothschild, 2nd Baron Rothschild set up the conditions for the Balfour Declaration, which promised a homeland in Palestine for Jews in a new Zionist State.

==== Marconi Scandal (1912–1913) ====
The Marconi scandal brought issues of antisemitism into the political arena, on the basis that senior ministers in the Liberal government had secretly profited from advanced knowledge of deals regarding wireless telegraphy. Some of the key players were Jewish. Historian Todd Endelman identifies Catholic writers as central critics:

"The most virulent attacks in the Marconi affair were launched by Hilaire Belloc and the brothers Cecil and G. K. Chesterton, whose hostility to Jews was linked to their opposition to liberalism, their backward-looking Catholicism, and their nostalgia for a medieval Catholic Europe that they imagined was ordered, harmonious, and homogeneous. The Jew baiting at the time of the Boer War and the Marconi scandal was linked to a broader protest, mounted in the main by the Radical wing of the Liberal Party, against the growing visibility of successful businessmen in national life and their challenge to what were seen as traditional English values."

Historian Frances Donaldson says, "If Belloc's feeling against the Jews was instinctive and under some control, Chesterton's was open and vicious, and he shared with Belloc the peculiarity that the Jews were never far from his thoughts."

==== World War I and Balfour Declaration ====
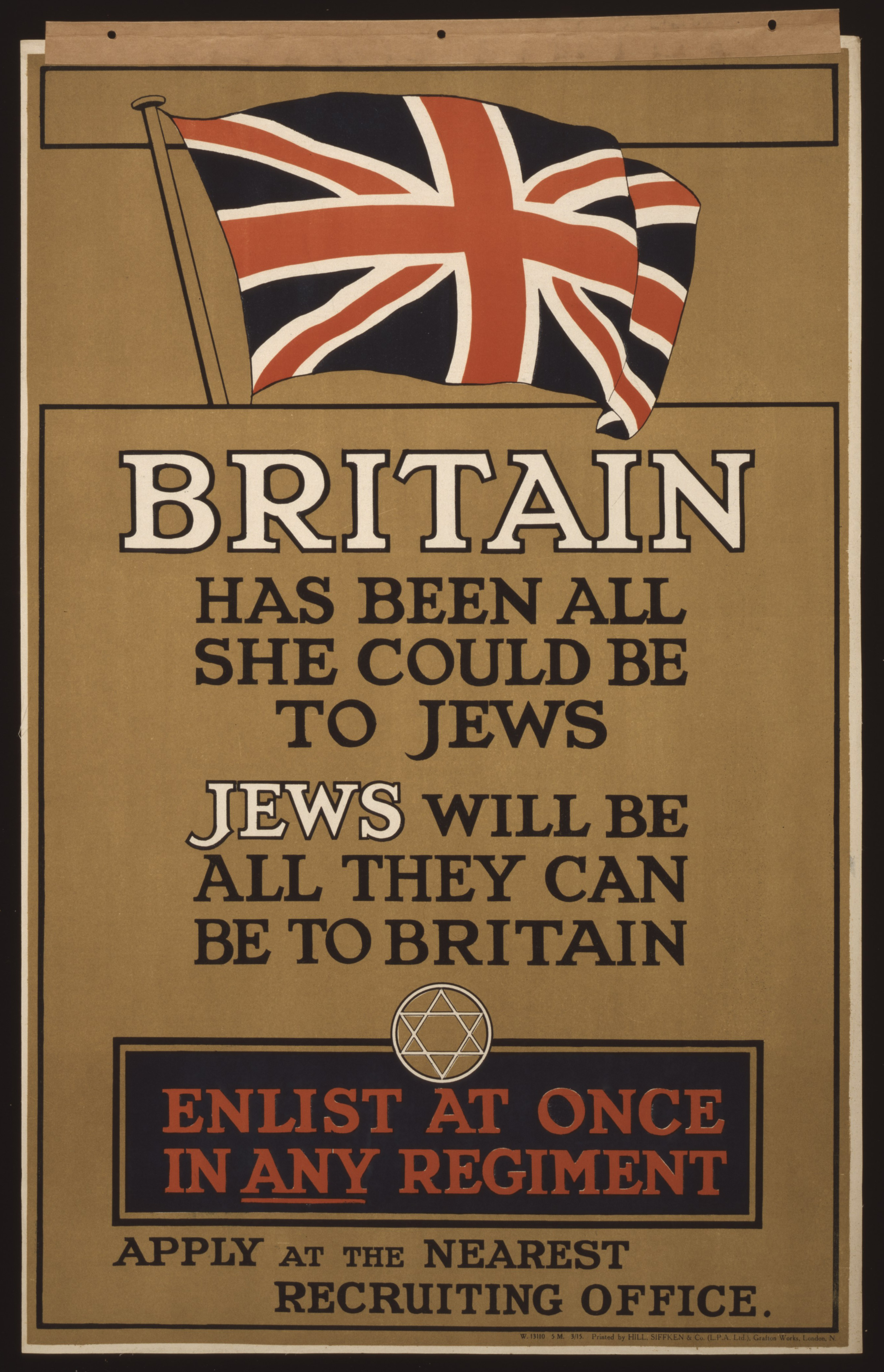
First World War recruitment poster, encouraging Jews to join the Armed Forces, saying that "Britain has been all she could be to Jews."

About 50,000 Jews served in the British Armed Forces during World War I, and around 10,000 died on the battlefield. Britain's first all-Jewish regiment, the Jewish Legion fought in Palestine. An important consequence of the war was the British conquest of the Palestinian Mandate, and the Balfour Declaration, marking an agreement between the British Government and the Zionist Federation of Great Britain and Ireland to strive to set up a homeland for Jews in Palestine.

==== Entrepreneurs ====
The Eastern European Jews brought with them a long history as skilled entrepreneurial middlemen. They were much more likely to become entrepreneurs than their gentile neighbours, with a heavy concentration in the garment industry as well as in retailing, entertainment and real estate. London provided excellent financing opportunities for entrepreneurs.

==== Sports ====
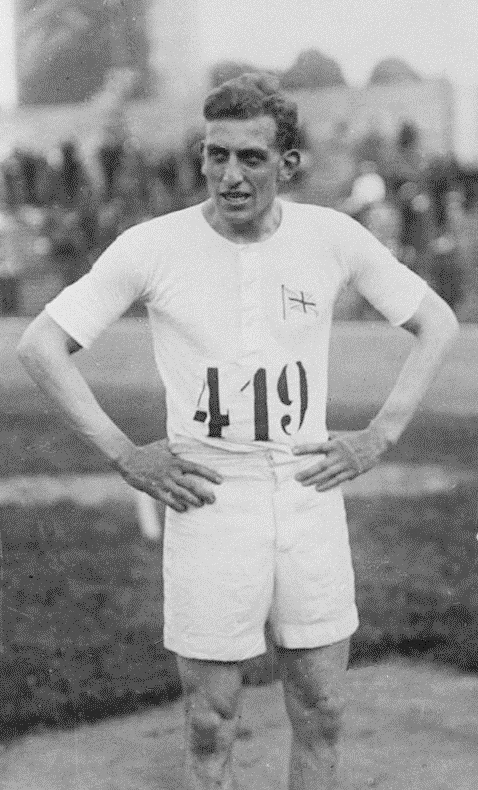
Harold Abrahams, gold medal winner at the 1924 Olympics.

Antisemitism was a serious handicap for Britain's Jews, especially the widespread stereotype to the effect that Jews were weak, effeminate and cowardly. The Zionist social critic Max Nordau promoted the term "muscle Jew" as a rebuttal to the stereotype. Challenging that stereotype was an important motivation for wartime service in the Boer war and in the First World War. It was also motivation for sports that appealed to the largely working-class Jewish youth element.

From the 1890s to the 1950s, British boxing was dominated by Jews whose families had migrated from Russia or the Austro-Hungarian Empire. Jews were heavily involved in boxing as professional and amateur fighters, managers, promoters, coaches and spectators—as well as gamblers and a certain criminal element that tried to fix fights. Their high visibility in a prestigious sport among the British working class helped reduce antisemitism and increased their acceptance in British society. The Jewish establishment worked hard to promote boxing among the youth, as a deliberate "Anglicisation" campaign designed to speed their adoption of British character traits and cultural values. The youth themselves eagerly participated, although the rising middle class status after the Second World War led to a sharp falloff of interest in younger generations.

The most celebrated of the Jewish athletes in Britain was Harold Abrahams (1899–1978)-– the man made famous by the film Chariots of Fire for winning the gold medal in the 100 metre sprint in the 1924 Paris Olympics. Abrahams was thoroughly Anglicised, and his cultural integration went hand-in-hand with his sporting achievements. He became a hero to the British Jewish community. However, Abrahams' quest to enter upper class British society increasingly dominated his career, as his Jewishness meant less and less to him and his associates.

=== Before and during World War II ===
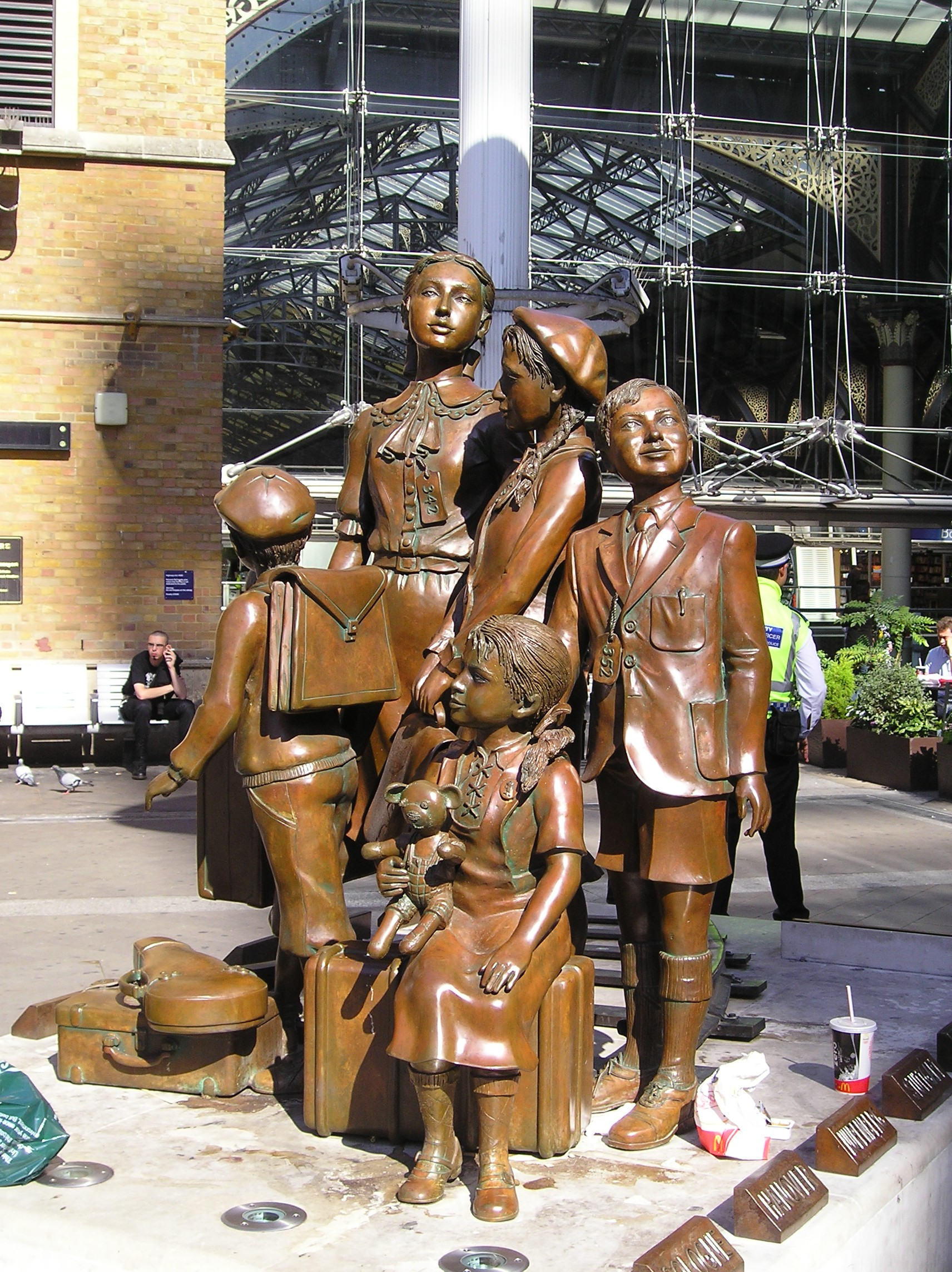
Kindertransport – The Arrival sculpture in central London marks the Kindertransport when the UK took in nearly 10,000 Jewish children prior to WWII. Dubbed the "British Schindler", Nicholas Winton was a notable member of the operation.

Though there was some growing antisemitism during the 1930s, it was counterbalanced by strong support for British Jews in their local communities leading to events such as the Battle of Cable Street where antisemitism and fascism was strongly resisted by socialists, trade unionists, Jews and their neighbours, who were successful in preventing a British Union of Fascists rally through a heavily Jewish area, despite police efforts to clear a path.

Consistent with its complex history, Britain was not particularly receptive to Jewish refugees fleeing the Nazi regime in Germany, and the other fascist states of Europe. Approximately 40,000 Jews from Austria and Germany were eventually allowed to settle in Britain before the War, in addition to 50,000 Jews from Italy, Poland, and elsewhere in Eastern Europe. Despite the increasingly dire warnings coming from Germany, Britain refused at the 1938 Evian Conference to allow further Jewish refugees into the country. The notable exception allowed by Parliament was the Kindertransport, an effort on the eve of war to transport Jewish children (their parents were not given visas) from Germany to Britain. Around 10,000 children were saved by the Kindertransport, out of a plan to rescue five times that number.

During the Nazi occupation of the Channel Islands three Jews from Guernsey—Marianne Grunfeld, Therese Steiner, and Auguste Spitz—were deported to Saint-Malo, Nazi-occupied France, and eventually killed at Auschwitz concentration camp. They would be the only Jews deported from British soil and killed in the Holocaust.

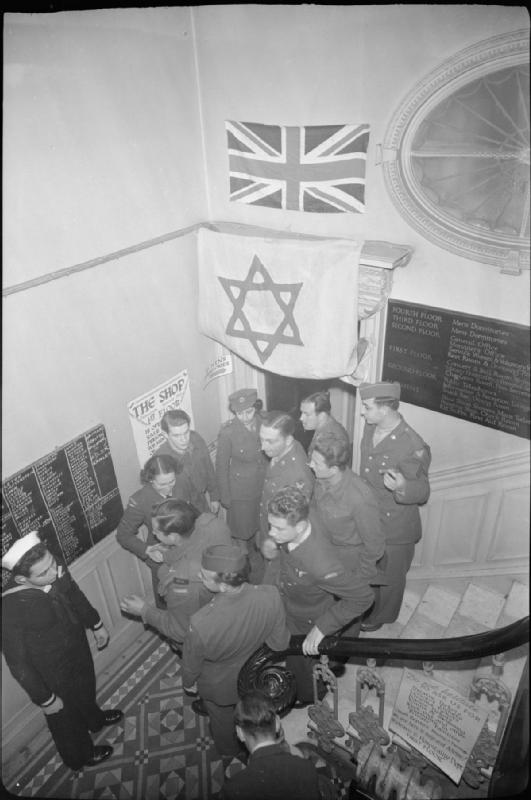
Allied forces celebrate Rosh Hashanah in London, 1943.

With the declaration of war, 74,000 German, Austrian and Italian citizens in the UK were interned as enemy aliens. After individual consideration by tribunal, the majority, largely made up of Jewish and other refugees, were released within six months.

Even more important to many Jews was the permission to settle in the British-controlled Mandatory Palestine. In order to try to maintain peace between the Jewish and Arab populations, especially after the 1936–1939 Arab revolt in Palestine, Britain strictly limited immigration. This limitation became nearly absolute after the White Paper of 1939 all but stopped legal immigration. During the War, Zionists organised an illegal immigration effort, conducted by "Hamossad Le'aliyah Bet" (the precursor of the Mossad) that rescued tens of thousands of European Jews from the Nazis by shipping them to Palestine in rickety boats. Many of these boats were intercepted and some sank with great loss of life. The efforts began in 1939, and the last immigrant boat to try to enter Palestine before the end of the war was MV Struma, torpedoed in the Black Sea by a Soviet Navy submarine in February 1942. The boat sank with the loss of nearly 800 lives.

Many Jews joined the British Armed Forces, including some 30,000 Jewish volunteers from Palestine alone, some of whom fought in the Jewish Brigade. Many formed the core of the Haganah after the war.

By July 1945, 228,000 troops of the Polish Armed Forces in the West, including Polish Jews, were serving under the high command of the British Army. Many of these men and women were originally from the Kresy region of eastern Poland and were deported by Soviet First Secretary Joseph Stalin to Siberia 1939–1941. They were then released from the Soviet Gulags to form the Anders Army and marched to Iran to form the II Corps (Poland). The Polish II Corps then advanced to the British Mandate of Palestine, where many Polish Jews, including Menachem Begin, deserted to work on forming the state of Israel, in a process known as the 'Anders Aliyah'. Other Polish Jews remained in the Polish Army to fight alongside the British in the North Africa and Italy campaigns. Around 10,000 Polish Jews fought under the Polish flag – and British High Command – at the Battle of Monte Cassino. All of them were eligible to settle in the UK after the Polish Resettlement Act 1947, Britain's first mass immigration law.

== 21st century ==
In May 2026, the Board of Deputies of British Jews launched the United Kingdom's first nationwide Jewish Culture Month, a month-long programme of more than 150 cultural events, with the goal of spreading positivity following years in which the Jewish community has been marked by hostility and anti-Semitism. Participating institutions included the Victoria and Albert Museum, the British Library, the National Portrait Gallery, and JW3.

== See also ==
- Antisemitism in the United Kingdom
- Chuts (19th Century Dutch Jewish immigrants)
- Council of Christians and Jews
- Early English Jewish literature
- Emancipation of the Jews in the United Kingdom
- History of the Jews in Ireland
- History of the Jews in Manchester
- History of the Jews in Northern Ireland
- History of the Jews in North East England
- History of the Jews in Scotland
- History of the Jews in Wales
- Jewish Museum (Camden)
- List of British Jewish nobility and gentry
- List of British Jews
- Polish British
- Rothschild banking family of England
- Starr (law)
- The War on Britain's Jews?, a 2007 documentary film

== Primary sources ==
- Richard of Devizes (1841), The chronicle of Richard of Devizes concerning the deeds of Richard the First, King of England, London: James Bohn, OCLC 4692428, OL 24872893M
