= Archa (document store) =

Type of mediaeval document repository

An archa or arca (plural archae) was a medieval document repository, such as a chest, associated with the financial records of Jews in England at the time.

According to Jewish Communities and Records UK, the archa was "an official chest, provided with three locks and seals, in which a counterpart of all deeds and contracts involving Jews was to be deposited in order to preserve the records." Similarly, The Jewish Encyclopedia of 1906 describes an archa as a "repository in which chirographs and other deeds were preserved."

Worcester and Winchester were two of the 26 Jewish centres of the time to have archae. The introduction of archae in Worcester was part of the reorganization of English Jewry ordered by King Richard I in light of the massacres of Jews that took place in 1189-1190 at, and shortly following, his coronation. These massacres resulted in a heavy loss of Crown revenue partly thanks to the destruction result of Jewish financial records by the murderous mob (in order to conceal evidence of debts due to the Jews). The archae were intended to safeguard the royal rights in case of future disorder. All Jewish possessions and credits were to be registered and several cities were designated as centres for all Jewish business operations and registration of Jewish financial transactions. In each centre, a bureau was set up consisting of two reputable Jews and two Christian clerks, under the supervision of a representative of the newly established central authority that became known as the Exchequer of the Jews.

== See also ==
- The dictionary definition of Arca at Wiktionary
