= Fine rolls =

Collection of English medieval financial records

The Fine rolls are a collection of financial records maintained by the English Chancery in the Middle Ages. Originating in the reign of King Henry III of England (1216–72), a fine represented a willingness to pay the crown a sum of money in exchange for a particular concession. In the medieval style of document storage of enrollment, the rolls which recorded these payments are called the Fine rolls.

== Treatment by historians ==
Traditionally, historians viewed the Fine rolls as presenting "fewer points of general interest" than the Close or Patent rolls, because they rarely – and only indirectly – touch upon the great political crises of the time. They have also been used as a means of assessing the crown's finances: the Fine rolls show, for example, how King John received approximately £20,000 per annum, whereas his son Henry III received less than half that amount. Recently, however, they have been used by historians to cast light on consequences of important events in the king's reign, rather than the events themselves. As David Carpenter put it, the rolls remain "central to the politics, government, and society", particularly because of the broad social spectrum they touched. For example, in the context of the 1216 reissue of Magna Carta by Henry's minority government, the concern of the council for the charter's consequences to dower payments owed the king are enrolled in the Fine rolls. Letters close which record fines are also enrolled; one such example is to the widow of Nigel de Mowbray, in which Henry III agreed to her right to stay unmarried or to "marry whom she wished". The rolls are also used, along with other records, to demonstrate the growth of English royal bureaucracy and administration. In 1913, T. F. Tout pointed out how a single published volume of Fine rolls covered the entire thirty-five year reign of Edward I, whereas for his son Edward II, two volumes were required, despite the latter's reign being of far shorter duration.

== See also ==
- Pipe rolls
