= Indenture =

Type of legal contract

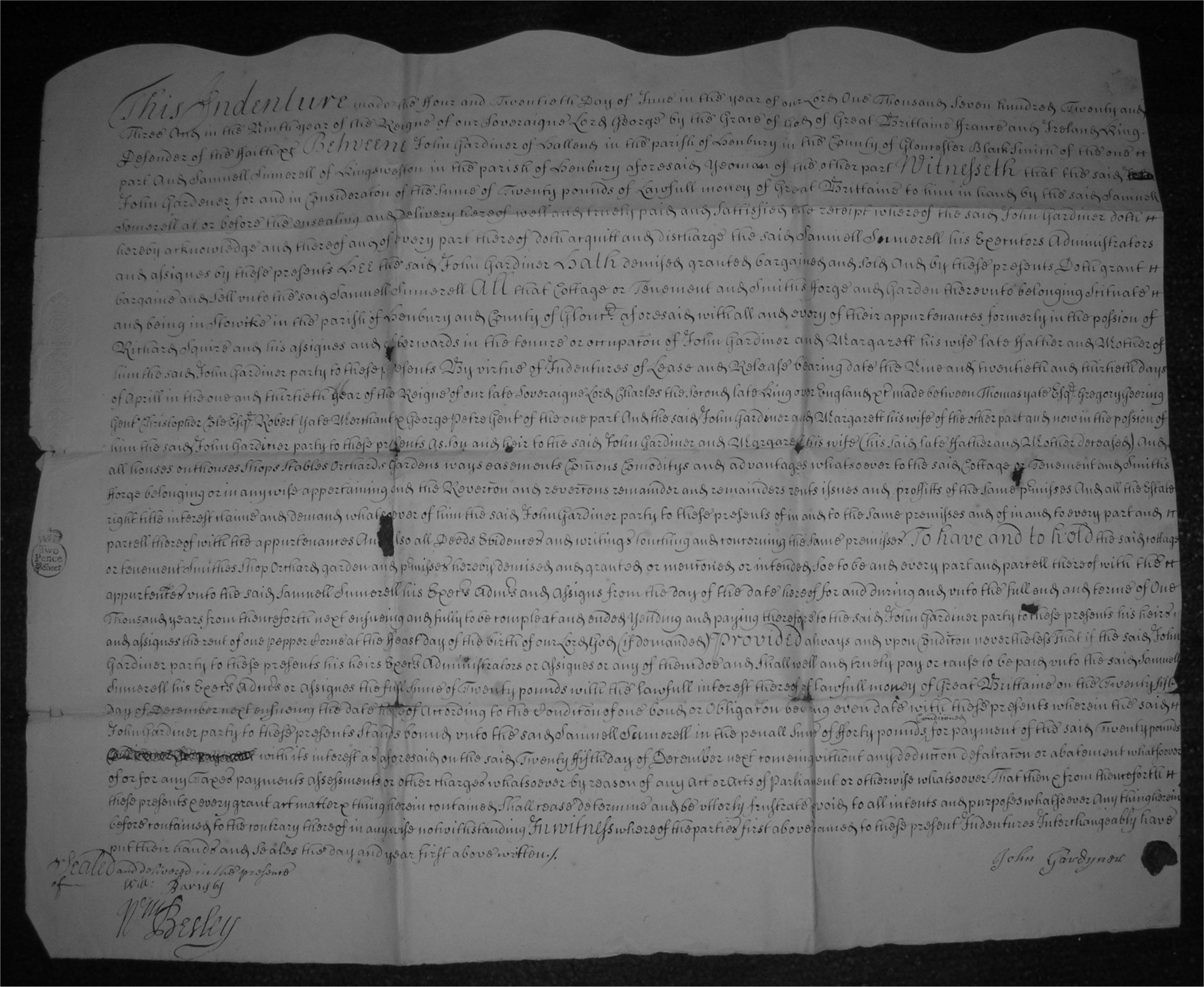
Half of an indenture document of 1723 showing the randomly cut edge at the top

An indenture is a legal contract that reflects an agreement between two parties. Although the term is most familiarly used to refer to a labor contract between an employer and a laborer with an indentured servant status, historically indentures were used for a variety of contracts, including transfers and rents of land and even peace agreements between rulers.

== Historical usage ==
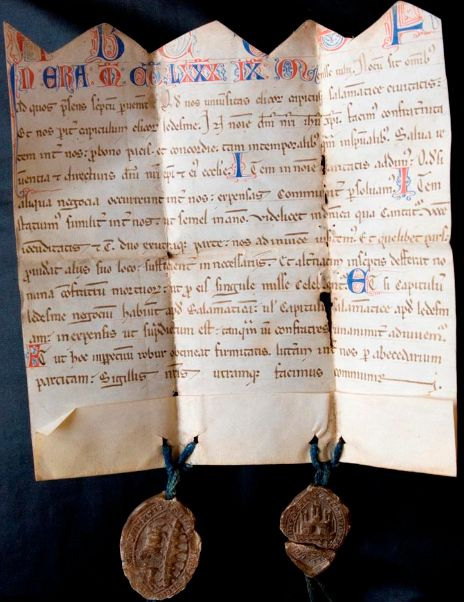
Charter of the Clerecía de Ledesma, 1252

Tripartite indenture between William Shakespeare and the estate of the vendor of New Place, confirming the transfer of ownership to Shakespeare. The third portion (the foot) was retained in the court.

An indenture is a legal contract between two parties, whether for indentured labour or a term of apprenticeship or for certain land transactions. The term comes from the medieval English "indenture of retainer"—a legal contract written in duplicate on the same sheet, with the copies separated by cutting along a jagged (toothed, hence the term "indenture") line so that the teeth of the two parts could later be refitted to confirm authenticity (chirograph). Each party to the deed would then retain a part. When the agreement was made before a court of law a tripartite indenture was made, with the third piece kept at the court. The term is used for any kind of deed executed by more than one party, in contrast to a deed poll which is made by one individual. In the case of bonds, the indenture shows the pledge, promises, representations and covenants of the issuing party.

Although other evidence indicates that the method has been in use from around the year 1000, the earliest surviving examples in England are from the thirteenth century. These are agreements for military service, proving that a paid contract army was then in existence. Exchequer records of Henry V's French campaign of 1415, which culminated in the Battle of Agincourt on 25 October 1415, including the indentures of all the captains of the army agreeing to provide specified numbers of men and at what cost, may still be read. An indenture was commonly used as a form of sealed contract or agreement for land and buildings. An example of such a use can be found in the National Archives, where an indenture, from about 1401, recording the transfer of the manor of Pinley, Warwickshire, is held.

In the early history of the United States, many European immigrants served a period of indentured labour in order to pay the cost of their transportation. This practice was common during the 17th and 18th centuries, where over half of immigrants worked off an average of three years' servitude.

== Modern usage ==
Bond indenture (also trust indenture or deed of trust) is a legal document issued to lenders and describes key terms such as the interest rate, maturity date, convertibility, pledge, promises, representations, covenants, and other terms of the bond offering. When the offering memorandum is prepared in advance of marketing a bond, the indenture will typically be summarised in the "description of notes" section.

In the United States, public debt offerings in excess of $10 million require the use of an indenture of trust under the Trust Indenture Act of 1939. The rationale for this is that it is necessary to establish a collective action mechanism under which creditors can collect in a fair, orderly manner if default takes place (like that which occurs during bankruptcy). No trust relationship exists between the bondholder and the issuing corporation. These two are in a regular contractual, arm's length, non-fiduciary, non-equity relationship. Rather, the trustee in a "trust indenture" is a third party, usually a specialist company, who is appointed by the issuer to handle and safeguard the interests of the numerous public bondholders, in events ranging from the usual distribution of coupons and principal payments to dealing with the issuer's default, if any occurs.

== See also ==
- Corporate finance
- Debt security
- Debt bondage
- Debenture
- Indentured servant
- Indian indenture system
- Irish slaves myth
- Prospectus
- Securities law
- Slavery
- Blackbirding
