= Fine of lands =

Type of property conveyance in England

Final concord (two parts) between William Shakespeare and Hercules Underhill, confirming Shakespeare's title to New Place, Stratford-upon-Avon, Michaelmas 1602

A fine of lands, also called a final concord, or simply a fine, was a species of property conveyance which existed in England (and later in Wales) from at least the 12th century until its abolition by the Fines and Recoveries Act 1833.

== Form ==
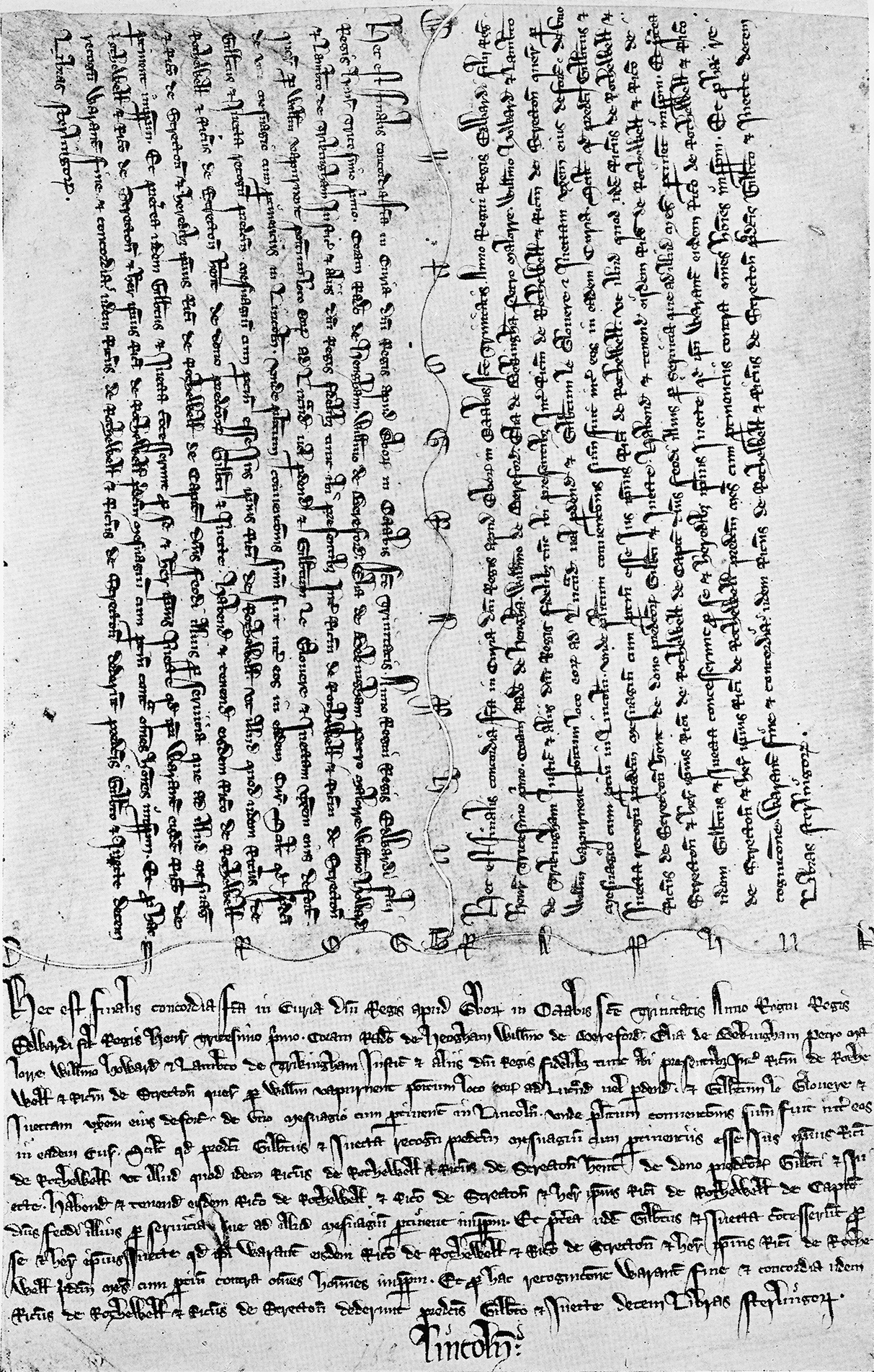
A fine of 1303, including both parties' chirographs and the foot of the fine.

The conveyance took the form of the record of a fictitious lawsuit, compromised or terminated by the acknowledgment of the existing owner (known as the deforciant, impedient or tenant, depending on the original writ used to levy the fine) that the land in question was the rightful property of the claimant (the plaintiff, querent or demandant). In reality, the deforciant had already agreed to sell the land, and the plaintiff to buy it. The suit was a collusive action to ensure the "levying of a fine" between the two parties. Typically the plaintiff(s) would bring a writ of covenant alleging:

1. He/she/they and the deforciant had entered into a covenant to transfer some real property
2. The deforciant had not held up his end of the bargain.

In all actions like this, before the court could render judgment, and typically on the same day the writ was returned, the parties would seek leave of the court to compromise, and then do so on terms where the deforciant admitted the new ownership. A fine was said to be "levied".

The court provided each party with a copy chirograph of the agreement, which became the purchaser's deed of title to the land. From about 1195, it became standard practice for a third copy, known as a "foot of fine", to be retained in the court records. The standard opening formula of the document ran "Hec est finalis concordia ..." in Latin (before 1733); then "This is the final agreement ..." (from 1733 onwards).

== Purpose ==
In the Middle Ages, the advantage of obtaining title to property through a fine (as opposed to, for example, a simple feoffment or deed of gift) was that it provided the transaction with the additional legal authority of a royal or court judgment and ensured that a record of the conveyance would be preserved among the court archives.

In the post-medieval period, the fine continued to serve a useful and necessary purpose, as it allowed an entail to be barred (ended), or allowed a widow to bar (disclaim) her right to dower. In other circumstances, a common recovery was used for the same purpose. The true intention of the fine was often explained in a separate document, known as a deed to lead (or to declare) the uses of a fine if it was executed beforehand (or afterwards) respectively.
