= Philip Ferdinand =

Polish-born English academic (1555–1598)

Philip Ferdinand (1555, Poland - 1598, Leiden) was an English Hebraist.

Born in Poland to Polish Jewish parents, he converted first to Roman Catholicism and then to Protestantism. He was a poor student at Oxford University, where he taught Hebrew. He matriculated at Cambridge University in 1596. He became professor of Hebrew at Leiden, where he died. He translated Rabbinic works into Latin.
