= Gregory of Huntingdon =

Gregory of Huntingdon (fl. 1290) was a monk of Ramsey Abbey, of which abbey he is said to have been prior for thirty-eight years. He is described as a man of much learning, acquainted with Latin, Greek, and Hebrew. On the expulsion of the Jews from England in 1290 he purchased from them all the Hebrew books which he could procure, and presented them to his abbey. In the catalogue of books in the library of Ramsey— printed in 'Chr. Ramsey,' Rolls Ser., p. 365— a list of books of Gregory the prior is given, which includes several in Hebrew and Greek.

From the books thus collected Laurence Holbeach is said to have compiled a Hebrew dictionary about 1410. According to Bale and Pits, Gregory wrote:

- Ars intelligendi Græca.
- Grammaticæ summa.
- Explanationes Græcorum nominum.
- Attentarium.
- Epistolæ curiales.
- Expositio Donati.
- Notulæ in Priscianum,
- Imago mundi. This work is commonly ascribed to Henry of Huntingdon, and sometimes to Bede
- Rudimenta grammaticæ.
- Sententiæ per versus.
- Regulæ versificandi.
