= Starr (law) =

Historical term in England

Starr, or starra, was a term used in pre-fourteenth century England for the contract or obligation of a Jew. It derives from the Hebrew שטר (shtar, "document"). Also, it derives from Latin "stare" i.e. "to stand" whereby "standing" as a principle of law meant than one sued over a perceived obligation.

By an ordinance of Richard I, no English starr or "standing to sue" was valid unless deposited in one of certain repositories, the best-known of which was the King's exchequer at Westminster. It was once speculated that the room where these were kept became known as the "starr-chamber" as a result, although this theory is dismissed by the Oxford English Dictionary.

== See also ==
- Exchequer of the Jews
- Star Chamber
