= Paul Brand (historian) =

British legal historian

Paul Anthony Brand, FBA, FRHistS (born 25 December 1946) is a British legal historian. He was Professor of Legal History at the University of Oxford from 2010 to 2014 and a senior research fellow at All Souls College, Oxford, from 1999 to 2014.

== Career ==
Born on 25 December 1946, Brand attended Hampton Grammar School from 1957 to 1964, when he went up to Magdalen College, Oxford (graduating with a Bachelor of Arts degree in 1967). While completing his doctorate at Magdalen (awarded in 1974 for his thesis "The contribution of the period of baronial reform (1258–1267) to the development of the common law in England"), Brand worked as an assistant keeper at the Public Record Office from 1970 to 1976, when he took up a lectureship at University College Dublin. He left UCD in 1983 and carried out research for ten years before joining the Institute of Historical Research (IHR) as a research fellow in 1993. In 1997, he was elected to a two-year fellowship at All Souls College, Oxford, and in 1999 became a senior research fellow there (leaving his post at the IHR). He was also Professor of English Legal History at the University of Oxford from 2010 to 2014, when he retired (remaining at All Souls as an emeritus fellow).

== Honours and awards ==
In 1998, Brand was elected a Fellow of the British Academy, the United Kingdom's national academy for the humanities and social sciences. He is also a Fellow of the Royal Historical Society and since 2014, he has also been an honorary bencher at the Middle Temple. In 2018 he was the recipient of the Sarton Medal of the University of Ghent.

== Selected publications ==
- (Co-authored with Joshua Getzler) Judges and Judging in the History of the Common Law and Civil Law: From Antiquity to Modern Times (Cambridge: Cambridge University Press, 2012).
- (Co-edited) The Parliament Rolls of Medieval England, vols. I–II (Woodbridge: Boydell and Brewer, 2005).
- (Edited) Plea Rolls of the Exchequer of the Jews, vol. VI (London: Jewish Historical Society of England, 2005).
- Kings, Barons and Justices: The Making and Enforcement of Legislation in Thirteenth-Century England, Cambridge Studies in Medieval Life and Thought, 4th series, no. 56 (Cambridge: Cambridge University Press, 2003).
- (Edited) The Earliest English Law Reports, vols. I–IV (Selden Society, vols. 111, 112, 122, 123; 1995–6, 2005–7).
- The Making of the Common Law (London: Rio Grande, 1992).
- The Origins of the English Legal Profession (Oxford: Blackwell, 1992).
