= Chirograph =

Medieval document which is split down the middle

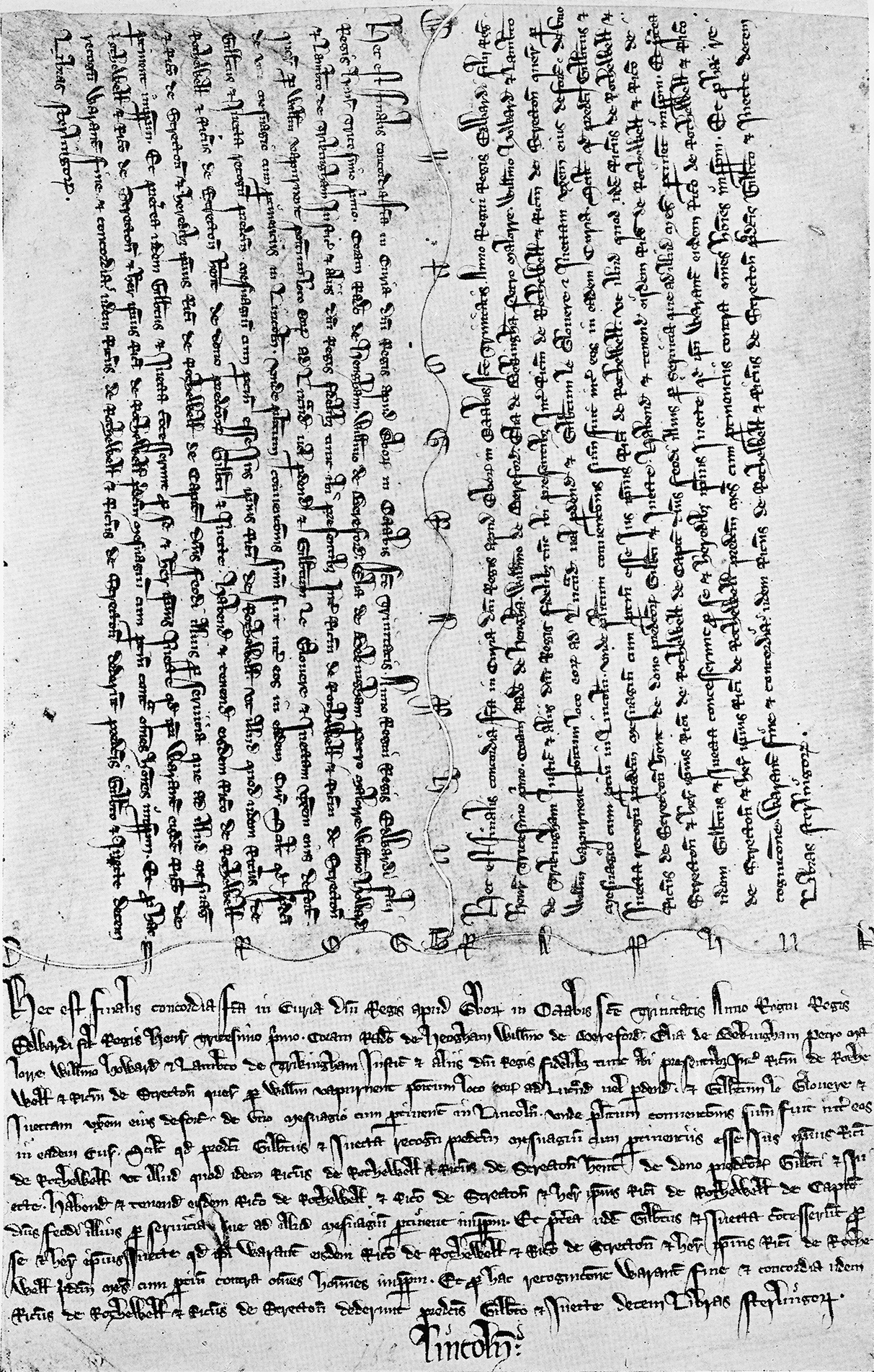
An English property conveyance (a final concord) in triplicate chirograph form, dating from 1303. The word cirographum can be seen written twice, vertically and horizontally, along both cuts. The two copies of the agreement at the top were intended for retention by the two parties to the transaction; while the third copy (the "foot of fine") was for retention by the court that oversaw the process.

A chirograph is a medieval document, which has been written in duplicate, triplicate or very occasionally quadruplicate (four copies) on a single piece of parchment, with the Latin word chirographum (occasionally replaced by some other term) written across the middle, and then cut through to separate the parts. The term also refers to a papal decree whose circulation is limited to the Roman curia.

== Etymology ==
The Latin word chirographum, often spelled cirographum or cyrographum in the medieval period, is derived from the Greek χειρόγραφον, and simply means "handwritten".

== Description ==
The intention of the chirograph was to produce two (or more) identical written copies of a legal agreement, that could be retained by each party to the transaction, and if necessary verified at a later date through comparison with one another. Whereas Charters were typically used for titles of property and did not give each party a copy, chirographs could be used for almost any legal agreement – for example, matters of state, land transfers, repayments of loans, marriage settlements, etc. The cut itself would generally be made with a wavy or serrated edge, running through the word chirographum, to allow the copies to be matched physically as a safeguard against forgery. The earliest surviving portion of a chirograph in England dates from the middle of the ninth century.

The practice of separating the copies with an irregular cut also gave rise to the description of the documents as "indentures", since the edges would be said to be "indented". In the post-medieval period, as legal documents grew in length and complexity, it became impractical to fit two duplicate texts onto a single sheet of parchment. It therefore became more usual to make the two copies on two or more separate sheets, the top edges of which were still cut with a symbolic or matching wavy line.

== Ecclesiastical use ==
A more restricted use of the term is to describe a papal decree whose circulation—unlike an encyclical—is limited to the Roman curia.

Pope Francis on 26 June 2013 used a chirograph to set up a Commission to investigate the decisions and underlying investments of the Institute for the Works of Religion (the so-called "Vatican Bank"). The document was "an instrument under canon law giving the commission legal force, and expressing its broad aim to help ensure that 'the principles of the Gospel also permeate activities of an economic and financial nature.'"

== See also ==
- Indenture, a similar document recording an important agreement, formerly including slavery and apprenticeships, latterly in relation to certain major land dealings or certain debts of money, retained in a few and dwindling number of jurisdictions
- Fine of lands, or final concord, a type of property conveyance in chirograph form common in medieval and post-medieval England
- Tally stick, or split tally, a comparable system of creating matching copies of simple accounting records on a split stick
