= Fine on alienation =

A fine on alienation (see Alienation (property law)), in feudal law, was a sum of money paid to the lord by a tenant when he had occasion to make over his land to another. It is similar in nature to a relief, a payment made by an heir to the lord to receive his inheritance.
