= Early English Jewish literature =

11th–13th-century Hebrew-language writing in England

Jewish writers in England during the pre-expulsion period of the eleventh through the thirteenth centuries produced different kinds of writing in Hebrew. Many were Tosafists; others wrote legal material, and some wrote liturgical poetry and literary texts.

== Jewish writers ==
According to Joseph Jacobs, Jewish literary and scholarly culture received its prime impetus during the time of Angevin England from France. Jacobs sees Simeon Chasid of Treves as the first such writer; he lived in England between 1106 and 1146. Subsequent important Jewish English writers came from Orléans, including Jacob of Orléans, who was murdered during the anti-Jewish violence during the coronation of Richard I in 1189, and possibly Abraham ben Joseph of Orleans.

=== 12th century ===
- Jacob of Orléans (died 1189) was an often-quoted Tosafist.
- Abraham ben Joseph (born c. 1140) was a Tosafist, and may have been the Chief Rabbi of London in 1186.
- Judah ben Isaac Messer Leon (1166–1224), a Tosafist, married a daughter an Abraham ben Joseph.
- Yom Tov of Joigny (died 1190), French-born rabbi, Tosafist, and liturgical poet who lived in York, and died in the 1190 pogrom at York Castle.
- Moses ben Isaac ben ha-Nessiah, grammarian and lexicographer.
- Berechiah ha-Nakdan, exegete, grammarian, and translator who likely lived in England in the late 12th century.

=== 13th century ===
- Moses of London (died 1268), grammarian, halakhist and Jewish scholar in London.
- Berechiah de Nicole (died after 1270), Tosafist.
- Aaron of Canterbury, rabbi and halakhic exegete
- Elias of London, legal expert

== Effects of restrictions ==
The increasing degradation of the political status of the Jews in the thirteenth century is paralleled by the scarcity of their literary output compared with that of the twelfth. In the earlier century, for example, there were eminent authorities such as Abraham ibn Ezra, Judah Sir Leon of Paris, Yom Tov of Joigny, and Jacob of Orléans, in addition to a school of grammarians which appears to have existed, including Moses ben Yom-Ṭob and Moses ben Isaac. In England Berechiah ha-Nakdan produced his Fox Fables—one of the most remarkable literary productions of the Middle Ages.

== Some early works of the 13th century ==
In the thirteenth century, however, only a few authorities, like Moses of London, Berechiah de Nicole, Aaron of Canterbury, and Elias of London, are known, together with Jacob ben Judah of London, author of a work on the ritual, Etz Chaim, and Meïr of Norwich, a liturgical poet. Throughout they were a branch of the French Jewry, speaking French and writing French glosses, and almost up to the eve of the expulsion they wrote French in ordinary correspondence.

== See also ==
- History of the Jews in England
- History of the Jews in Scotland
