= Literature of England =

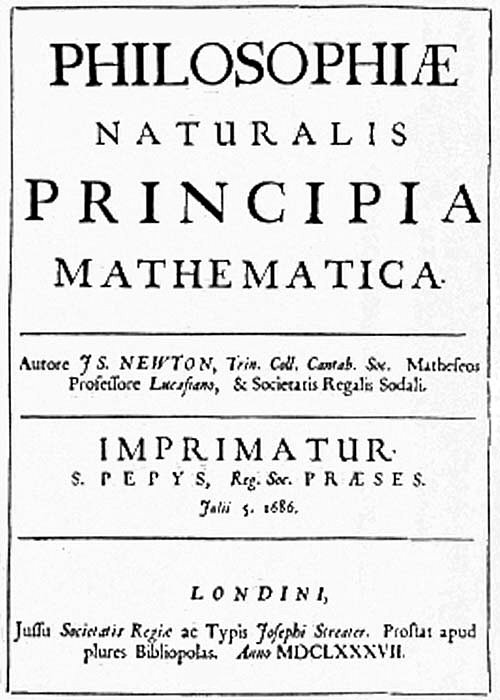
Newton's Principia, 1687

The literature of England is literature written in what is now England, or by English writers. It consists mainly of English literature - i.e. literature written in the English language - but there are important examples of literature from England written in other languages.

== Anglo-Latin literature ==
This consists of a number of principally ecclesiastical and historical works, spanning a period of over a thousand years. Bede's Historia ecclesiastica gentis Anglorum is a notable example. Several more recent examples exist of English works written originally in Latin: Utopia (1516) by Sir Thomas More, for example, and New Atlantis, a utopian narrative by Sir Francis Bacon, published in Latin (as Nova Atlantis) in 1624 and in English in 1627. Sir Isaac Newton also produced the Principia, among other works, in Latin.

== Anglo-Norman literature ==
This consists of medieval literature in the Anglo-Norman tongue, and also in French. The French epic appeared in England at an early date. It is believed that the Chanson de Roland was sung at the Battle of Hastings, and some Anglo-Norman manuscripts of Chansons de geste have survived to this day. The Pèlerinage de Charlemagne (Eduard Koschwitz, Altfranzösische Bibliothek, 1883) was preserved only in an Anglo-Norman manuscript of the British Museum (now lost), if the author was a Parisian. The oldest surviving manuscript of the Chanson de Roland is a manuscript written in England. The manuscript of La Chançun de Willame was published in facsimile in Chiswick in June 1903 (cf. Paul Meyer, Romania, xxxii. 597–618).

== Hebrew ==
Anglo-Jewish literature was written in the Middle Ages, and ended when the Edict of Expulsion took effect. It resumed again, as part of an entirely new tradition, with the return of Judaism to England. In the thirteenth century, however, only a few authorities - like Moses of London, Berechiah de Nicole, Aaron of Canterbury and Elias of London - are known, together with Jacob ben Judah of London, author of a work on the ritual, Etz Chaim, and Meïr of Norwich, a liturgical poet.
