= Wolves in folklore, religion and mythology =

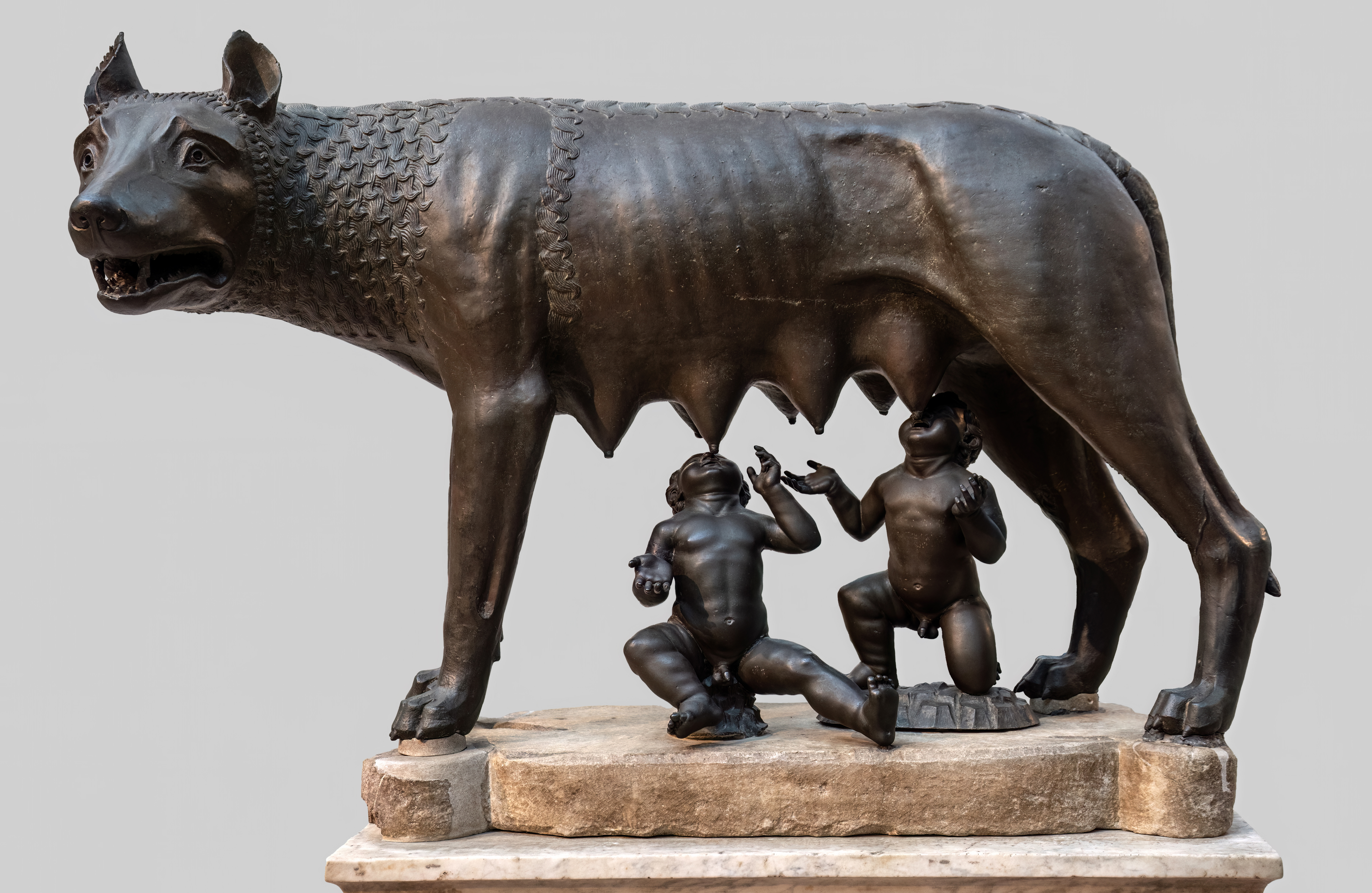
The Capitoline Wolf with Romulus and Remus

The wolf is a common motif in the foundational mythologies and cosmologies of peoples throughout Eurasia and North America (corresponding to the historical extent of the habitat of the gray wolf), and also plays a role in ancient European cultures. The modern trope of the Big Bad Wolf arises from European folklore. The wolf holds great importance in the cultures and religions of many nomadic peoples, such as those of the Eurasian steppe and North American Plains.

Wolves have sometimes been associated with witchcraft in both northern European and some Native American cultures: in Norse folklore, the völva Hyndla and the gýgr Hyrrokin are both portrayed as using wolves as mounts, while in Navajo culture, wolves have sometimes been interpreted as witches in wolf's clothing. Traditional Tsilhqot'in beliefs have warned that contact with wolves could in some cases possibly cause mental illness and death.

== Akkadian ==
One of the earliest written references to black wolves occurs in the Babylonian epic Gilgamesh, in which the titular character rejects the sexual advances of the goddess Ishtar, reminding her that she had transformed a previous lover, a shepherd, into a wolf, thus turning him into the very animal that his flocks must be protected against.

== Caucasian ==
The names of the nation of Georgia derives from Old Persian designation of the Georgians vrkān (𐎺𐎼𐎣𐎠𐎴) meaning "the land of the wolves", that would eventually transform into gorğān, the term that found its way into most European languages as "Georgia".

The wolf is a national symbol of Chechnya. According to folklore, the Chechens are "born of a she-wolf", as included in the central line in the national myth, as well as the opening line of the National Anthem of the Chechen Republic of Ichkeria. The "lone wolf" symbolizes strength, independence and freedom. A proverb about the teips (clans) is "equal and free like wolves".

== Indo-European ==
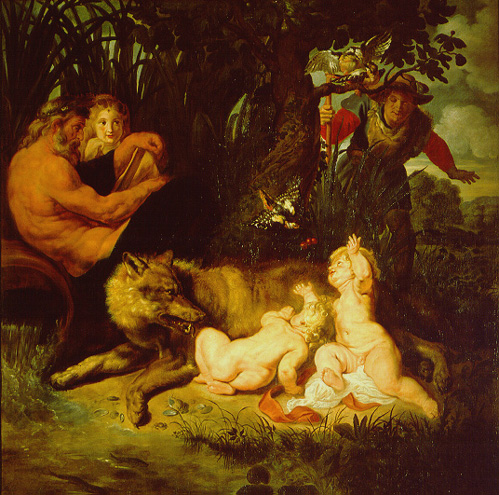
Romulus and Remus nursed by the She-wolf (c. 1616), Peter Paul Rubens

In Proto-Indo-European mythology, the wolf was presumably associated with the warrior class (kóryos), who would "transform into wolves" (or dogs) upon their initiation. This is reflected in Iron Age Europe in the Tierkrieger depictions from the Germanic sphere, among others. The standard comparative overview of this aspect of Indo-European mythology is McCone (1987)

=== Baltic ===
According to legend, the establishment of the Lithuanian capital Vilnius began when the grand duke Gediminas dreamt of an iron wolf howling near the hill. Lithuanian goddess Medeina was described as a single, unwilling to get married, though voluptuous and beautiful huntress. She was depicted as a she-wolf with an escort of wolves.

=== Dacian ===
In his book From Zalmoxis to Genghis Khan, Mircea Eliade attempted to give a mythological foundation to an alleged special relation between Dacians and the wolves:

- Dacians might have called themselves "wolves" or "ones the same with wolves", suggesting religious significance.
- Dacians draw their name from a god or a legendary ancestor who appeared as a wolf.
- Dacians had taken their name from a group of fugitive immigrants arrived from other regions or from their own young outlaws, who acted similarly to the wolves circling villages and living from looting. As was the case in other societies, those young members of the community went through an initiation, perhaps up to a year, during which they lived as a "wolf". Comparatively, Hittite laws referred to fugitive outlaws as "wolves".
- The existence of a ritual that provides one with the ability to turn into a wolf. Such a transformation may be related either to lycanthropy itself, a widespread phenomenon, but attested especially in the Balkans-Carpathian region, or a ritual imitation of the behavior and appearance of the wolf. Such a ritual was presumably a military initiation, potentially reserved to a secret brotherhood of warriors (or Männerbünde). To become formidable warriors they would assimilate behavior of the wolf, wearing wolf skins during the ritual. Traces related to wolves as a cult or as totems were found in this area since the Neolithic period, including the Vinča culture artifacts: wolf statues and fairly rudimentary figurines representing dancers with a wolf mask. The items could indicate warrior initiation rites, or ceremonies in which young people put on their seasonal wolf masks. The element of unity of beliefs about werewolves and lycanthropy exists in the magical-religious experience of mystical solidarity with the wolf by whatever means used to obtain it. But all have one original myth, a primary event.

=== Germanic ===
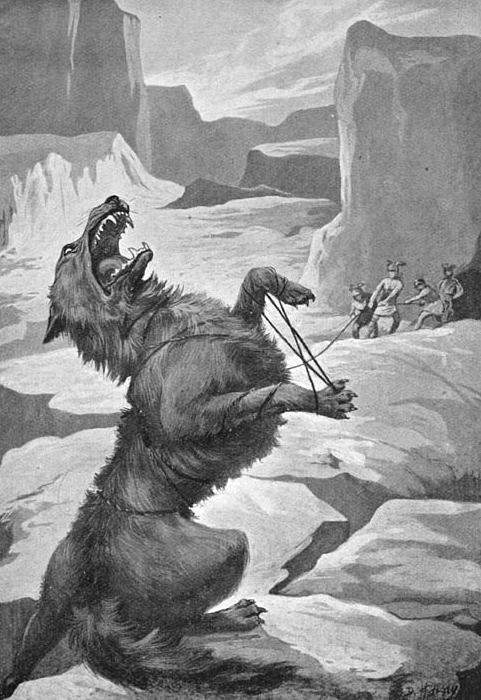
Fenrir, bound by the gods

Norse mythology prominently includes three malevolent wolves, in particular: the giant Fenrisulfr or Fenrir, eldest child of Loki and Angrboda who was feared and hated by the Æsir, and Fenrisulfr's children, Sköll and Hati. Fenrir is bound by the gods, but is ultimately destined to grow too large for his bonds and devour Odin during the course of Ragnarök. At that time, he will have grown so large that his upper jaw touches the sky while his lower touches the earth when he gapes. He will be slain by Odin's son, Viðarr, who will either stab him in the heart or rip his jaws asunder, according to different accounts. Fenrir's two offspring will, according to legend, devour the sun and moon at Ragnarök. On the other hand, however, the wolves Geri and Freki were the Norse god Odin's faithful pets who were reputed to be "of good omen."

Wolves were seen as both being negative and positive to the Norse people. On one hand, they represent the untameable forces of nature (e.g. Fenrir, Skoll, and Hati), while on the other hand, they can also represent bravery, loyalty, protection, and wisdom.

In the Hervarar saga, king Heidrek is asked by Gestumblindi (Odin), "What is that lamp which lights up men, but flame engulfs it, and wargs grasp after it always." Heidrek knows the answer is the Sun, explaining: "She lights up every land and shines over all men, and Skoll and Hatti are called wargs. Those are wolves, one going before the sun, the other after the moon."

But wolves also served as mounts for more or less dangerous humanoid creatures. For instance, Gunnr's horse was a kenning for "wolf" on the Rök runestone; in the Lay of Hyndla, the völva Hyndla rides a wolf; and to Baldr's funeral, the gýgr Hyrrokin arrived on a wolf.

Wolf or Wulf is used as a surname, given name, and a name among Germanic-speaking peoples. "Wolf" is also a component in other Germanic names:

- Wolfgang (wolf + gang ("path, journey"))
- Adolf, derived from the Old High German Athalwolf, a composition of athal, or adal, meaning noble, and wolf; its Anglo-Saxon cognate is Æthelwulf.
- Rudolf, deriving from two stems: Rod or Hrōð, meaning "fame", and olf meaning "wolf" (see also Hroðulf).

=== Greek ===
The Ancient Greeks associated wolves with the sun god Apollo.

Mount Lykaion (Λύκαιον ὄρος) is a mountain in Arcadia where an altar of Zeus was located. Zeus Lykaios was said to have been born and brought up on it, and was the home of Pelasgus and his son Lycaon, who is said to have founded the ritual of Zeus practiced on its summit. This seems to have involved a human sacrifice, and a feast in which the man who received the portion of a human victim was changed to a wolf, as Lycaon had been after sacrificing a child. The sanctuary of Zeus played host to athletic games held every four years, the Lykaia.

According to Suda the bodyguards of Peisistratos were called wolf-feet (Λυκόποδες), because they always had their feet covered with wolf-skins, to prevent frostbite; alternatively because they had a wolf symbol on their shields.

=== Indian ===
In the Rig Veda, Ṛjrāśva is blinded by his father as punishment for having given 101 of his family's sheep to a she-wolf, who in turn prays to the Ashvins to restore his sight. Wolves are occasionally mentioned in Hindu mythology. In the Harivamsa, Krishna, to convince the people of Vraja to migrate to Vṛndāvana, creates hundreds of wolves from his hairs, which frighten the inhabitants of Vraja into making the journey. Bhima, the voracious son of the god Vayu, is described as Vṛkodara, meaning "wolf-stomached".

=== Iranic ===
According to Zoroastrian legends, Zoroaster as a child was carried by the devs (the gods) to the lair of the she-wolf, in expectation that the savage beast would kill it; but she accepted it among her own cubs, and Vahman brought an ewe (female sheep) to the den which suckled it. (It was impossible in the Zoroastrian legend for the wolf herself to give milk to the infant, since wolves are regarded as daevic creatures.) According to the Avesta, the sacred text of the Zoroastrians, wolves are a creation from the 'darkness' of the evil spirit Ahriman, and are ranked among the most cruel of animals. and belong to the daevas. The Bundahishn, which is a Middle Persian text on the Zoroastrian creation myth, has a chapter dedicated to the 'nature of wolves' as seen in Zoroastrian mythology and belief.

Wusuns, an Indo-European semi-nomadic steppe people of Iranian origin, had a legend that after their king Nandoumi was killed by Yuezhi, another Indo-European people, Nandoumi's infant son Liejiaomi was left in the wild and He was miraculously saved from hunger being suckled by a she-wolf, and fed meat by ravens.

=== Roman ===
In Roman mythology wolves are mainly associated to Mars, god of war and agriculture. The Capitoline Wolf nurses Romulus and Remus, sons of Mars and future founders of Rome. The twin babies were ordered to be killed by their great uncle Amulius. The servant ordered to kill them, however, relented and placed the two on the banks of the Tiber river. The river, which was in flood, rose and gently carried the cradle and the twins downstream, where under the protection of the river deity Tiberinus, they would be adopted by a she-wolf known as Lupa in Latin, an animal sacred to Mars. As a consequence, the Italian wolf is the national animal of the modern Italian Republic.

In Antiquity, the she-wolf was identified as a symbol of Rome by both the Romans themselves and nations under the Roman rule. The Lupa Romana was an iconic scene that represented in the first place the idea of romanitas, being Roman. When it was used in the Roman Provinces, it can be seen as an expression of loyalty to Rome and the emperor.

The treatment given to wolves differed from the treatment meted out to other large predators. The Romans generally seem to have refrained from intentionally harming wolves. For instance, they were not hunted for pleasure (but only in order to protect herds that were out at pasture), and not displayed in the venationes, either. The special status of the wolf was not based on national ideology, but rather was connected to the religious importance of the wolf to the Romans.

The comedian Plautus used the image of wolves to ponder the cruelty of man as a wolf unto man.

"Lupus" (Wolf) was used as a Latin first name and as a Roman cognomen.

=== Slavic ===
The Slavic languages share a term for "werewolf" derived from the Common Slavic vuko-dlak, meaning "wolf-fur".

The wolf as a mythological creature plays an important role in Balkan and Serbian mythology and cults. In the Slavic and old Serbian religion and mythology, the wolf was used as a totem. In Serbian epic poetry, the wolf is a symbol of fearlessness. Vuk Karadžić, the 19th-century Serbian philologist and ethnographer, explained the traditional, apotropaic use of his own name Vuk ("wolf"): A woman who had lost several babies in succession would name her newborn son Vuk, as it was believed that the witches, who "ate" babies, were afraid to attack wolves.

== Japanese ==
Raijū ("thunder beast") is a god from the Shinto religion. It is attributed with causing thunder, along with Raijin, who causes lightning. While Raijū is generally calm and harmless, during thunderstorms it becomes agitated, and leaps about in trees, fields, and even buildings.

In another Japanese myth, grain farmers once worshiped wolves at shrines and left food offerings near their dens, beseeching them to protect their crops from wild boars and deer. Talismans and charms adorned with images of wolves were thought to protect against fire, disease, calamities, and brought fertility to agrarian communities, as well as to couples hoping to have children. The Ainu people believed that they were born from the union of a wolf-like creature and a goddess.

== Turkic ==
In the mythology of the Turkic peoples, the wolf is a revered animal. In the Turkic mythology, wolves were believed to be the ancestors of their people. The legend of Ashina is an old Turkic myth that tells of how the Turkic people were created. In Northern China a small Turkic village was raided by Chinese soldiers, but one small baby was left behind. An old she-wolf with a sky-blue mane named Ashina found the baby and nursed him, then the she-wolf gave birth to half-wolf, half-human cubs, from whom the Turkic people were born. Also in Turkic mythology it is believed that a gray wolf showed the Turks the way out of their legendary homeland Ergenekon, which allowed them to spread and conquer their neighbours.

== Mongolian ==
In the Secret History of the Mongols, the Mongol peoples are said to have descended from the mating of a doe (gua maral) and a wolf (boerte chino). In modern Mongolia, the wolf is still seen as a good luck symbol, especially for males. In Mongolian folk medicine, eating the intestines of a wolf is said to alleviate chronic indigestion, while sprinkling food with powdered wolf rectum is said to cure hemorrhoids. Mongol mythology explains the wolf's occasional habit of surplus killing by pointing to their traditional creation story. It states that when God explained to the wolf what it should and should not eat, he told it that it may eat one sheep out of 1,000. The wolf however misunderstood and thought God said kill 1,000 sheep and eat one.

== Arctic and North America ==
In most Native American cultures, wolves are considered a medicine being associated with courage, strength, loyalty, and success at hunting.

=== Arctic and Canada ===
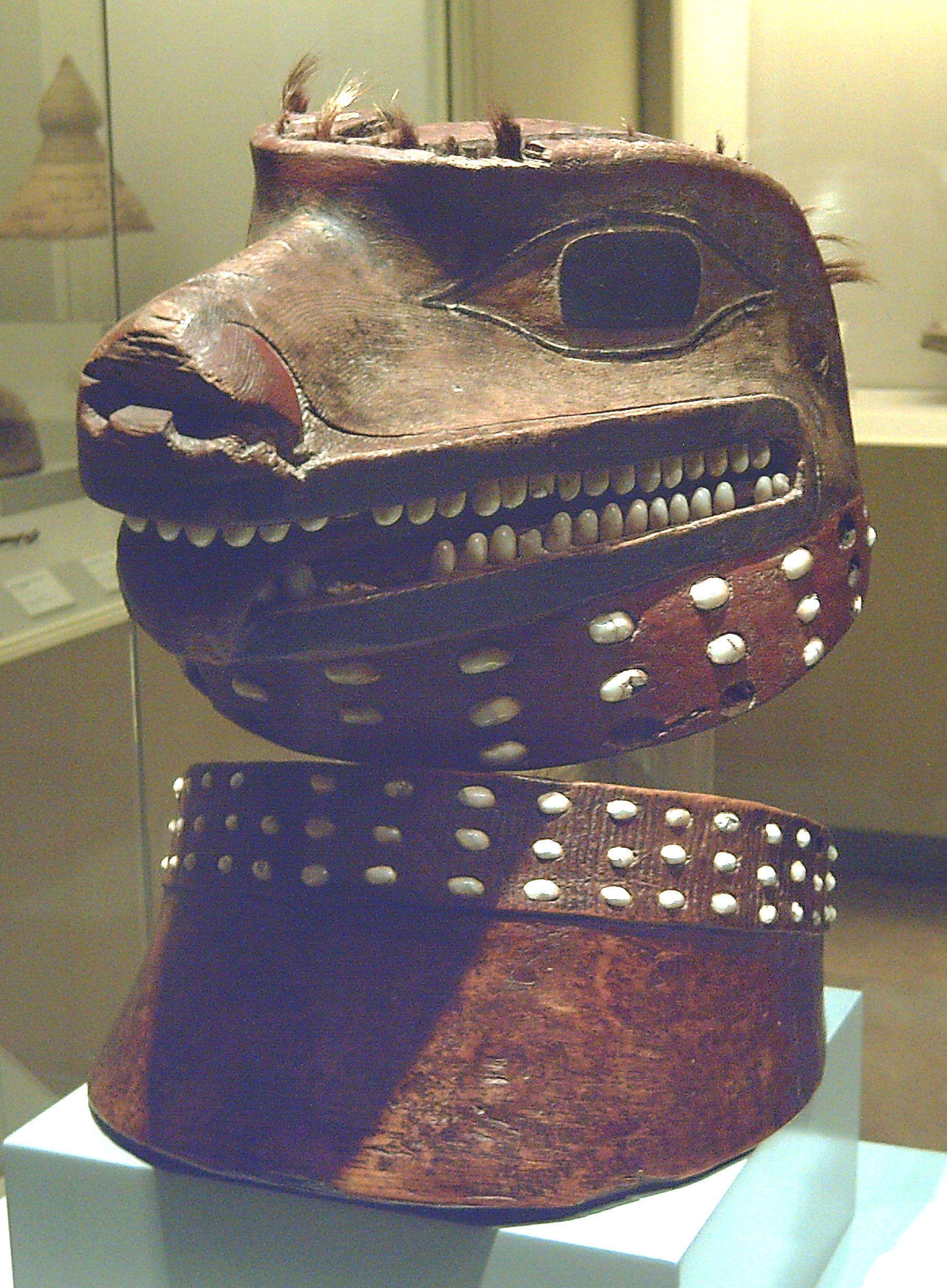
Helmet and collar representing a wolf, at the Museum of the Americas in Madrid. Made of wood, shell and made in the 18th century by Tlingit indigenous people, from the North American Pacific Northwest Coast. Tlingit people admired and feared wolves for their strength and ferocity.

Wolves were generally revered by Aboriginal Canadians that survived by hunting, but were thought little of by those that survived through agriculture. Some Alaska Natives including the Nunamiut of both northern and northwestern Alaska respected the wolf's hunting skill and tried to emulate the wolf in order to hunt successfully. First Nations such as Naskapi as well as Squamish and Lil'wat view the wolf as a daytime hunting guide. The Naskapis believed that the caribou afterlife is guarded by giant wolves that kill careless hunters who venture too near. The Netsilik Inuit and Takanaluk-arnaluk believed that the seawoman Nuliayuk's home was guarded by wolves. Wolves were feared by the Tsilhqot'in, who believed that contact with wolves would result in nervous illness or death. The Dena'ina believed wolves were once men, and viewed them as brothers.

=== United States ===
Wolves are important figures in a number of Native American cultures, with the wolf's dedication to its pack, in particular, inspiring many of the beliefs and symbolism associated with them.

The Tsitsista (Cheyenne), Lakota, Dakota, Siksikaitsitapi (Blackfoot), Assiniboine, Arikara, Arapaho, Osage, Shoshone, and Pawnee all tell stories of wolves as role models who taught people how to hunt. Many of the stories involve mutual support between people and wolves. Several of these tribes have warrior groups named after wolves. The Tsitsista call wolves the masters of the grasslands and protectors of all animals; hunters would call wolves to share their kill in the same manner that a wolf calls upon the raven, fox, and coyote to share. The Siksikaitsitapi consider wolves to be friends with humans, and believe against shooting them. In Pawnee spiritual stories, the wolf was the first creature to experience death.

The Lenape have three major clans, one of which is the Wolf clan; the other two are the Turtle and Turkey.

Mexican wolves and related subspecies are important to many tribes in the Southwestern United States, including the Apache, Akimel O'odham/Pima, Diné/Navajo, Hopi, and Havasupai. Several of these tribes have traditional stories, names and rituals associated with wolves. Further information: Mexican wolf § History

=== Mexico ===
Mexican wolves were importantly symbolic in Teotihuacan and other Pre-Columbian Mexican cultures. They were considered representative of the Sun, war, and the god Xolotl.

== Abrahamic traditions ==
=== Judaism ===
In the Tanakh (Hebrew Bible), the wolf symbolizes the ancient Israelite Tribe of Benjamin. This symbol originates from Genesis 49:27, when the patriarch Jacob blesses his youngest son: "Benjamin is a ravenous wolf; In the morning he consumes the foe, And in the evening he divides the spoil.” This symbolism has been interpreted by scholars to reference such attributes as the tribe's fearless and often warlike nature (Judges 21), and to refer to some notable victorious members of the Tribe, such as King Saul and Mordecai. The Temple in Jerusalem was traditionally said to be partly in the territory of the Tribe of Benjamin (but mostly in that of Judah), and some traditional interpretations of the Blessing consider the ravenous wolf to refer to the Temple's altar which devoured biblical sacrifices. The wolf has appeared as a literary and illustrated symbol for the Tribe of Benjamin across Jewish, Samaritan, and Christian artwork - including in places of worship, bibles, and prayer books – for centuries.

In the Book of Isaiah (11:6), the titular prophet predicts that in the utopian Messianic Age, "The wolf shall dwell with the lamb." Wolves in the Tanakh and other Jewish literature are often portrayed as predators of livestock, other wildlife, and occasionally, humans. The prophet Jeremiah (5:6) warns that "The wolf of the desert ravages them" as a divine punishment against transgressors. The scholar Rashi interpreted this wolf as a representation of the antagonistic Kingdom of Media.

Medieval Jewish folklorist Berechiah ha-Nakdan wrote about wolves extensively as characters in his Mishlè Shu'alim (Fox Fables). Late Victorian Anglo-Jewish stories, such as those by Israel Zangwill and Samuel Gordon, sympathetically liken the close-knit, dispersed, and persecuted Jewish community to Europe's wolves; loyal, family-oriented animals that had been killed and stereotyped unjustly due to prejudice from a Christian-majority Europe. The authors specifically focus on Jewish brotherhood in comparison to wolves' pack dedication. The Hebrew and Yiddish words for wolf, Ze'ev (זְאֵב) and Velvel (װעלװעל), are historically common first names for Jews.

=== Christianity ===
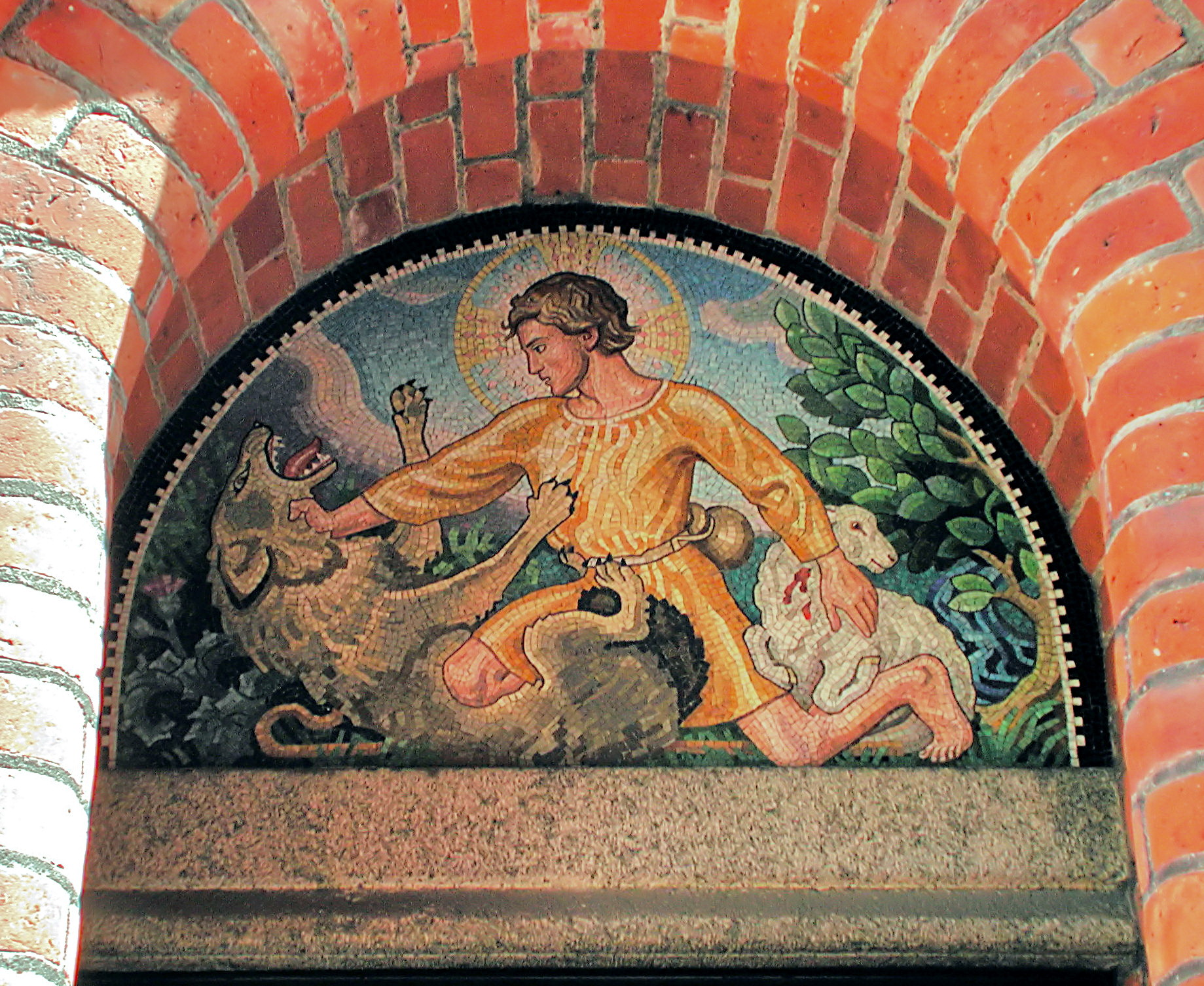
A mosaic on the entrance of a Church in Denmark depicting the Good Shepherd protecting a lamb from a wolf

The Bible contains 13 references to wolves, usually as metaphors for greed and destructiveness. In the New Testament, Jesus is quoted to have used wolves as illustrations to the dangers His followers would have faced should they follow him (Matthew 10:16, Acts 20:29, Matthew 7:15)

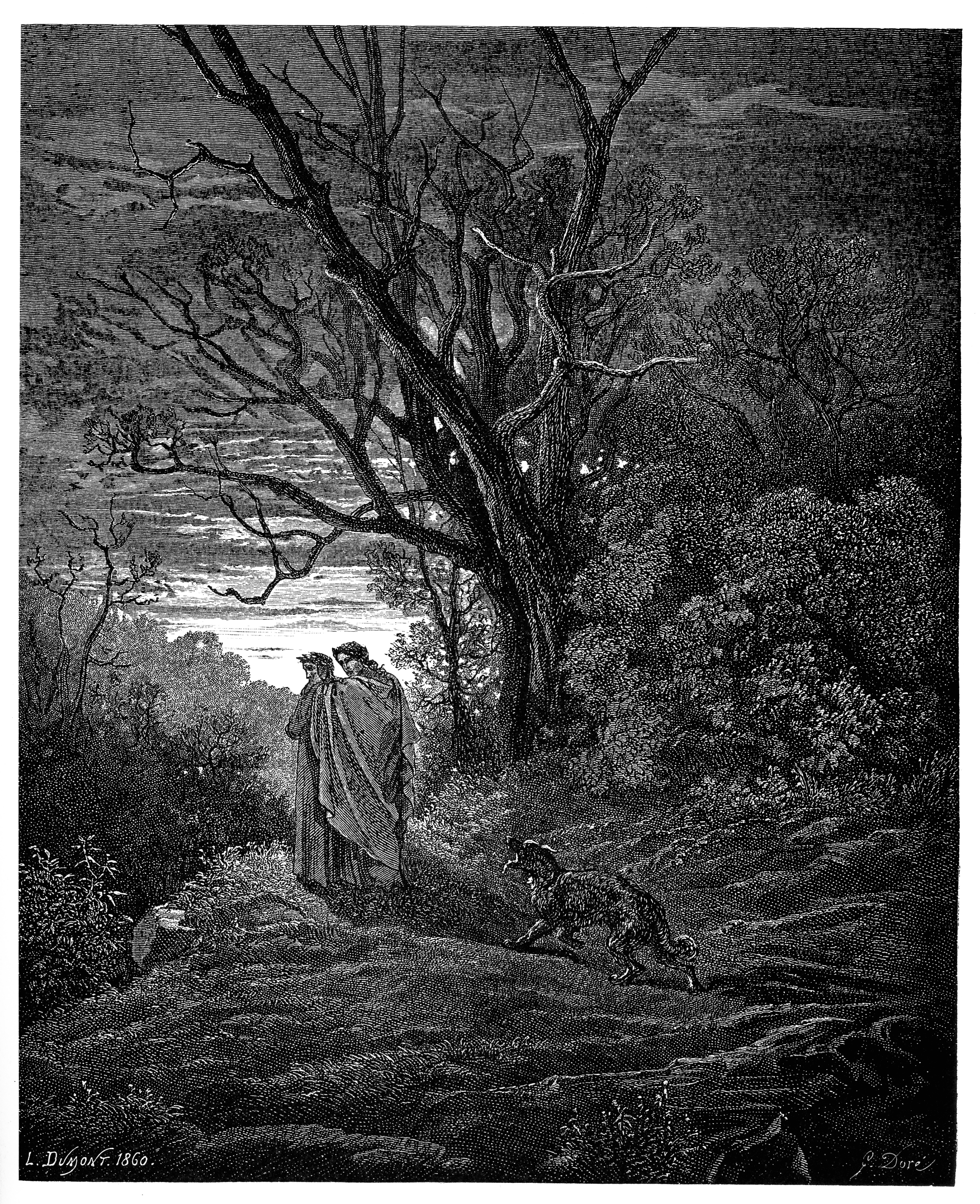
Virgil leads Dante away from the she-wolf in Inferno Canto 1 lines 87–88 as drawn by Gustave Doré, 1861

The Book of Genesis was interpreted in medieval Europe as stating that nature exists solely to support man (Genesis 1:29), who must cultivate it (Genesis 2:15), and that animals are made for his own purposes (Genesis 2:18–20). The wolf is repeatedly mentioned in the scriptures as an enemy of flocks: a metaphor for evil men with a lust for power and dishonest gain, as well as a metaphor for Satan preying on innocent God-fearing Christians (Matthew 7:15), contrasted with the shepherd Jesus who keeps his flock safe (John 10:12). The Roman Catholic Church often used the negative imagery of wolves to create a sense of real devils prowling the real world. Quoting from Leviticus and Deuteronomy, the Malleus Maleficarum states that wolves are either agents of God sent to punish sinners, or agents of the Devil sent with God's blessing to harass true believers to test their faith.

However, legends surrounding Saint Francis of Assisi show him befriending a wolf. According to the Fioretti, the city of Gubbio was besieged by the Wolf of Gubbio, which devoured both livestock and men. Francis of Assisi, who was living in Gubbio at the time, took pity on the townsfolk and went up into the hills to find the wolf. Soon, fear of the animal had caused all his companions to flee, but the saint pressed on and when he found the wolf, he made the sign of the cross, commanding the wolf to come to him and hurt no one. Miraculously, the wolf closed his jaws and lay down at the feet of St. Francis. "Brother Wolf, you do much harm in these parts and you have done great evil ..." said Francis. "All these people accuse you and curse you... But brother wolf, I would like to make peace between you and the people." Then, Francis led the wolf into the town, and surrounded by startled citizens he made a pact between them and the wolf. Because the wolf had "done evil out of hunger", the townsfolk were to feed the wolf regularly and, in return, the wolf would no longer prey upon them or their flocks. In this manner, Gubbio was freed from the menace of the predator. Francis, ever the lover of animals, even made a pact on behalf of the town dogs, that they would not bother the wolf again.

In Canto I of Dante's Inferno, the pilgrim encounters a she-wolf blocking the path to a hill bathed in light. The she-wolf represents the sins of concupiscence and incontinence. She is prophesized by the shade of Virgil to one day be sent to Hell by a greyhound.

Much of the symbolism Jesus used in the New Testament revolved around the pastoral culture of Israel, and explained his relationship with his followers as analogous to that of a good shepherd protecting his flock from wolves. An innovation in the popular image of wolves started by Jesus includes the concept of the wolf in sheep's clothing, which warns people against false prophets. Several authors have proposed that Jesus's portrayal of wolves, comparing them to dangerous and treacherous people, was an important development in perceptions on the species, which legitimized centuries of subsequent wolf persecution in the western world. Subsequent medieval Christian literature followed and expanded upon Biblical teachings on the wolf. It appeared in the seventh century edition of the Physiologus, which infused pagan tales with the spirit of Christian moral and mystical teaching. The Physiologus portrays wolves as being able to strike men dumb on sight, and of having only one cervical vertebra. Dante included a she-wolf, representing greed and fraud, in the first canto of the Inferno. The Malleus Maleficarum, first published in 1487, states that wolves are either agents of God sent to punish the wicked, or agents of Satan, sent with God's blessing to test the faith of believers.

The hagiography of the 16th Century Blessed Sebastian de Aparicio includes the account that in his youth, his life was saved in a seemingly-miraculous way by a wolf. During an outbreak of the bubonic plague in his town in 1514, his parents were forced to isolate him from the community in quarantine, and built a hidden shelter for him in the woods, where they left him. While lying there helpless, due to his illness, a she-wolf found the hiding spot and, poking her head into his hiding spot, sniffed and then bit and licked an infected site on his body, before running off. He began to heal from that moment.

=== Islam ===
Wolves are mentioned three times in the Qur'an, specifically in the Sura Yusuf.

12.13: "He said: Surely it grieves me that you should take him off, and I fear lest the wolf devour him while you are heedless of him."

12.14: "They said: Surely if the wolf should devour him notwithstanding that we are a (strong) company, we should then certainly be losers."

12.17: "They said: O our father! Surely we went off racing and left Yusuf by our goods, so the wolf devoured him, and you will not believe us though we are truthful."

== Modern folklore, literature and pop culture ==
The popular image of the wolf is significantly influenced by the Big Bad Wolf from Aesop's Fables and Grimm's Fairy Tales. The Christian symbolism where the wolf represents the devil, or evil, being after the "sheep" who are the living faithful, is found frequently in western literature. In Milton's Lycidas the theological metaphor is made explicit:

"The hungry Sheep look up, and are not fed / But swoln with wind, and the rank mist they draw / Rot inwardly and foul contagian spread: Besides what the grim Woolf with privy paw / Daily devours apace"

The wolf in the Scandinavian tradition as either representing the warrior or protector, sometimes combined with the Christian symbolism as the wolf representing evil or the devil, came to be a popular attribute in the heavy metal music subculture, used by bands such as Powerwolf, Sonata Arctica, Marduk, Watain, Wintersun, and Wolf.

Many recent animated films have portrayed wolves in a sympathetic light, such as Balto, Princess Mononoke, The Secret of Kells, and Wolfwalkers. Princess Mononoke and Wolfwalkers both feature wolves in a spiritual guardian role as well as an ecological one, protecting their respective forests from human encroachment. In Walt Disney's The Jungle Book (1967 and 2016), the resident wolf pack are portrayed as dedicated and protective parents to the protagonist, Mowgli.

== See also ==
- Big Bad Wolf
- Little Red Riding Hood
- Throw to the wolves
- Werewolf
- Wolf of Gubbio
- Wolves in fiction
- Wolves in heraldry
- White Fang
- Foxes in popular culture
- African golden wolf § In culture

== Sources ==
- Beckwith, Christopher I. (16 March 2009). Empires of the Silk Road: A History of Central Eurasia from the Bronze Age to the Present. Princeton University Press. ISBN 978-1400829941.
- Eisler, Robert (1951). Man into wolf: an anthropological interpretation of sadism, 2, and lycanthropy. London: Routledge and Kegan Paul. ASIN B0000CI25D.
- Eliade, Mircea (1986). Zalmoxis, the vanishing God: comparative studies in the religions and folklore of Dacia and Eastern Europe. University of Chicago Press. ISBN 978-0226203850.
- Eliade, Mircea (1995). Ivănescu, Maria; Ivănescu, Cezar (eds.). De la Zalmoxis la Genghis-Han: studii comparative despre religiile și folclorul Daciei și Europei Orientale [From Zalmoxis to Genghis Khan: comparative studies in the religions and folklore of Dacia and Eastern Europe] (in Romanian) (Based on the translation from French of De Zalmoxis à Gengis-Khan, Payot, Paris, 1970 ed.). București, Romania: Humanitas. ISBN 978-9732805541.
- François, Anthony; Hulsewé, Paulus Hulsewé (1 January 1979). China in Central Asia: The Early Stage: 125 BC - AD 23; an Annotated Transl. of Chapters 61 and 96 of the History of the Former Han Dynasty. With an Introd. by M.A.N.Loewe. Brill Archive. ISBN 9004058842.
- Jeanmaire, Henri (1975). Couroi et courètes (in French). New York: Arno. ISBN 978-0405070013.
- Kusmina, Elena Efimovna (2007). The Origin of the Indo-Iranians. Brill. ISBN 978-0521299442.
- Lopez, Barry H. (1978). Of Wolves and Men. J. M. Dent and Sons Limited. ISBN 978-0-7432-4936-2.
- Marvin, Garry (2012). Wolf. Reaktion Books. ISBN 978-1-86189-879-1.
- Mech, L. David; Boitani, Luigi, eds. (2003). Wolves: Behaviour, Ecology and Conservation. University of Chicago Press. ISBN 978-0-226-51696-7.
- Sinor, Denis (1 March 1990). The Cambridge History of Early Inner Asia, Volume 1. Cambridge University Press. ISBN 0521243041.
- Watson, Burton (1993). Records of the Grand Historian of China. Han Dynasty II. Chapter 123. The Account of Ta-yüan. New York City: Columbia University Press.
- Walker, Brett L. (2005). The Lost Wolves Of Japan. University of Washington Press. ISBN 978-0-295-98492-6.
- Zambotti, Pia Laviosa (1954). I Balcani e l'Italia nella Preistoria (in Italian). Como.
