= Jewish literature =

Jewish literature includes works written by Jews on Jewish themes, literary works written in Jewish languages on various themes, and literary works in any language written by Jewish writers. Ancient Jewish literature includes Biblical literature and rabbinic literature. Medieval Jewish literature includes not only rabbinic literature but also ethical literature, philosophical literature, mystical literature, various other forms of prose including history and fiction, and various forms of poetry of both religious and secular varieties. The production of Jewish literature has flowered with the modern emergence of secular Jewish culture. Modern Jewish literature has included Yiddish literature, Judeo-Tat literature, Ladino literature, Hebrew literature (especially Israeli literature), and Jewish American literature.

== Medieval Jewish literature ==
=== Fiction ===
Prominent examples of medieval Jewish fiction included:

- Sefer ha-Ma'asiyyot, by Nissim b. Jacob b. Nissim ibn Shahin of Kairouan, written in Arabic, a book of fables based on aggadic legends.
- Sefer Sha'ashu'im, by Joseph Ibn Zabara (12th century), a story combining folktales, epigrams, and passages of philosophy and science.
- Ben ha-Melekh ve-ha-Nazir, by Abraham b. Samuel ha-Levi Ibn Ḥasdai, based on an Indian tale based on the life of Buddha.
- Meshal ha-Kadmoni, by Isaac ibn Sahula (13th century), combining aggadah with original stories
- Mishlei Shu'alim ("Fox Fables"), by Berechiah ben Natronai ha-Nakdan, Hebrew fables which resemble Aesop's fables.

=== Poetry ===
Liturgical Jewish poetry (Piyyut) flourished in the Byzantine Palestine in the seventh and eighth centuries with the writings of Yose ben Yose, Yannai, and Eleazar Kalir.

Later Spanish, Provençal, and Italian poets wrote both religious and secular poems. Particularly prominent poets were Solomon ibn Gabirol and Yehuda Halevi.

Little writing by Jewish women survives from this period. One Arabic stanza is attributed to the seventh-century Sarah of Yemen, who may have been Jewish; one stanza in Hebrew by the wife of Dunash ben Labrat survives from the tenth century; and three poems in Arabic attributed to the Andalusian woman Qasmuna survive from the twelfth. The first female Jewish poet to write poetry in German was Rachel Akerman (1522–1544), who wrote a poem titled "Geheimniss des Hofes" (The Mystery of the Courts), in which she described the intrigues of courtiers. A female Jewish poet writing in Yiddish during the same period was Rebecca bat Meir Tiktiner, author of a poem about Simchat Torah in forty couplets.

Most medieval Hebrew poetry was mono-rhymed with quantitative metre influenced by the style of Jewish poets from fallen Al-Andalus. One noted exception are two passages from Sefer Hakhmoni by Shabbethai Donnolo (sometimes classified as rhymed prose "saj" according to the prosodic classifications borrowed from Arabic tradition) because they are not quantitatively metered.

=== Other medieval Jewish literature ===
Medieval Jewish literature also includes:

- Jewish philosophical literature
- mystical (Kabbalistic) literature
- musar literature, ethical literature dealing with virtues and vices
- Halakhic literature
- Commentaries on the Bible
- Judeo-Arabic literature

== Modern Jewish literature ==
Modern Jews continued to write standard forms of rabbinic literature: Jewish philosophical literature, mystical (Kabbalistic) literature, musar (ethical) literature, halakhic literature, and commentaries on the Bible.

The modern era also saw the creation of what is generally known as "modern Jewish literature," which emerged from the writings of the Haskalah and broke with religious traditions about literature. Therefore, it can be distinguished from rabbinic literature which is distinctly religious in character. Modern Jewish literature also contributed to the national literatures of many of the countries in which Jews lived.

=== Eighteenth-century Hebrew literature ===
It was with Moses Hayyim Luzzatto (1707–1746) that Hebrew poetry shook off the medieval fetters which hindered its free development. His allegorical drama "La-Yesharim Tehillah" (1743), which may be regarded as the first product of modern Hebrew literature, has been described as "a poem that in its classic perfection of style is second only to the Bible." In Amsterdam, Luzzatto's pupil, David Franco Mendes (1713–92), in his imitations of Jean Racine ("Gemul 'Atalyah") and of Metastasio ("Yehudit"), continued his master's work, though his works are not as respected as were Luzzatto's. In Germany, the leader of the Haskalah movement Naphtali Hartwig Wessely (1725–1805) has been regarded as the "poet laureate" of his era. Luzzatto and Wessely also wrote works of ethical musar literature, and Luzzatto's Mesillat Yesharim gained particular prominence.

=== Nineteenth-century Hebrew literature ===
(See also: Revival of the Hebrew language)
In Galicia, important literary artists included: Nachman Krochmal (1785–1840); Solomon Judah Loeb Rapoport (1790–1867); and the satirical poet and essayist Isaac Erter (1792–1841); and lyric poet and translator Meir Halevi Letteris (1815–1874). Writers in Amsterdam included the poet Samuel Molder (1789–1862). Writers in Prague included the haskalah leader Jehudah Loeb Jeiteles (1773–1838), author of witty epigrams ("Bene ha-Ne'urim") and of works directed against Hasidism and against superstition. Writers in Hungary included: the poet Solomon Lewison of Moor (1789–1822), author of "Melitzat Yeshurun"; the poet Gabriel Südfeld, father of Max Nordau; and the poet Simon Bacher. Romanian writers of note included Julius Barasch. Italian Jewish writers included: I. S. Reggio (1784–1854); Joseph Almanzi; Hayyim Salomon; Samuel Vita Lolli (1788–1843); Rachel Morpurgo (1790–1860), whose poems evince religious piety and a mystic faith in Israel's future; and Samuel David Luzzatto (1800–65), who has been described as the first modern writer to introduce religious romanticism into Hebrew.

Hebrew writers in the Russian empire included: the poet Jacob Eichenbaum; the Haskalah leader Isaac Baer Levinsohn; Kalman Schulman (1826–1900), who introduced the romantic form into Hebrew; the romantic poet Micah Joseph Lebensohn (1828–52); the "father of prose," Lithuanian author M. A. Ginzburg; and "the father of poetry," Lithuanian poet Abraham Baer Lebensohn, whose poems "Shire Sefat Kodesh" were extraordinarily successful. The creator of the Hebrew novel was Abraham Mapu (1808–67), whose historical romance "Ahabat Tziyyon" exercised an important influence on the development of Hebrew. The poet Judah Leib (Leon) Gordon was a satirist who has been characterized as "an implacable enemy of the Rabbis."

=== Early 20th century Hebrew literature ===
Hayim Nahman Bialik (1873–1934) was one of the pioneers of modern Hebrew poetry and came to be recognized as Israel's national poet. Bialik contributed significantly to the revival of the Hebrew language. His influence is felt deeply in all subsequent Hebrew literature. Another prominent Hebrew poet of Bialik's era was Shaul Tchernichovsky (1875–1943), who is especially well known for his nature poetry and for his interest in the culture of ancient Greece.

=== Israeli literature ===
Among Israeli writers, Shmuel Yosef Agnon won the Nobel Prize for Literature for novels and short stories that employ a unique blend of biblical, Talmudic and modern Hebrew. Other Israeli authors whose works have been translated into other languages and who have attained international recognition include Ephraim Kishon, Yaakov Shabtai, A. B. Yehoshua, Amos Oz, Irit Linur, Etgar Keret and Yehoshua Sobol.

=== Yiddish literature ===
Modern Yiddish literature is generally dated to the publication in 1864 of Sholem Yankev Abramovitsh’s novel Dos kleyne mentshele (“The Little Person”). The most important of the early writers to follow Abramovitsh were Sholem Rabinovitsh, popularly known by his alter-ego, Sholem Aleichem, and I. L. Peretz. Later Yiddish writers of note include S.L. Shneiderman, Abraham Sutzkever, Isaac Bashevis Singer, who won the Nobel Prize in 1978, and Chaim Grade.

=== American Jewish literature ===
American Jewish literature written in English includes the works of Gertrude Stein, Henry Roth, Saul Bellow, Merrill Joan Gerber, Norman Mailer, Bernard Malamud, Alicia Ostriker, Chaim Potok, and Philip Roth. The poetry of Allen Ginsberg often touches on Jewish themes (notably the early autobiographical works such as Howl and Kaddish). Recent Jewish-American literature includes the writings of Paul Auster, Michael Chabon, Joshua Cohen, Jonathan Safran Foer and Art Spiegelman.

=== German Jewish literature ===
Jewish authors who wrote in German and made outstanding contributions to world literature include the German poet Heinrich Heine and the Bohemian novelist Franz Kafka.

Other significant German-Jewish poets and essayists include Berthold Auerbach, Paul Celan, Else Lasker-Schüler, Ernst Lissauer, Jacob Raphael Fürstenthal, Siegfried Einstein, Karl Marx, Nelly Sachs, Karl Kraus, Egon Friedell, and Erich Mühsam.

German-Jewish novelists include Lion Feuchtwanger, Edgar Hilsenrath, Alfred Döblin, Arthur Schnitzler, Anna Seghers, Hermann Broch, Franz Werfel, Joseph Roth, Jakob Wassermann, and Stefan Zweig.

The Bibliographia Judaica, published by Elazar Benyoëtz and Renate Heuer, the largest encyclopedia on ethnic Jewish authors who wrote in the German language, contains around 5,000 names.

=== Russian-language Jewish literature ===
Isaak Babel (1894–1940) was a Soviet journalist, playwright, and short story writer acclaimed as "the greatest prose writer of Russian Jewry." Other Russian writers of Jewish descent include Boris Pasternak (who never wrote on Jewish themes); Joseph Brodsky, a poet who won the Nobel Prize in 1987; Osip Mandelstam, another famous poet, wooer of Akhmatova, and victim of the Soviets. Vassily Grossman's experiences in WWII provide the main material for his novels.

=== Ladino Literature ===
The primary forms of modern Ladino literature have been fables and folktales. Ladino fables and folktales often have Jewish themes, with biblical figures and legendary characters, and many of them feature the folk character "Ejoha" (also "Joha"). In 2001, the Jewish Publication Society published the first English translation of Ladino folk tales, collected by Matilda Koén-Sarano, Folktales of Joha, Jewish Trickster: The Misadventures of the Guileful Sephardic Prankster.

Modern Ladino poets include Margalit Matitiahu, Ilan Stavans, Avner Peretz, Victor Perera, Rita Gabbai Simantov, and Sara Benveniste Benrey.

=== Judeo-Tat literature ===
A connoisseur of the Judeo-Tat folklore, Hizgil Avshalumov created a folklore image of the witty (Juhuri: Шими Дербенди) - Shimi from Derbent. (Mountain Jewish analogue of Hershel of Ostropol)

A number of poets of the 20th century created their works in the Judeo-Tat language, such as Sergey Izgiyayev, creates (Juhuri: Иму гъэлхэнд шолуминим) - "We are the defenders of the World" (1952), (Juhuri: Фикиргьой шогьир) - "Thoughts of the Poet" (1966), (Juhuri: Муьгьбет ве гьисмет) - "The fate and love" (1972) and a number of other works. Shimshun Safonov, in 1968, created a collection of poetry (Juhuri: Парза, ма‘ни ма) - "Fly, my verse." Poetess Zoya Semenduyeva has released a collection (Juhuri: Войгей дуьл) - "The Command of the Heart". In 2007, her book was published (Juhuri: Духдер эн дуь бебе) - "Daughter of two fathers".
