= Eliyahu Menachem of London =

English rabbi (1220–1284)

Eliyahu Menachem of London (1220-1284) was a rabbi and communal leader in 13th-century England.

He is not to be confused with Elias of London (Elijah ben Moses or Elias le Evesque), the chief rabbi of English Jewry from 1243-1257.

== Biography ==
He was born to one of the leading families of English Jewry at the time, which held many official positions until the final expulsion in 1290. His family had its origin in the Rhineland, unlike most English Jews whose family origin was in France. His father was Moses of London. His brother was Berechiah de Nicole. His nephew was Hagin Deulacres.

In his youth he was sent to study in France, apparently in Sens in one of the Tosafist academies. In 1251 he wrote his commentary to the Mishnah, and then returned to London. For the next three decades he engaged in business, finance, and real estate in England. Many details of his business history are recorded, including dealings with the king and queen. In the Second Barons' War his family lost much property, but were physically unharmed and apparently managed to escape to Normandy. When the fighting ceased, they returned to England and resumed business. When legal restrictions were placed on the Jews in the 1270s, Eliyahu and his brothers were given an exemption from some of them. In addition to business, he also served as a doctor.

He was known among Jews as a leading halachic authority, quoted under the name R"M meLondrish or HaRav meLondrish in such works as that of Mordechai ben Hillel. A few of his rulings are observed by Jews to this day. He was also involved in mysticism.
