= Isaac of Chernigov =

Isaac of Chernigov was a Jewish scholar in the Kievan Rus' of the twelfth century, frequently consulted by his contemporaries on questions of Biblical exegesis. He is probably identical with Isaac of Russia, found in the English records of 1181. His explanation of the term yabam, for which he finds a parallel in the Old East Slavic language, is quoted by Moses ben Isaac ha-Nessiah of London in his lexicon Sefer ha-Shoham. Leopold Zunz, and after him Abraham Harkavy, see in this explanation evidence that the Jews living in Rus' in the time of Isaac of Chernigov spoke the vernacular of the country.

== Bibliography ==
- Zunz, Ritus, p. 73;
- Harkavy, Ha-Yehudim u-Sefat ha-Selavim, pp. 14, 62;
- Neubauer, in Allg. Zeit. des Jud. 1865, No. 17;
- Jacobs, Jews of Angevin England, pp. 66, 73;
- J. Q. R. ii. 329.
