= Jacob ben Judah of London =

Jacob ben Judah Hazzan was a 13th-century Jewish legal codifier based in London, England. His grandfather was one Jacob he-Aruk (possibly Jacob le Long). In 1287 Jacob wrote Etz Chaim a ritual code in two parts, containing 646 sections respectively, dealing with the whole sphere of Halakah, and following in large measure Maimonides in the Mishneh Torah, though Jacob utilized also the Halakot Gedolot, the Siddur of Amram Gaon, and the works of Moses of Coucy, Alfasi and the tosafists. He quotes, furthermore, Isaac ben Abraham, Moses of London and Berechiah de Nicole (Lincoln). Some verses by him are also extant.

The Etz Chaim still exists in a manuscript which formerly belonged to Johann Christoph Wagenseil and is now in the Rathsbibliothek in Leipzig. The work is of interest as the chief literary production of an English Jew before the Edict of Expulsion of 1290, and gives an account of the ritual followed by the Jews of England at that date.

A partial edition was published by Hermann Adler in Leipzig, 1896.
