= Margalit Matitiahu =

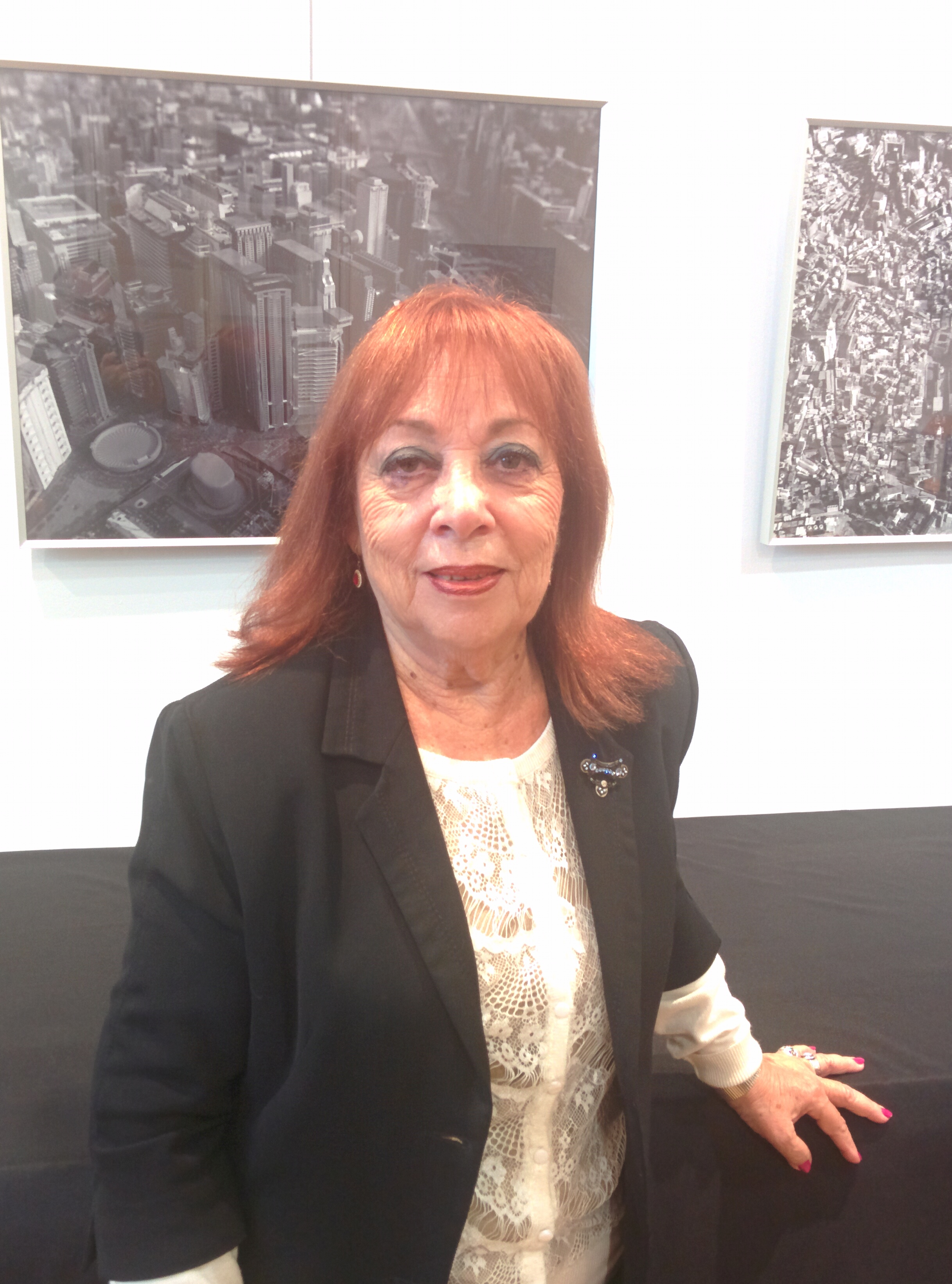
Margalit Matitiahu in Madrid, 2017

Margalit Matitiahu (Hebrew: מרגלית מתתיהו; born 1935, in Tel Aviv) is a poet in Ladino and Hebrew from Israel.

After the Holocaust, her parents moved to Israel from Thessaloniki, Greece where they were Sephardi Jews who were descendants of Jews from León. She studied Hebrew Literature and Philosophy at Bar Ilan University.

She started writing in Hebrew and in 1988 she published Curtijo Quemado (later in Vela de luz) in Ladino, which is a testimony of Nazi destruction. She has worked as a presenter in radio and investigated her mother tongue. She is a member of the World Academy of Art and Culture (having received a doctorate Honoris Causa), of the Israel PEN club and of the Hebrew Writers Association in Israel. She has been awarded several prizes:

- the 1994 "Fernando Jeno Award" the international prize for Jewish literature giving by the Jewish community of Mexico.
- the 1996 "Ateneo de Jaen Award", the international literature prize for poetry in Jaen, Andalucia, Spain.
- the 1999 Israeli Prime Minister's Prize for Hebrew Writers
- the 2003 "Poetry Award" the international prize for poetry given by the "Orient-Occident" Academy of Curtea de Arges, Romania

Giusepina Gerometa from University of Udine wrote her PhD thesis on The poetry of Margalit Matitiahu in 2001–2002. This was the first thesis on contemporary modern Sephardic poetry. The second thesis (on translation) was written by Sonja Bertok from University of Trieste in 2003–2004.

== Documentary films 2004–2008 ==
- Production of documentary films: The series of "Sefarad Ways and life"
- Work with her son Jack Matitiahu – director and photographer of the series. The two films of the series were presented in Israel, Spain, Toronto, Canada, London. The films are:
- "Leon reencounter"
- "Toledo the hidden secret"

== Sample verse ==
Me visto tu cara sobre la mia,
Y con tus ojos veo tu ermosa sivdad natal.
La tristesa y la maravilla te anvelopan,
En viendo lugares que ya no los conoses mas.

Translation:

I have seen your face over mine,
And I see your beautiful birth town within your eyes.
Sadness and wonder envelop you,
By seeing places you do not know anymore.

== Her works ==
=== In Hebrew ===
- Through the Glass Window (1976)
- No Summer Silence (1979)
- White Letters (1983)
- Handcuffed (1987)
- Midnight Stairs (1995)
- To wake the silence (2005)

=== In Ladino ===
- Alegrica (1993)
- Matriz de luz & Vela de la luz (1997)
- Kamino de Tormento (2000)
- Vagabondo Eternel & Bozes en la Shara (2001)
- Canton de solombra (2005)
- Asiguiendo al esfuenio (2006)
