= Rita Gabbai-Simantov =

Greek Ladino-language poet and writer

Rita Gabbai-Simantov (born 1935 in Athens, Greece) is a Jewish writer of Sephardic origin, known for her poetry written in Ladino.

== Biography ==
The Nazis invaded Greece when she was a child, and in December 1942, her family managed to escape to Turkey by boat. They lived there until 1945, when the war ended and they returned to Greece.

While she learned to speak Ladino at home with her parents and especially with her grandfather and grandmother, her parents often spoke in French instead. But after she married a man who preferred speaking Ladino and began working in the Israeli Embassy in Athens as a cultural officer, Gabbai-Simantov came into greater contact with Sephardic culture and the Judeo-Spanish language.

In 1991, after the death of her husband, she visited Spain, and this contact with her ancestral country moved her to write her first poem, "Ermana Soledad." In 1992 she published her first poetry collection, Quinientos Anios Despues. Her second collection, Fuente de mi Tradision, was published in Athens in 1999. Her most recent poetry collection, Poezias de mi Vida, was published in 2007.

Gabbai-Simantov writes her poetry in Ladino. She also produced, in 2004, the first basic Ladino-Greek dictionary.

== Selected works ==
- Quinientos Anios Despues (1992)
- Fuente de mi Tradision (1999)
- Poezias de mi Vida (2007)
