= Meir of Norwich =

Meir ben Elijah of Norwich (Hebrew: מאיר בן אליהו מנורגיץ, romanized: Meïr ben Eliyahu mi-Norgits; fl. 13th century), also known as Meir of England, was a mediaeval English Jewish poet. He is acknowledged as the "chief representative of the poetic art among the Jews of medieval England."

Little is known of his life, but some scholars have speculated that he was among the Jews expelled from England in 1290. It is possible that Meir was a son of Elias Levesque.

One long elegiac poem and fifteen smaller ones by him are found in a Vatican manuscript, from which they were published by Abraham Berliner in 1887. Among them is the liturgical poem Oyevi bim’eirah tikkov ('Put a Curse on My Enemy'), decrying the persecution suffered by English Jews. His work shows the influence of both Ashkenazic and Sephardic piyyutim.
