= Aaron of Canterbury =

Aaron of Canterbury was an English rabbi and halakhic exegete, mentioned in Minhat Yehudah ("The Offering of Judah") by Judah ben Elazar on Deuteronomy xxvi.2, in association with Rashi and Rabbi Jacob of Orleans, and thus, seemingly, of the twelfth century. But a passage in the Close Roll of 1242 refers the decision in a divorce case to three "magistri," Mosse of London, Aaron of Canterbury, and Jacob of Oxford, and makes it probable that the Aaron mentioned in "Minhat Yehudah" was of the thirteenth century and acted as an ecclesiastical assessor, or dayyan, in London about 1242. If so, his name was Aaron fil (son of) Samson.
