= Berechiah ha-Nakdan =

Jewish exegete, ethical writer and grammarian

Berechiah ben Natronai Krespia ha-Nakdan
- ברכיה בן נטרונאי הנקדן
- Born: 12th-13th century

Philosophical work
- Era: Medieval philosophy
- Region: Jewish philosophy
- Main interests: Exegesis, ethics, grammar, translation, poetry, philosophy
- Notable works: Mishlè Shu'alim, Sefer ha-Ḥibbur

Berechiah ben Natronai Krespia ha-Nakdan (Hebrew: ברכיה בן נטרונאי הנקדן; fl. 12th–13th century) (Note: Sometimes spelled Berachya or Berachyah.) was a Jewish exegete, ethical writer, grammarian, translator, poet, and philosopher. His best-known works are Mishlè Shu'alim ("Fox Fables") and Sefer ha-Ḥibbur (The Book of Compilation).

== Biography ==
Little is known for certain about Berechiah's life and much discussion has taken place concerning his date and native country. He is thought to have lived sometime in the 12th or 13th century, and is likely to have lived in Normandy and England, with some placing him about 1260 in Provence. It is possible that he was a descendant of Jewish scholars of Babylonia. He also knew foreign languages and translated and adapted several books into Hebrew.

Berechiah's appellation ha-Nakdan ("the punctuator") suggests that Berechiah punctuated Hebrew books. Hermann Gollancz, on the other hand, conjectured that he had a brother, a French Tosaphist, called Samuel ha-Nakdan who is mentioned for the year 1175 and that Berechiah was not so much a punctuator of the Bible himself but hailed from a family of Nakdanim.

Joseph Jacobs argued that Berechiah lived in England toward the end of the 12th century. This was confirmed by Adolf Neubauer's discovery that, in the preface to his fables, Berechiah mentions the "turning of the wheels of fate to the island of the sea (England) for one to die and the other to live," a reference to the English massacres of 1190. There is evidence that he was the same person as the Benedictus le Puncteur mentioned in a late-twelfth century Oxford document who presented a gift to Richard I in 1194, as Berechiah means "blessed" (benedictus) and ha-Nakdan means "the punctuator" (le puncteur).

Berechiah's son, Elijah, who lived in Dreux, was a copyist and grammarian. In those of his texts which have survived he expresses his feeling of honour at his father's respected position and refers to him as a "tanna and pedant."

== Fox Fables ==
Berechiah is known chiefly as the author of Mishle Shu'alim (Hebrew: משלי שועלים, 'Fox Fables'), a set of over a hundred fables in rhymed prose, some of his own invention and some reworked from Aesop's Fables, the Talmud, and Eastern sources. Most were probably translated from the French fable collection Ysopet by Marie de France (though uncertainties about the exact dates of both authors preclude any final decision about which of them was the source for the other). Other likely sources include the Latin translations of Aesop by Romulus and Avianus and of the Panchatantra. Berechiah's work adds a layer of Biblical quotations and allusions to Aesop's tales, adapting them as a way to teach Jewish ethics.

The following fable (entitled The Wolf and the Animals) is one paralleled by Marie de France (no. 73), and derives from an Eastern source, probably the Vaka Jataka:

The Wolf, the Lion's prince and peer, as the foe of all flesh did appear; greedy and grinding, he consumed all he was finding. Birds and beasts, wild and tame, by their families urged to the same, brought against him before the Lion an accusation, as a monster worthy of detestation. Said His Majesty, "If he uses his teeth as you say, and causes scandal in this terrible way, I'll punish him in such a way as to save his neck, if I may, and yet prevent you becoming his prey." Said Lion to Wolf, "Attend me to-morrow, see that you come, or you'll come to much sorrow." He came, sure enough, and the Lion spoke to him harsh and rough. "What by doing this do you mean? Never more raven the living, or live by ravening. What you shall eat shall be only dead meat. The living you shall neither trap nor hunt. And that you may my words obey, swear me that you'll eat no flesh for two years from to-day, to atone for your sins, testified and seen: 'tis my judgment, you had better fulfil it, I ween." Thereat the Wolf swore right away no flesh to eat for two years from that day. Off went Sir Wolf on his way, King Lion stopped at court on his throne so gay. Nothing that's fleshy for some time did our Wolf eat, for like a gentleman he knew how his word to keep. But then came a day when he was a hungered and he looked hither and thither for meat, and lo, a fat sheep fair to look on and goodly to eat (Gen. iii. 6). Then to himself he said, "Who can keep every law?" and his thoughts were bewildered with what he saw. He said to himself, "It overcomes me the longing to eat, for two yearsday by day must I fast from meat. This is my oath to the king that I swore, but I've thought how to fulfil it as never before. Three sixty-five are the days in a year. Night is when you close your eyes; open them, then the day is near." His eyes he opened and closed straightway. It was evening and it was morning, one day (Gen. i. 6). Thus he winked until he had numbered two years, and his greed returned and his sin disappears. His eyes fix the goat (sic) they had seen and he said, "See beforehand I have atoned for my sin," and he seized the neck of the goat, broke it to pieces, and filled up his throat as he was wont to do before, and as of yore his hand was stretched out to the beasts, his peers, as it had been in former days and years.

Manuscripts exist at the Bodleian and Munich Libraries (written before 1268). The first published edition appeared in Mantua in 1557; another with a Latin version by M. Hanel followed from Prague in 1661. An English translation titled Fables of a Jewish Aesop appeared in 1967 and has since been republished.

== Other works ==
Sefer ha-Ḥibbur (Hebrew: ספר החיבור) is Berechiah's best-known philosophical work, wherein he develops on the works of Saadia Gaon, Bahya ibn Pakuda, and Solomon ibn Gabirol. Berechiah was also the author of an ethical treatise entitled Sefer Matzref, divided into thirteen chapters. In it he quotes Rabbi Abraham ibn Daud (died c. 1198) without the formula for the dead, so that it is quite probable that the book was composed before 1180. In these essays he invented several Hebrew terms for philosophical concepts.

In addition to these, Berechiah wrote a commentary on the Book of Job. He was acquainted with most of the grammarians of the 11th and 12th centuries, and his "Uncle Benjamin," whom he quotes, has been identified with Benjamin of Canterbury.

Berechiah was also a translator, his version being extant of Adelard of Bath's Quæstiones Naturales, entitled Dodi ve-Nekhdi or Ha-She'elot. He also wrote Ko'aḥ Avanim, a translation-adaption of a Latin lapidary containing a description of sixty-three species of stones and their magical properties. Besides these works, Berechiah is also said by Zunz to have contributed to the Tosafot, and, as his name implies, was probably an expert in Hebrew grammar, for which reason he is quoted by Moses ben Issac ha-Nessiah of London, in his Sefer ha-Shoham. As this work was probably written before 1215, these references confirm the date and place suggested above.

== See also ==
- Aesop among the Jews
