= Elias of London =

13th-century English Presbyter Judaeorum

Elias of London also known as Elijah ben Moses or Elias le Evesque, was Presbyter Judaeorum in 13th-century England.

He is not to be confused with Eliyahu Menachem of London, one of the Rishonim who lived from 1220-1284. Some of the below details, taken from the Jewish Encyclopedia article, may refer to Eliyahu Menachem.

== Biography ==
Elias of London succeeded Aaron of York and represented London at the so-called "Jewish Parliament" at Worcester in 1240, and in 1249 was allowed to have Abraham fil Aaron as his assistant. Henry III of England exacted from him no less a sum than £10,000, besides £100 a year for a period of four years.

Elias headed the deputation which asked the king's permission to leave the country in 1253. In 1255 he was imprisoned as a surety for the tallage of the Jews, and two years later he was deposed from office, being succeeded by his brother, Hagin (Hayyim). In 1259, according to Matthew Paris, he was said to have been converted to Christianity and confessed to having prepared poison for certain of the English nobles. In 1266, he was again treated as a Jew and compensation to the amount of £50 was granted him for losses he had incurred during the First Barons' War.

Elias remained one of the most important Jews of London in 1277, being one of the few who were granted permission to trade as merchants though they were not members of the Gild Merchant. He appears to have been a physician of some note for his aid was invoked by John II, Count of Holland in 1280, and he obtained permission to visit the count in that year.

At Elias' death, an inquest made upon his estate declared him to be possessed of personal property to the value of 400 marks and of houses of the yearly rental of 100 shillings. His widow Fluria was permitted to retain on payment to the king of 400 marks. One of his houses appears to have been located on Sporier Street near the Tower of London; at the Edict of Expulsion in 1290, it was granted to Chicksands Priory.

Elias was an expert in halakha, summoned before the king to decide questions. A responsum of his is quoted in one of the manuscripts of The Mordechai.

== Sources ==
Jewish Encyclopedia bibliography: Prynne, Short Demurrer, part ii., sub annis; Jacobs, in Papers of the Anglo-Jew. Hist. Exh. pp. 22, 45, 49-51; M. Paris, Chronica Majora, v. 398, 441, 730; Select Pleas of the Jewish Exchequer, ed. Rigg, pp. xxxiii., 86, 88, 130, London, 1902; Jacobs, in R. E. J. xviii. 259.G. J.
