= Moses ben Isaac ben ha-Nessiah =

English grammarian and lexicographer

Moses ben Isaac ben ha-Nessiah (Hebrew: משה בן יצחק בן הנשיאה) of London was an English grammarian and lexicographer of the late twelfth and early thirteenth centuries. His mother was probably a Jew nicknamed Comitissa of Cambridge.

In his youth he wrote a work (now lost) on Hebrew grammar entitled Leshon Limmudim; it is referred to in his Sefer ha-Shoham (Hebrew: ספר השהם), or "Onyx Book," the title of which is an anagram of his name. The latter work (part of which was published at Oxford in 1882) shows some knowledge of Arabic and of the works of Joseph Kimhi.

The tombstone of a Rabbi Moses, son of Rabbi Isaac, was found at Ludgate, London, in the time of Elizabeth; John Stow, in his "Survey of London" stated that it came from the Jewish cemetery in Jewin Street at the time of the barons' revolt against King John in 1215. If this is his tombstone Moses ben Isaac must have died before that date.

== Sources ==
- Jewish Encyclopedia bibliography: Renan-Neubauer, Les Rabbins Français, pp. 484–487; Winter and Wünsche, Die Jüdische Litteratur, ii. 205, 233; Rosin, in Monatsschrift, xxxii. 232-240; Jacobs, Jews of Angevin England, pp. 251, 253, 420.

== Bibliography ==
- Klar, Benjamin & Roth, C. Sefer ha-shoham, (The Onyx Book). Jewish Historical Society of England (1947).
