= Mishlè Shu'alim =

Collection of fables

Mishlè Shu'alim (Hebrew: משלי שועלים, "Fox fables") is a collection of mashal as fable, including fables about foxes, written, translated, and compiled by the English Jewish writer Berechiah ha-Nakdan in the 12th–13th century. Its title reflects an older Talmudic tradition of fox fables (משלות שועלים); for example Rabbi Meir was supposed to have known 300 of them, and it has appeared in modern Israeli popular culture through the Foxy Fables series.

Berechiah was a French native but lived in England. For his collection, which in the edition by A. M. Haberman has 119 fables, he relied in part on the Ysopet collection translated by Marie de France. One of the fables in the collection was appended by the French Jewish grammarian Cresben (or Cresbien) le Ponctateur, an acquaintance of Moses ben Jacob of Coucy.

One of the fables, "The Elephant and the Man of the Field", is to be read in the ongoing dispute between Jews and Christians about the role of the Torah. A hunter attempts to catch the Torah; the hunter, as is clear from the biblical references, represents Esau (who stands for Christian Rome), whereas the elephant stands for the Torah. A group of scholars helps the hunter; they represent the Christian polemic against Judaism. The hunter captures the elephant and symbolically terrorises the local population, that is, the Jews. Another fable, "The Camel and the Flea", derives from Genesis Rabbah.

== Editions and translations ==
The collection was edited and published in 1845–46 by A. M. Haberman, and in 1979 by Haim Schwarzbaum. An English translation with an introduction was published in 1967 by Moses Hadas.

- Haberman, A. M. (1945–1946). Mishle Shualim l'Rabbi Berekhyah ha-Naqdan. Jerusalem.
- Hadas, Moses (1967). Fables of a Jewish Aesop. New York.
- Schwarzbaum, Haim (1979). The Mishle Shu'alim (Fox Fables) of Rabbi Berechiah ha-Nakdan. Kiron: Institute for Jewish and Arab Folklore Research.
