= Moses of London =

Moses of London (died 1268), was a thirteenth-century English grammarian, halakhist and Jewish scholar in London. His Darkhe ha-Nikkud veha-Neginah is a treatise on Hebrew punctuation and accentuation.

He was a descendant of Moses of Bristol, himself a descendant of Rabbi Simeon the Great of Mainz. His sons were Eliyahu Menachem of London, who was also a physician,, Hagin ben Moses, and Berechiah de Nicole.
