= Berechiah de Nicole =

English Tosafist who lived at Lincoln, England (died, after 1270)

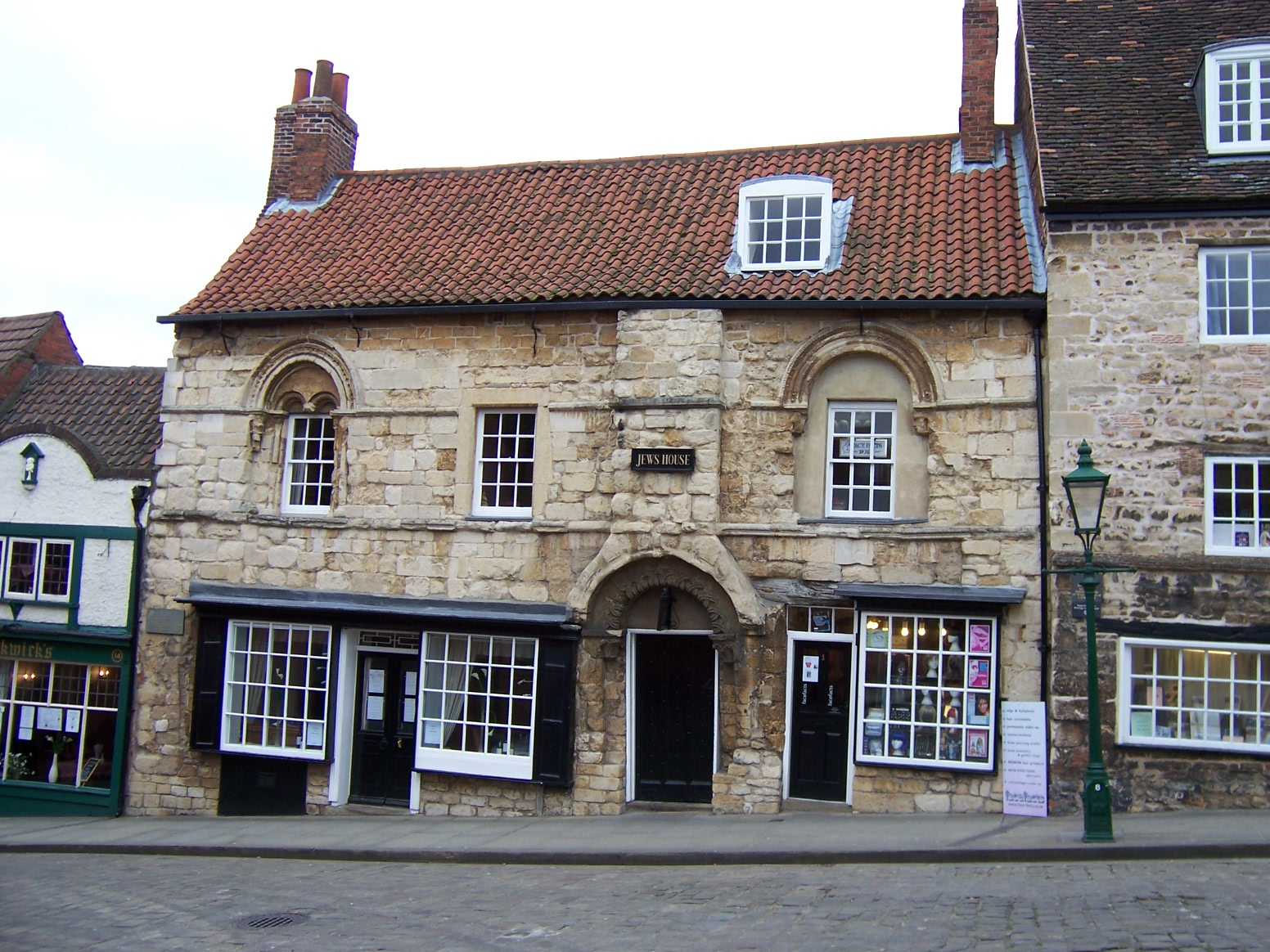
Frontage of the Jew's House

Berechiah de Nicole also known as Benedict fil Mosse, (c. 1225 – after 1270), was a thirteenth-century English Tosafist who lived at Lincoln.

== Biography ==
Berechiah was born in the first quarter of the 13th century, probably around 1225. He was the son of Rabbi Moses ben Yom-Tov of London and brother of several renowned Jewish figures of the period. Berechiah married the daughter of Joseph son of Aaron, one of the wealthiest Jews of Lincoln, and had at least four children: Solomon, Vives or Hagin (Haim), Manser (Menahem) and Belaset. The family lived in Lincoln (the Norman-French name of which was "Nicole"), and is traditionally believed to have resided in the house now known as the Jew's House in that city.

Berechiah is known to have owned three messuages in the city which he rented out. He may have also occasionally served as a scribe for business transactions, and perhaps also worked as a scribe of Jewish works. His name is mentioned in several places across Tosafist literature, and in some English documents he was described by the honorific 'Magister', typically associated with members of Jewish clergy. These indicate his involvement in rabbinical duties and the high regard he held in the eyes of the general populace of Ashkenazi Jewry as well as the (non-Jewish) English public.

It's been conjectured that many Jews from across England assembled in Lincoln to attend Berechiah's daughter Belaset's wedding toward around July or August of 1255, and this became the lead-off to the blood libel of Little Saint Hugh of Lincoln: The Jews of Lincoln were accused of assembling the Jews of England to plot the ritual murder of Hugh. Many of the Lincoln Jews were imprisoned and tried at London for complicity in this so-called ritual murder, among them Berechiah. Some of the Jews were indeed hanged as punishment, but most were set free after several months. Berechiah was released earlier than the rest of the Jews, on 7 January 1256, and the court ruled that his confiscated property was to be returned to him.

Sometime during the mid-1260s Berechiah lost property during riots in Lincoln that occurred as part of the Second Barons' War, and together with several other Lincoln Jews, received compensation from King Henry III in 1266.

His subsequent fate is unknown. Cecil Roth believed that he may have still been alive during the 1290 Expulsion of the Jews of England.

== Sources ==
Jewish Encyclopedia bibliography: Zunz, Z. G. p. 97; Renan-Neubauer, Les Rabbins Français, p. 441; Jacobs, in Trans. Jew. Hist. Soc. England, i. 102–111.G. J.

== Bibliography ==
- Roth, C. ‘Rabbi Berechiah of Nicole (Benedict of Lincoln)', Journal of Jewish Studies I ii (1948–49) 67–81.
