= Timeline of Lincoln =

Coordinates: 53.23272°N 0.537661°W

The following is a timeline of the history of the city of Lincoln, the county town of Lincolnshire in the East Midlands of England.

== Prior to 17th century ==
- Pre-Roman times – Most of Lincolnshire is inhabited by the Brythonic Corieltauvi people. The Iceni covers the area around modern day Grimsby. The language of the area at that time would have been the precursor to modern Welsh. The name Lincoln derives from the old Welsh ‘Lindo’ meaning Lake.
- AD 48 – The Romans conquer Lincolnshire, with little resistance from the Celtic inhabitants, and build a fort, which later becomes the site of a town.
- c. 60 – Second fort built for Legio IX Hispana.
- 71–77 – Garrisoned by Legio II Adiutrix.
- After c. 86 – Becomes Lindum Colonia, a settlement for retired soldiers.
- By c. 120 – Probable creation by Romans of the Foss Dyke as a navigable waterway from the River Trent to Lincoln.
- 3rd century – Newport Arch a Roman gate.
- 320 – Lincoln (Lindocolina, Lincolle, Nicole) is mentioned in the Itinerary of Antoninus.
- by c. 500 – Roman rule has ended and the inhabiting Brythonic population establishes the Kingdom of Lindsey.
- by c. 600 – The local Christian population comes under increasing pressure from invading Pagan Anglo-Saxon tribes who establish settlements in the area. Some lands are given to foreign mercenaries who have been employed by local rulers to defend vulnerable coastal areas.
- 870 – The area has fallen under the influence of the kingdom of Mercia.
- 877 – "The Danes established themselves at Lincoln."
- 918 (probable date) – Lincoln surrenders to the Danes, becoming one of the Five Boroughs of the Danelaw.
- 941 (probable date) – Amlaíb Cuarán (Olaf of York), joint King of Jórvík, takes the Five Boroughs from the Earl of Mercia.
- 942 – King Edmund captures the Five Boroughs.
- 11th century – St Mary le Wigford & St Peter at Gowts churches built.
- 1068 – The Normans complete the first Lincoln Castle.
- 1072 – Bishop Remigius de Fécamp moves his seat to Lincoln from Dorchester Abbey.
- 1075–1088 – Remigius begins construction of the first Lincoln Cathedral.
- 1092 – The first Lincoln Cathedral is consecrated soon after the death in May of Bishop Remigius.
- 1110 – A fire devastates Lincoln.
- 1121 – King Henry I orders the Foss Dyke navigation to be improved.
- 1123 – A fire devastates Lincoln.
- 1141
  - 2 February: The Anarchy: First Battle of Lincoln – Forces of King Stephen, having been besieging Lincoln Castle, are attacked and decisively defeated by Angevins and Welsh supporters loyal to Empress Matilda. After fierce fighting in the streets, Stephen is taken prisoner.
  - Lincoln Cathedral roof severely damaged by fire.
- mid 12th century – Jew's House built.
- 1157 – Lincoln is given a charter and authority to elect a council.
- 1157–1158 – Second crowning of Henry II of England in Wigford, probably at St Mary's Guildhall.
- c. 1160 – High Bridge built.
- 1170–1180 – Norman House (known as "Aaron the Jew's House") built and occupied by Aaron of Lincoln.
- c. 1180 – Synagogue at Jew's Court completed.
- 1185 – 11 April: The 1185 East Midlands earthquake destroys Lincoln Cathedral.
- 1190 – Anti-semitic violence spreads to Lincoln; Jews are forced to take refuge in the castle.
- 1192 – Reconstruction of Lincoln Cathedral begins under Bishop Hugh.
- 1206 – first record of a Mayor of Lincoln. The inaugural holder was one Adam son of Reginald.
- 1217 – 20 May: First Barons' War: Second Battle of Lincoln – Forces of Prince Louis of France, claimant to the throne of England, having taken the city but failed to capture the castle, are defeated by an English royal force under William Marshal, 1st Earl of Pembroke, who sack the city.
- 1226 – King Henry III holds a parliament in Lincoln.
- 1231 – Franciscan friars arrive in Lincoln.
- c. 1237 – Central tower of Cathedral collapses.
- 1238 – Dominican friars arrive in Lincoln.
- 1255 – 29 August: "Libel of Lincoln": A small boy, who becomes known as Little Saint Hugh of Lincoln, is found dead, which is blamed on the Jews, leading to the imprisonment of 90 and hanging of 18 in the Tower of London.
- 1266 – "The Disinherited", a band of rebel barons from the Isle of Axholme attack the city and burn the account books of the Jews.
- 1269 – Carmelites arrive in Lincoln.
- 1280 – Angel Choir of Cathedral consecrated.
- 1284 – Cathedral Close walled under royal licence.
- 1290 – 28 November: Eleanor of Castile dies nearby, her viscera are buried in the cathedral and her funeral procession sets out from here for London.
- 1291 – Lincoln becomes a town of the Staple; this moves in 1369 to Boston.
- 1301 – 20 January: Parliament meets in Lincoln to consider papal claims to sovereignty of Scotland, which it rejects.
- 1311 – Central tower and spire of the Cathedral completed.
- 1312 – King Edward II holds a parliament in Lincoln, repeated in 1315, 1316 & 1318.
- 1327 – Edward II holds a parliament in Lincoln, the last in the city.
- 1341 – 10 August: King Edward III holds a Privy Council meeting in Lincoln.
- 1349 – The Black Death devastates Lincoln.
- 1370–1400 – Cathedral west towers and spires erected.
- 1386 – King Richard II presents the city with a sword of state.
- 1390 – Richard II orders the building of a new south gate which becomes the Stonebow.
- 1409 – City chartered as a county corporate.
- c. 1520 – Guildhall and Stonebow completed.
- 1538 – Dissolution of the Monasteries: King Henry VIII closes the friaries.
- 1540 – Lincoln granted city status.
- 1549 – Central spire of Lincoln Cathedral blown down in a storm.
- 1563 – William Byrd appointed organist and master of the choristers at the Lincoln Cathedral, his first professional appointment.
- 1584 – Lincoln Grammar School formed by merger of Lincoln City Free School and the Lincoln Chapter Grammar School.
- 1617, 29 March to 5 April – King James I visits.
- 1643, July – English Civil War: Parliamentary army abandons Lincoln; it is subsequently occupied by the Royalists until October.
- 1644, March – Civil War: Parliamentary army again abandons Lincoln, returning in May and recapturing it.
- 1648 – Civil War: Parliamentary defenders taking refuge in the Bishop's palace are forced to surrender by the Royalists.
- 1671–1672 – City authorised to improve navigation between the Trent and Boston: work is done on the Foss Dyke, wharves on Brayford Pool and on the Witham through High Bridge.
- 1674 – New Lincoln Cathedral Library designed by Christopher Wren for Dean Honywood begun.
- 1695 – Lincoln is granted an additional annual fair.

== 18th century onwards ==
- 1732 – A theatre is built.
- 1744
  - Assembly Rooms are built (in Drury Lane).
  - Foss Dyke navigation deepened.
- 1755, 1 August – Earthquake of around 4.2 M_{L}.
- 1756 – Turnpike trusts established around Lincoln.
- 1762, 18 August – Witham Navigation Commissioners (appointed 2 June) first meet.
- 1764 – First Theatre Royal built.
- 1769 – Hospital for the sick poor established.
- 1771
  - Horse racing on the West Common begins.
  - Approximate date: First Stamp End lock on the Witham built.
- 1776 – Lincoln County Hospital moves to new premises.
- 1780 – John Wesley first preaches in Lincoln.
- 1784 – First newspaper published in Lincoln (briefly).
- 1786 – New Road (modern-day Lindum Road) opened.
- 1795 – Deepening of Witham under High Bridge completed.
- 1799 – First post-Reformation Roman Catholic church built.

== 19th century ==
- 1809 – City gaol and Sessions House completed.
- 1816 – March: First steamboat launched on River Witham.
- 1820 – April: The Lawn is opened as a lunatic asylum.
- 1828 – 9 May: Acts for
  - "Paving, lighting, watching, and improving the City of Lincoln… and for regulating the Police therein", appointing Commissioners.
  - "Lighting with Gas the City of Lincoln", incorporating Lincoln Gas Light and Coke Co.
- 1840 – Ruston (engine builder) originates as Proctor and Burton, millwrights and engineers.
- 1846
  - 4 August: The Midland Railway opens its Nottingham to Lincoln Line to Lincoln St. Marks railway station, the first in the city.
  - Lincoln Waterworks Company established.
- 1847–1850 – St Anne's bede houses, designed by Augustus Pugin for Rev. Richard Sibthorp, are built.
- 1848
  - 17 October: The Great Northern Railway & Lincoln Central railway station open.
  - Corn Exchange built.
- 1857 – "Old barracks" built for the Royal North Lincoln Militia in Burton Road.
- 1861 – September: Lincoln Co-operative Society begins trading.
- 1862 – Bishop Grosseteste University established as the Diocesan Training School for Mistresses.
- 1863 – 2 February: Lincoln College of Art opens.
- 1872
  - June: HM Prison Lincoln opened.
  - The Arboretum, the city's first public park, is laid out on the former Monks Leys commons.
- 1876 – Municipal sewerage system commenced.
- 1878 – Lincoln County Hospital moves to its modern-day site.
- 1882 – 8 September: Lincoln Tramways Company commences a horse-drawn service.
- 1884 – 4 October: Lincoln City F.C., founded as an amateur Association football club, play their first match, at John O'Gaunts, winning 9–1 against Sleaford.
- 1890
  - "New barracks" built.
  - Lincoln Drill Hall opened.
- 1892 – 26 November: Explosion and fire destroy 1806 Theatre Royal.
- 1893 – Lincolnshire Echo first published.
- 1894 – The first public library opens.
- 1898 – The first electricity generating station is built.

== 20th century ==
- 1901 – Population: 48,784.
- 1904 – November–August 1905: Typhoid fever epidemic kills 130.
- 1905 – 23 November: Lincoln Corporation Tramways commences an electric service, initially using a stud contact system.
- 1911 – Westgate Water Tower built.
- 1915 – 6 September: Little Willie, the prototype military tank developed by William Foster & Co., is first tested by the British Army.
- 1916 – 16 September: Zeppelins targeting Lincoln drop bombs on Washingborough.
- 1919 – 3 February: Éamon de Valera and two other prisoners escape from Lincoln Prison.
- 1927 – 25 May: Usher Gallery (based on the collection left to the city by local watchmaker James Ward Usher (1845–1921)) is opened.
- 1929 – 31 December: Lincoln Corporation Tramways ceases operation, being replaced by motor buses.
- 1931 – 1 September: Ruston (engine builder) despatch their first internal-combustion industrial railway locomotive from the Anchor works (a narrow-gauge petrol-engined example); 6,481 will be built (mainly at Boultham Works) until the last is despatched on 19 February 1969.
- 1932 – Lincoln Technical College founded.
- World War II – 11 people are killed by German bombing.
- 1958 – 27 June: Pelham Bridge is opened.
- 1961 – 27 January: Last execution at HM Prison Lincoln.
- 1968 – Lincoln Crematorium is opened.
- 1969 – 29 July: Museum of Lincolnshire Life opens in former Burton Road barracks.
- 1972 – Last commercial (grain) traffic on Foss Dyke navigation.
- 1973 – City Hall is built.
- 1974
  - 1 April: City incorporated under terms of Local Government Act 1974.
  - Lincoln Christ's Hospital School formed by merger of Lincoln Grammar School, Christ's Hospital Girls' High School and St Giles's and Myle Cross secondary modern schools.
- 1991 – Waterside Shopping Centre opens.
- 1993 – Lincoln City Transport bus operations are absorbed by those of Lincolnshire Road Car Co.
- 1996
  - September: The newly renamed University of Lincolnshire and Humberside opens to students at Lincoln.
  - Lincoln Minster School formed with the amalgamation of four schools.

== 21st century ==
- 2001 – October: University of Lincoln adopts this name, moving its main campus from Hull to Brayford Pool at Lincoln in 2002.
- 2005 – October: The Collection opened.
- 2007 – 11th August: Siren Radio (Siren_FM) starts broadcasting community radio
- 2012 – 3 December: Bishop Grosseteste University granted full university status.
- 2017 – 18 February: Lincoln City F.C. reach the quarter finals of the FA Cup (Burnley 0–1 Lincoln City), the first time a non-league club has progressed to the last eight since 1914.

== Births ==
- 1560 – William Fulbecke, lawyer (d. c.1603)
- 1670 – 26 February: John Morley (Rector of Lincoln College, Oxford) (d. 1731)
- 1757 – 25 July: Frances King (philanthropist) (d. 1821)
- 1786 – 3 June: William Hilton (painter) (d. 1839)
- 1794 – 11 December: Robert Willson (bishop) (d. 1866)
- 1815 – 2 November: George Boole, mathematician (d. 1864)
- 1846 – 20 February: James Hall (historian) (d. 1914)
- 1899 – 15 September: Sir Francis Hill, solicitor, local historian and public figure (d. 1980)
- 1901 – 13 July: Reginald Goodall, orchestral conductor (d. 1990)
- 1916 – 17 December: Penelope Fitzgerald, née Knox, novelist and biographer (d. 2000)
- 1921 – 1 April: Steve Race, popular musician (d. 2009)
- 1923 – 2 March: Sam Scorer, architect (d. 2003)
- 1924 – 15 April: Neville Marriner, orchestral conductor (d. 2016)
- 1928 – 15 October: Keith Fordyce, broadcast presenter (d. 2011)
- 1942 – 23 April: Sheila Gish, actress (d. 2005)
- 1949 – 25 April: James Fenton, poet

== See also ==
- Timelines of other cities in East Midlands: Derby, Leicester, Nottingham

== Bibliography ==
- "Lincoln" . Encyclopædia Britannica. Vol. 16 (11th ed.). 1910. pp. 710–712.
