= Grade I listed buildings in Lincoln =

There are over 9,000 Grade I listed buildings in England. This page is a list of these buildings in the district of Lincoln in Lincolnshire.

== Lincoln ==
Name	Location	Type	Completed (Note: The date given is the date used by Historic England as significant for the initial building or that of an important part in the structure's description.)	Date designated	Grid ref. (Note: The grid reference is based on the British national grid reference system, sometimes known as OSGB36, used by the Ordnance Survey.) Geo-coordinates	Entry number (Note: The "List Entry Number" is a unique number assigned to each listed building and scheduled monument by Historic England.)	Image
Atherstone Place	Lincoln	House	Late 13th century	8 October 1953	SK9778171948; 53°14′08″N 0°32′11″W	1388519	Upload Photo
Base of North Gate Bastion	Lincoln	Gate	Roman	1 September 1968	SK9764572125; 53°14′14″N 0°32′18″W	1388462	Base of North Gate Bastion
Base of Roman Wall Turret	Lincoln	Tower	C2	2 October 1969	SK9773072120; 53°14′14″N 0°32′14″W	1388512	Upload Photo
Bishops Palace (remains)	Lincoln	Palace	1186-1224	8 October 1953	SK9778671662; 53°13′59″N 0°32′11″W	1388677	Bishops Palace (remains) More images
Cantilupe Chantry South	Lincoln	House	c1843-1845	8 October 1953	SK9784371738; 53°14′01″N 0°32′08″W	1388662	Cantilupe Chantry South More images
Cathedral Church of St Mary and Cloisters and Chapter House and Libraries	Lincoln	Cathedral	1311	8 October 1953	SK9779671808; 53°14′04″N 0°32′11″W	1388680	Cathedral Church of St Mary and Cloisters and Chapter House and Libraries More images
Church of All Saints, Bracebridge	Bracebridge, Lincoln	Church	11th century	8 October 1953	SK9681667902; 53°11′58″N 0°33′08″W	1388470	Church of All Saints, Bracebridge More images
Church of St Mary Le Wigford	Lincoln	Church	11th century	8 October 1953	SK9749570949; 53°13′36″N 0°32′28″W	1388597	Church of St Mary Le Wigford More images
Church of St Peter at Gowts	Lincoln	Church	11th century	8 October 1953	SK9732070401; 53°13′18″N 0°32′38″W	1388599	Church of St Peter at Gowts More images
Close Wall and Tower in the Garden of No 10 and No 2, Minster Yard and No 25, Eastgate.	Lincoln	Wall and Tower	1316-1321	8 October 1953	SK9798871853; 53°14′05″N 0°32′00″W	1388535	Upload Photo
Close Wall between Number 16a Minster Yard and the Deanery	Lincoln	Wall	1316-1321	2 October 1969	SK9778571749; 53°14′02″N 0°32′11″W	1388665	Close Wall between Number 16a Minster Yard and the Deanery
Close Wall to South and West of Edward King House	Lincoln	Wall	Late 13th century	8 July 1991	SK9773771649; 53°13′58″N 0°32′14″W	1388682	Close Wall to South and West of Edward King House
Close Wall to South and West of the Deanery	Lincoln	Wall	1285	8 October 1953	SK9768771754; 53°14′02″N 0°32′17″W	1388666	Close Wall to South and West of the Deanery
Colonia Wall and Lower West Gate	Lincoln	Gate	Roman	8 July 1991	SK9733271449; 53°13′52″N 0°32′36″W	1388731	Colonia Wall and Lower West Gate More images
Exchequergate	Lincoln	Gatehouse	Mid 14th century	8 October 1953	SK9767771803; 53°14′03″N 0°32′17″W	1388541	Exchequergate More images
Gatehouse and Gateway Tower to Vicars' Court	Lincoln	College of the Vicars Choral	1363-1397	8 October 1953	SK9786671728; 53°14′01″N 0°32′07″W	1388649	Gatehouse and Gateway Tower to Vicars' Court More images
Greestone Steps and Arch with adjoining Close Wall to West	Lincoln	Cathedral Close	Late 12th century	8 October 1953	SK9793471626; 53°13′58″N 0°32′03″W	1388552	Greestone Steps and Arch with adjoining Close Wall to West More images
Greyfriars' Museum	Lincoln	Mechanics Institute	1883	8 October 1953	SK9775971248; 53°13′45″N 0°32′13″W	1388472	Greyfriars' Museum More images
High Bridge	Lincoln	House	16th century	8 October 1953	SK9750571160; 53°13′43″N 0°32′27″W	1388574	High Bridge More images
Jew's Court	Lincoln	House	c. 1170	8 October 1953	SK9763771576; 53°13′56″N 0°32′19″W	1388769	Jew's Court More images
Jew's House	Lincoln	House	c. 1170	8 October 1953	SK9763371566; 53°13′56″N 0°32′20″W	1388810	Jew's House More images
Lincoln Castle	Lincoln	Castle	1068	15 August 1973	SK9763271871; 53°14′06″N 0°32′19″W	1388491	Lincoln Castle More images
Mint Wall	Lincoln	Wall	c100	8 October 1953	SK9758972004; 53°14′10″N 0°32′22″W	1388829	Mint Wall More images
Number 52 and adjoining Newport Arch	Lincoln	Gate	3rd century	8 October 1953	SK9767072132; 53°14′14″N 0°32′17″W	1388450	Number 52 and adjoining Newport Arch More images
Outer East Gateway to Bishops Palace	Lincoln	Bishops Palace	c. 1500	8 October 1953	SK9785471734; 53°14′01″N 0°32′08″W	1388679	Upload Photo
Pottergate Arch	Lincoln	Gate	Mid 14th century	8 July 1991	SK9802271693; 53°14′00″N 0°31′59″W	1388738	Pottergate Arch More images
Remains of North Tower of Roman East Gate	Lincoln	Walls	Roman	2 October 1969	SK9784171933; 53°14′08″N 0°32′08″W	1388538	Remains of North Tower of Roman East Gate More images
Roman Wall between Eastgate and North Wing of Eastgate Hotel	Lincoln	Walls	Roman	2 October 1969	SK9785372000; 53°14′10″N 0°32′07″W	1388513	Upload Photo
Roman Well and Part of Forum Wall	Lincoln	Forum	C1	8 July 1991	SK9762871958; 53°14′08″N 0°32′19″W	1388460	Roman Well and Part of Forum Wall
Ruined Building and adjoining Section of Close Wall to the North	Lincoln	Walls	Late C2	8 October 1953	SK9781471641; 53°13′58″N 0°32′10″W	1388802	Ruined Building and adjoining Section of Close Wall to the North
Section of Roman Wall	Lincoln	Wall	Roman	2 October 1969	SK9775172121; 53°14′14″N 0°32′13″W	1388514	Section of Roman Wall
St Mary's Guildhall	Lincoln	Town House	c. 1157	8 October 1953	SK9731270454; 53°13′20″N 0°32′38″W	1388604	St Mary's Guildhall More images
St Marys School, Pottergate	Lincoln	House	14th century	8 October 1953	SK9798371758; 53°14′02″N 0°32′01″W	1388737	St Marys School, Pottergate More images
Stonebow and Guildhall	Lincoln	Guildhall	Late 15th century and early 16th century	8 October 1953	SK9752671237; 53°13′45″N 0°32′26″W	1388605	Stonebow and Guildhall More images
The Bishop's House	Lincoln	Bishops House	13th century	8 October 1953	SK9780071953; 53°14′08″N 0°32′10″W	1388520	The Bishop's House More images
The Chancery	Lincoln	Chancery	13th century	8 October 1953	SK9796071795; 53°14′03″N 0°32′02″W	1380559	The Chancery More images
The Deanery and Paley Flats and adjoining Outbuildings and Stables	Lincoln	Deanery	13th century	8 October 1953	SK9770571765; 53°14′02″N 0°32′16″W	1388664	The Deanery and Paley Flats and adjoining Outbuildings and Stables More images
The Priory and attached Section of Close Wall	Lincoln	Hall House	13th century	8 October 1953	SK9795071892; 53°14′06″N 0°32′02″W	1388650	Upload Photo
Tower and Sections of Close Wall bordering grounds of Number 5 Pottergate	Lincoln	Tower	1285-1327	8 October 1953	SK9807571830; 53°14′04″N 0°31′56″W	1388831	Upload Photo
Vicars Court Nos 1, 2 and 2a	Lincoln	House	14th century	8 October 1953	SK9787371703; 53°14′00″N 0°32′07″W	1388684	Vicars Court Nos 1, 2 and 2a More images
Vicars Court nos 4 and 4a and attached Wall to South	Lincoln	House	14th century	8 October 1953	SK9783471716; 53°14′01″N 0°32′09″W	1388686	Vicars Court nos 4 and 4a and attached Wall to South
Vicars Court nos 3 and 3a and Priests Vicars Houses	Lincoln	House	c. 1309	8 October 1953	SK9784671675; 53°13′59″N 0°32′08″W	1388685	Vicars Court nos 3 and 3a and Priests Vicars Houses
No 46 and 47 Steep Hill and 1 Christ Hospital Terrace	Lincoln	House	c. 1170	8 October 1953	SK9764371732; 53°14′01″N 0°32′19″W	1388795	No 46 and 47 Steep Hill and 1 Christ Hospital Terrace More images

== See also ==
- Grade II* listed buildings in Lincoln
