= Society for Lincolnshire History and Archaeology =

Organisation in UK

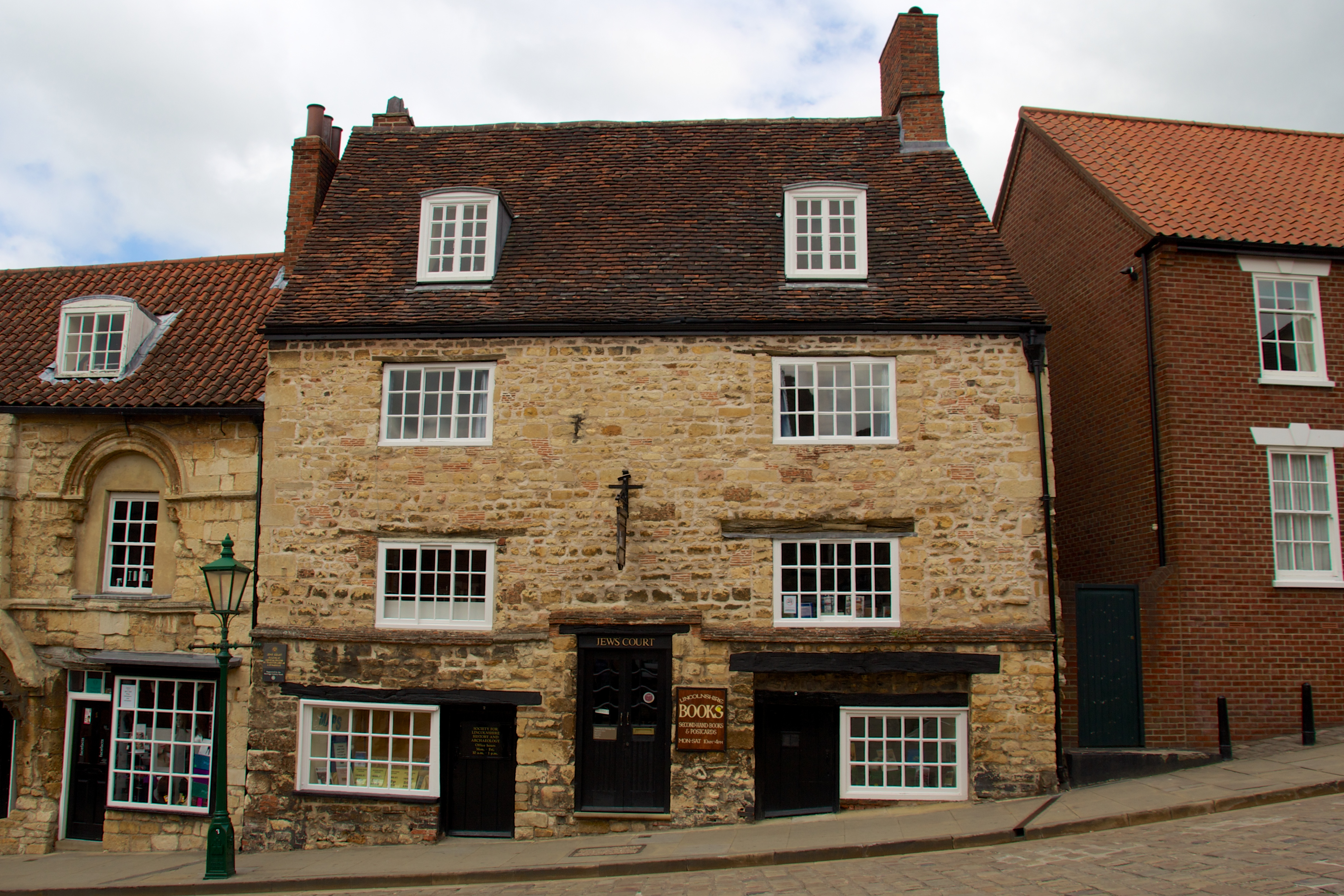
- Jews' Court, Lincoln
- Formation: 1974
- Type: Learned society
- Purpose: The study of the archaeology, history and culture of Lincolnshire.
- Location: Jews' Court, Lincoln
- Members: c700
- Activities: Research & Publications, Study Tours and Conferences, Grant-giving, Educational Awards and Prizes.
- Website: slha.org.uk

The Society for Lincolnshire History and Archaeology or SLHA aims to create a greater awareness of the history of Lincolnshire, and works to discover and record its heritage. In its present form, the society came into being in 1974, but it has antecedents dating back to 1844.

== Activities and branches ==
The society's activities include arranging lectures and other events about Lincolnshire's history and archaeology, and the publication of a journal, a newsletter and books about Lincolnshire. The society has its headquarters at the Jews' Court in Lincoln, where it has a lecture room, and runs a bookshop for new and secondhand books. It has two branch groups, the Sleaford History Group and the South Holland History Group at Spalding, and also works with other local groups throughout the historic county of Lincolnshire.

== Earlier societies ==
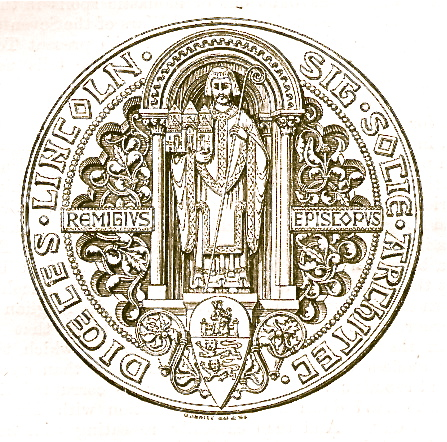
Seal of the Lincolnshire Diocesan Architectural Society engraved by Orlando Jewitt

The Lincolnshire Topographical Society was established in 1840 under the patronage of Lord Monson. Among its members were the architects Edward James Willson and William Adams Nicholson. It only published one volume of proceedings and appears to have been defunct by 1843.

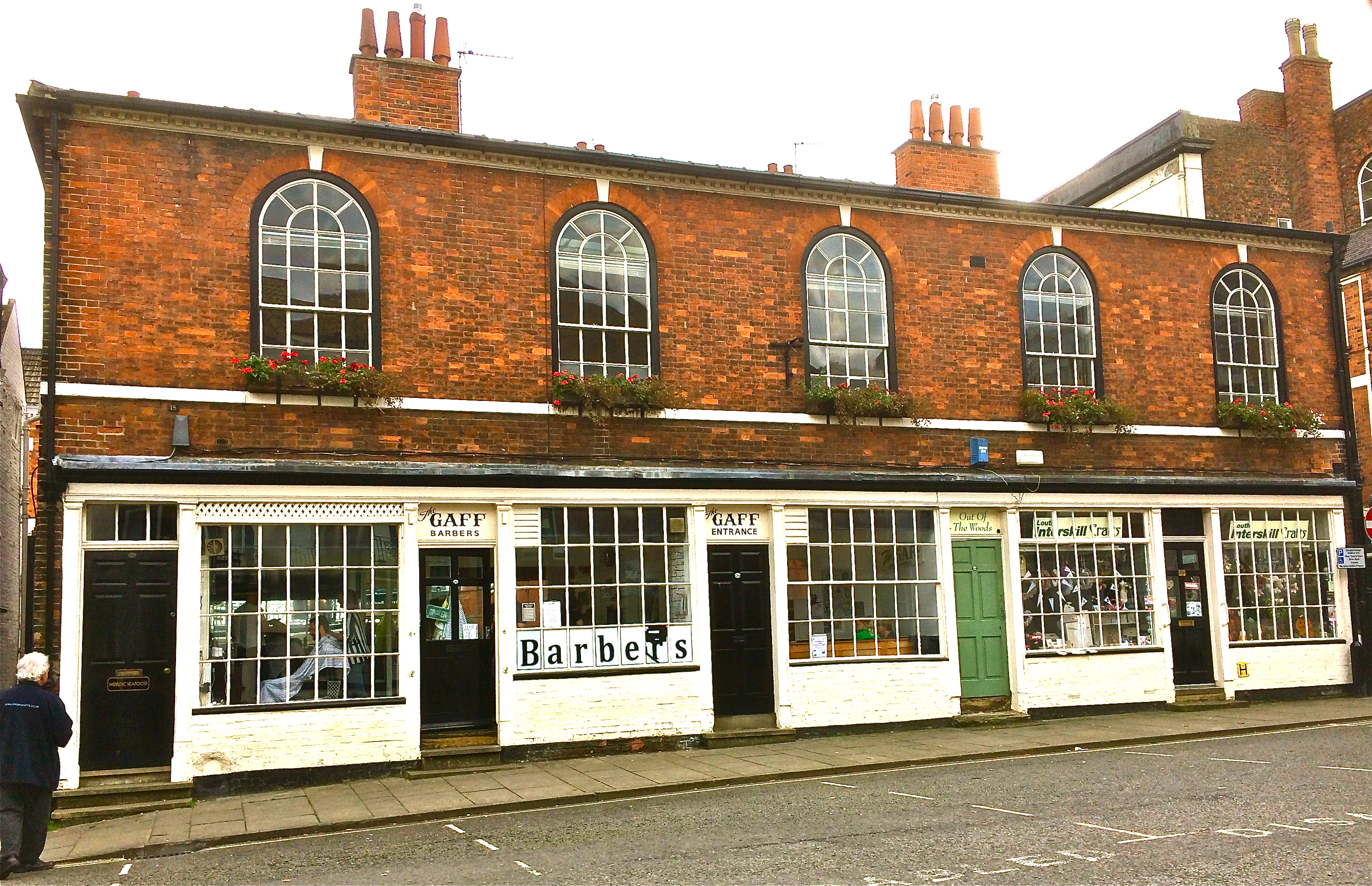
Albion Rooms, Louth

In 1844 the Lincolnshire Society for the encouragement of Ecclesiastical Antiquities was founded in Louth. The first meeting was held in the Albion Rooms in the Cornmarket on 21 November 1844. Meetings were held monthly and membership was by election. Initially this was limited to members of the Anglican church. This is probably the reason why Edward James Willson, a Roman Catholic, did not join this society. In 1849 the society changed its name to the Lincolnshire Architectural Society and then in 1853 to the Lincolnshire Diocesan Architectural Society. White's Directory for Lincolnshire noted in 1856 that the "Lincolnshire Diocesan Architectural Society has an interesting collection of curiosities, drawings etc. in the Louth Corn Exchange [opposite the Albion Rooms], but that it was proposed to move it to Lincoln". Archdeacon Edward Trollope was appointed as secretary of the society in 1850 and it was probably on his initiative that the society moved to Lincoln and started to publish its proceedings in the Reports and Papers of the Associated Archaeological Societies. A further name change occurred in 1885 when it became the Lincolnshire and Nottinghamshire Architectural and Archaeological Society. This was to reflect the removal of the Archdeaconry of Nottingham from the Diocese of Lincoln and the creation of the new Diocese of Southwell. In 1902 Nottinghamshire was dropped from the title. During these early years a high proportion of the members of the society were clergymen within the Diocese of Lincoln and most of the published articles are about Church history and architecture.

While the Lincolnshire Architectural and Archaeological Society continued to publish its papers with the Associated Archaeological Societies until 1936, other developments were taking place. In 1930 the Lindsey Local History Society was founded and it came to publish the Lincolnshire Historian. In 1945 the Lincoln Archaeological Research Committee was founded and this started to conduct a series of notable excavation both in the City of Lincoln and in the county. The Lincolnshire Architectural and Archaeological Society merged with the Lindsey Local History Society in 1965 and in 1974 the society for Lincolnshire History and Archaeology was created by a further mergers with the Lincoln Archaeological Research Committee. and the Lincolnshire Industrial Archaeology Group. In 2009 Flare, an organisation that supported the Lincoln Archaeological Trust became a constituent member of the society.

== Lincolnshire History & Archaeology ==
The society publishes a journal, Lincolnshire History & Archaeology. The first volume was published in 1966. The contents of all journals are available on the SLHA's website; many of its articles are available in digital form.

== See also ==
- Lincoln Record Society
- List of Antiquarian Societies

== Bibliography ==
- Leach, Terence R. (1992). "Edward Trollope and the Lincoln Diocesan Architectural Society". In Sturman, Christopher (ed.). Some Historians of Lincolnshire. Occasional Papers in Lincolnshire History and Archaeology. Vol. 9. Lincoln: Society for Lincolnshire History and Archaeology. ISBN 0904680983.
