= The Old Deanery, Lincoln =

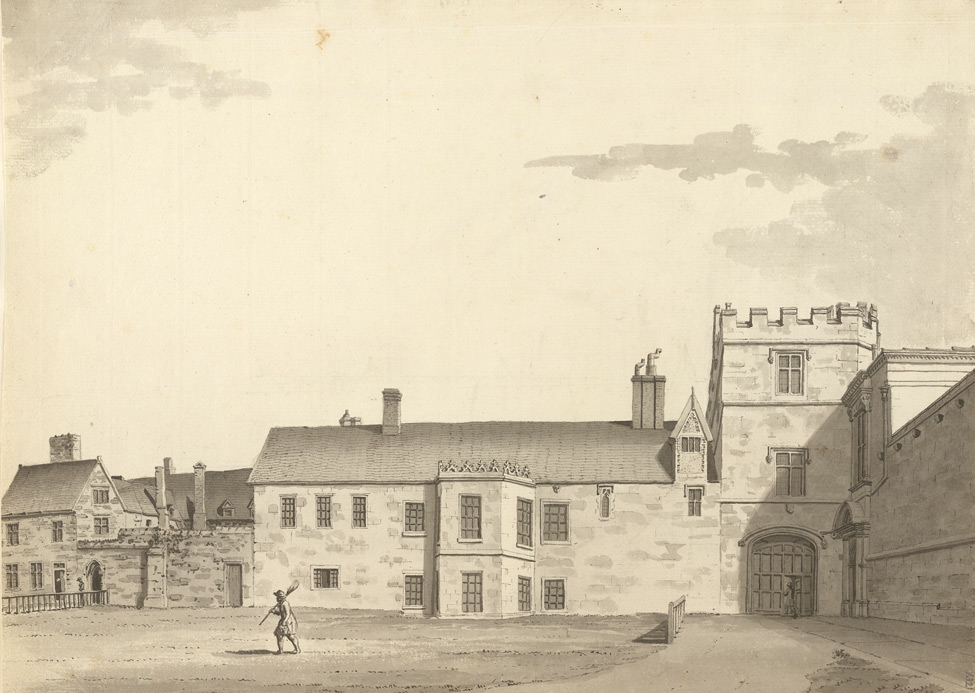
- Deanery at Lincoln drawn by Samuel Hieronymus Grimm in 1784.

- Location in Lincolnshire
- 53.214598°N 0.543955°W
- Location: N. W. Lincoln Cathedral

History
- Founded: 1254
- Demolished: After 1544

The Old Deanery, Lincoln was the official residence of the Dean of Lincoln. It was a spacious building set around a courtyard. The Deanery is thought to have been started in 1254 by Richard de Gravesend, who became Dean in that year and Bishop of Lincoln four years later. The hall stood on the north side of the court. The great kitchen, the buttery and other offices stood in the same range of buildings. They were extensively damaged during the English Civil War and rebuilt after 1660. The southern entrance tower or Flemyng tower was built by Dr Robert Flemyng and his arms were on both the north and south fronts of the tower. The Deanery was pulled down in 1847 and replaced by the present building by William Burn. This was to become the Cathedral School and later the Minster School. In 2017 plans to convert the building into a visitor and education centre for Lincoln Cathedral were announced.

== The Works Chantry ==
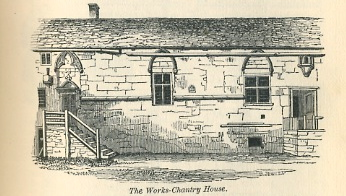
Works Chantry ?Ross

The Old Deanery was bounded on the west by the Works Chantry. This was a medieval building which housed a college of four priests who sang masses for the souls of benefactors who had made donations towards the fabric of Lincoln Cathedral. Most of the building, which stood round a courtyard, was demolished in the early part of the 19th. century to give a better view of the cathedral. Fragments of the chapel survive facing the Eastgate.

=== The Old Deanery, Lincoln, Gallery ===
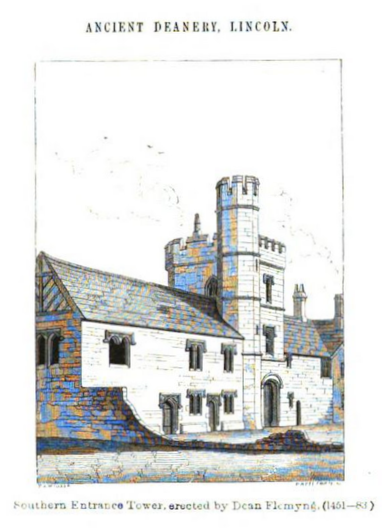
The Old Deanery Lincoln

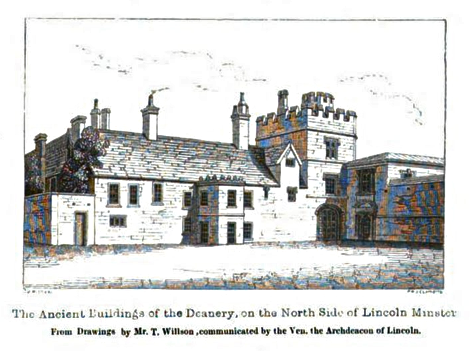
The Old Deanery Lincoln

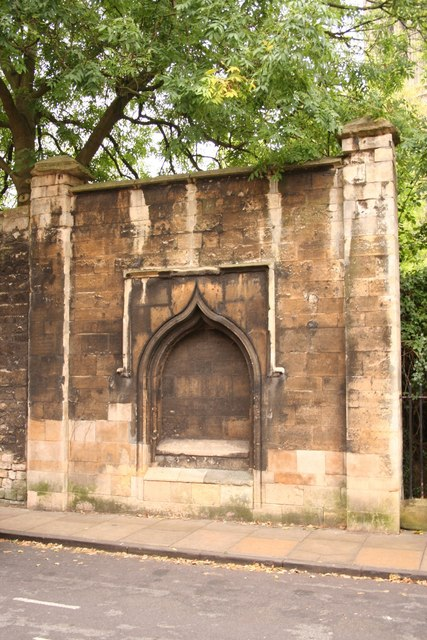
Works Chantry doorway

== See also: Other Residences in Lincoln Cathedral Close and Minster Yard ==
- Vicars' Court, Lincoln
- Lincoln Medieval Bishop's Palace

== Bibliography ==
- Anon (?Ross J.) (1864) Lincoln: Tracts and Miscellanies relating Lincoln Cathedral, Castle, Palace Ruins, Etc., with some original letters and curious documents hitherto Unpublished. Brookes and Vibert, Lincoln.
- Antram N (revised), Pevsner N & Harris J, (1989), The Buildings of England: Lincolnshire, Yale University Press.
- Willson E. J. (1848), Notices of the ancient deanery, Lincoln. Memoirs Illustrative of the History and Antiquities of the City and County of Lincoln. Archaeological Institute of Great Britain and Ireland. London. pg 291 – 3.
- Ketteringham J.R. (1999) The Old Deanery in A Third Lincolnshire Hotchpotch
