= Aaron of Lincoln =

English financier (c. 1123–1186)

- Born: c. 1123; Lincoln, England
- Died: 1186 (aged 62–63)
- Years active: c. 1166–86
- Era: Middle Ages
- Known for: Wealthiest man in Norman England

Aaron of Lincoln (c. 1123 – 1186) was an English Jewish financier. He is believed to have been the wealthiest man in Norman England; it is estimated that his wealth exceeded that of the King.

== Biography ==
Aaron was born around 1123 in Lincoln, England and likely spent some of his early life in France.

He is first mentioned in the English pipe-roll of 1166 as the creditor of King Henry II for sums amounting to £616 12s 8d in nine of the English counties. He conducted his business through agents, and sometimes in conjunction with Isaac, fil Joce; by these methods building up what was practically a great banking association that spread throughout England.

He owned a plot of land near to Lincoln Castle, and his house was likely situated on this land before it was demolished to make way for an extension to the castle defences in 1227–8.

It is recorded that Aaron died in 1186.

== Money lending ==
He made a specialty of money lending for the purpose of building abbeys and monasteries. Among those built were the Abbey of St Albans, Lincoln Minster, Peterborough Abbey, and no fewer than nine Cistercian abbeys. They were all founded between 1140 and 1152, and at Aaron's death remained indebted to him in no less a sum than 6,400 marks. Some of these debts may, however, have been incurred by the abbeys to acquire lands pledged to Aaron. Thus the abbot of Meaux took over from Aaron lands pledged to the latter in the sum of 1,800 marks; Aaron at the same time promising to commute the debt for a new one of only 1,260 marks, which was paid off by the abbey. After Aaron's death the original deed for 1,800 marks was brought to light, and the king's treasury demanded from the abbey the missing 540 marks. This incident indicates how, on the one hand, Aaron's activity enabled the abbeys to get possession of the lands belonging to the smaller barons, and, on the other, how his death brought the abbeys into the king's power.

Aaron not only advanced money on land, but also on corn, armour and houses, and in this way acquired an interest in properties scattered through the eastern and southern counties of England. Upon his death Henry II seized his property as the escheat of a Jewish usurer, and the English crown thus became universal heir to his estate. The actual cash treasure accumulated by Aaron was sent over to France to assist Henry in his war with Philip Augustus, but the vessel containing it went down on the voyage between Shoreham and Dieppe. However, the indebtedness of the smaller barons and knights remained, and fell into the hands of the king to the amount of £15,000, owed by some 430 persons distributed over the English counties.

His business operations were of an unprecedented scale, with his capital financing many of the great architectural projects of the Angevin period, including cathedrals and abbeys. So large was the amount that a separate division of the exchequer was constituted, entitled "Aaron's Exchequer" (Madox, History of the Exchequer, folio ed., p. 745), and was continued till at least 1201, that is, fifteen years after his death, for on the pipe-roll of that year most of the debts to Aaron (about £7,500) are recorded as still outstanding to the king, showing that only half the debts had been paid over by that time, though, on the death of Aaron, the payment of interest ceased automatically, since the king, as a Christian, could not accept usury.

== Massacre of Jews at York ==
In 1190, Richard de Malbis (Richard Malebisse), a debtor of Aaron of Lincoln, led an attack on the family of Aaron's late agent in York that resulted in a massacre of the entire Jewish community, some 150 men, women, and children, including Yom Tov of Joigny, at York Castle.

== Norman House ==
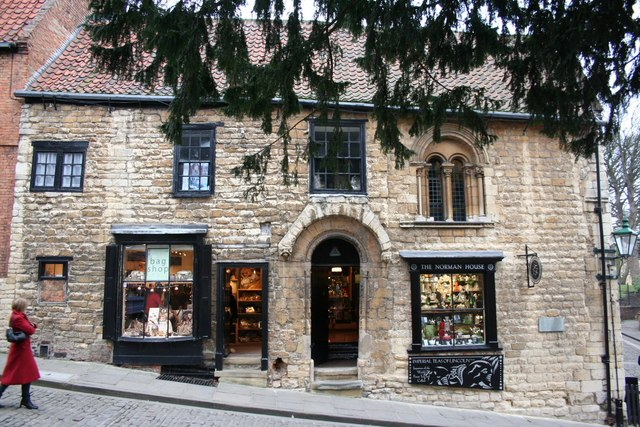
Norman House, Lincoln: frontage on Steep Hill

A house sometimes associated with Aaron of Lincoln still stands, also known as Norman House, and is probably the oldest private stone dwelling in England the date of which can be fixed with precision (before 1186). While the house is associated with a Jewish banker, and historically known as "Aaron the Jew's house", it is not known whether the house actually had any association with Aaron of Lincoln. Originally the house had no windows on the ground floor—an omission probably intended to increase the facilities for protection or defence.

== See also ==
- Exchequer of the Jews – the successor body to Aaron's Exchequer
