= Lincoln Medieval Bishop's Palace =

Ruined medieval complex in Lincoln, UK

Lincoln Bishop’s Palace
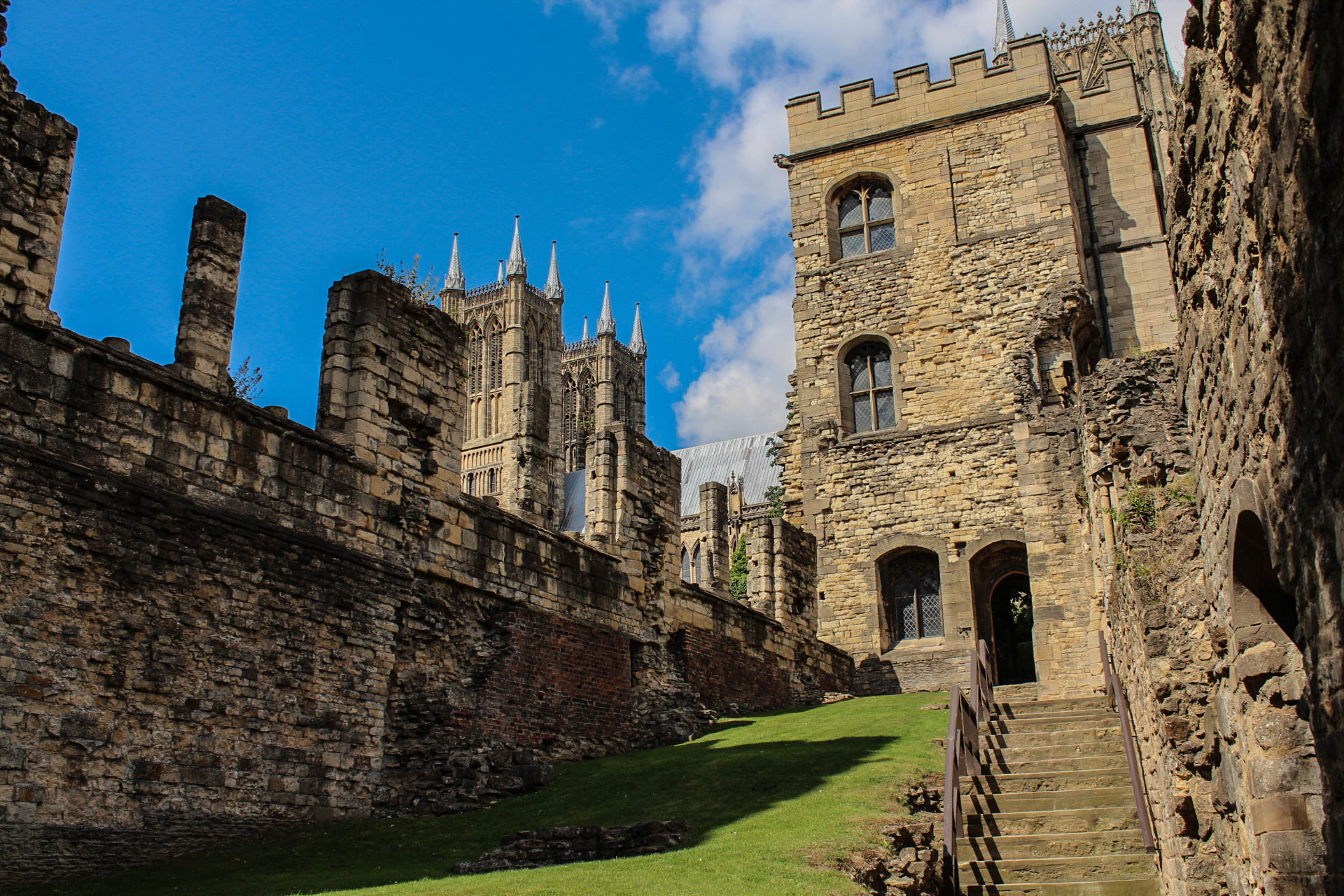
- Bishop’s Palace Lincoln, looking towards the Cathedral

- Location in Lincolnshire
- 53.2329°N 0.534689°W
- Location: Entrance from Minster Yard, S of Cathedral
- OS grid reference: SK9778671662

History
- Founded: c1175
- Demolished: Partially during English Civil War

Site notes
- Governing body: English Heritage

Listed Building – Grade I
- Official name: Bishops Palace (Remains)
- Designated: 8 October 1953
- Reference no.: 1388677

Scheduled monument
- Official name: The Old Palace
- Reference no.: 1005024

The Old Bishop's Palace is a historic visitor attraction in the city of Lincoln, Lincolnshire. When it was first built, in the late 12th century, it was at the centre of the vast Diocese of Lincoln, which stretched from the Humber to the Thames. The Palace was one of the most impressive buildings of medieval England, reflecting the power and wealth of Lincoln's bishops. It is situated on a hillside site, just below Lincoln Cathedral, providing extensive views over the city.

The site lies immediately to the south of the Roman wall which had become the medieval defensive wall of the Bail, which enclosed both Lincoln Castle and Lincoln Cathedral. The palace was damaged during the Civil War and subsequently largely abandoned. During the period that followed the Bishop's main residence was Buckden Palace in Huntingdonshire. In 1841, following the reduction in size of the Diocese of Lincoln, the Bishop moved to Riseholme, to the north of Lincoln. This proved inconvenient and Riseholme Hall was sold. In 1886 an older building on the western side of the Palace enclosure was substantially rebuilt and enlarged in a Tudor revival style by the architect Ewan Christian. A further change occurred in 1888 when the architects Bodley and Garner rebuilt and converted the southern portion of the medieval Great Hall into a chapel for the Bishop.

In 1945 it was decided that this Palace was too large and in 1948 the Bishop's residence was moved to Atherstone Place on the north side of the cathedral. The Victorian Bishop's palace subsequently became a Diocesan Retreat centre and since 2009 has been run as the Old Palace Hotel. The ruined parts of the Medieval Palace were placed in the guardianship of the Ministry of Works in 1954, and are now managed by English Heritage. A programme of restoration, excavation and interpretation has been carried out. A modern garden plan was laid out by Mark Anthony Walker, in 2001, and a vineyard re-established in 2012.

== History and architecture ==
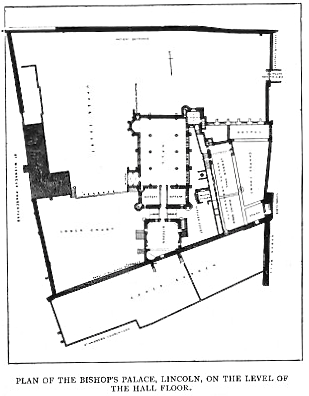
Plan of Bishop's Palace, Lincoln, by Edward James Willson, 1848

Research on the Bishop's Palace is very dependent on the work of Edward James Willson, who was surveyor to the Dean and Chapter of the Cathedral. Willson produced detailed surveys of the ruins as they stood in the 1840s and related them to architectural fragments from the site. From this Willson, together with his son Thomas who was also an architect, drawings were constructed to show how the palace had appeared in medieval times. Willson also made extensive use of documents in the Lincoln Cathedral Library and particularly the detailed survey of the Palace produced during English Civil War by the Parliamentary Commissioners in 1647. When taken in conjunction with the engraving made by Samuel Buck in 1726 of the Palace, a good idea can be formed as to the extent of destruction that occurred to the building during this period. Willson presented his findings to The Archaeological Institute of Britain and Ireland on the occasion of their visit to Lincoln in 1848.

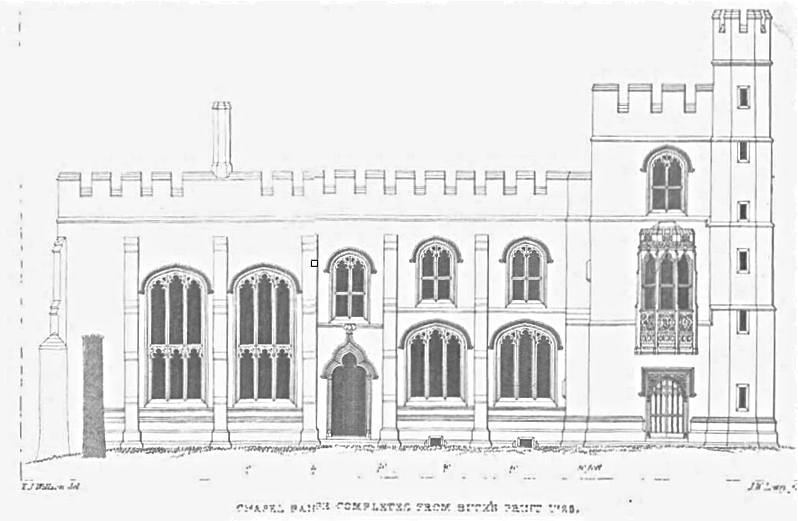
Old Bishop's Palace Lincoln as reconstructed by Willson from the Buck Panorama (right)

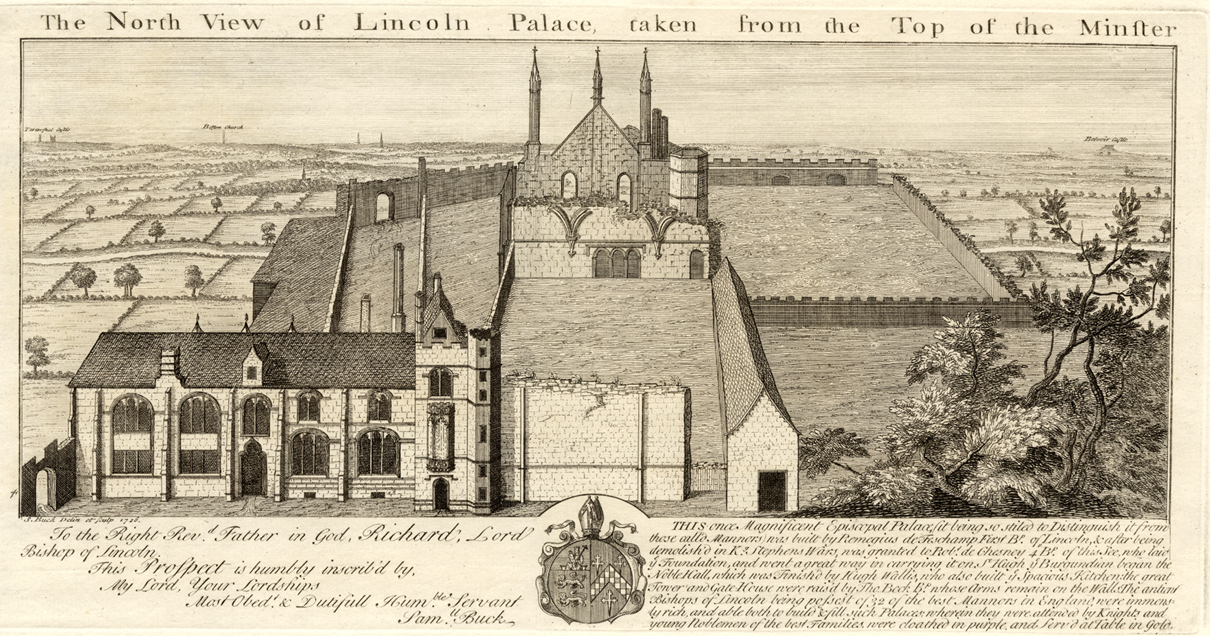
Bishop's Palace, Lincoln by Samuel Buck, 1726

=== Hieronymus Grimm drawings ===
In the 1780s the ruins of Bishop's Palace were recorded in some detail by Hieronymus Grimm, a Swiss artist working for Sir Richard Kaye, the Dean of Lincoln. These drawings show the Palace in an advanced state of decay, before the 19th-century restoration work had begun. These include the a view of the Alnwick tower with the oriel window lacking fenestration and without the present turrets and crenellation. Other views show the west side of the Great Hall and views from the south. One of these, looking towards the Cathedral, shows the house on the left, which was to be converted into the later Bishop's Palace in 1886.

== Drawings by Hieronymus Grimm of the Old Bishops’ Palace ==
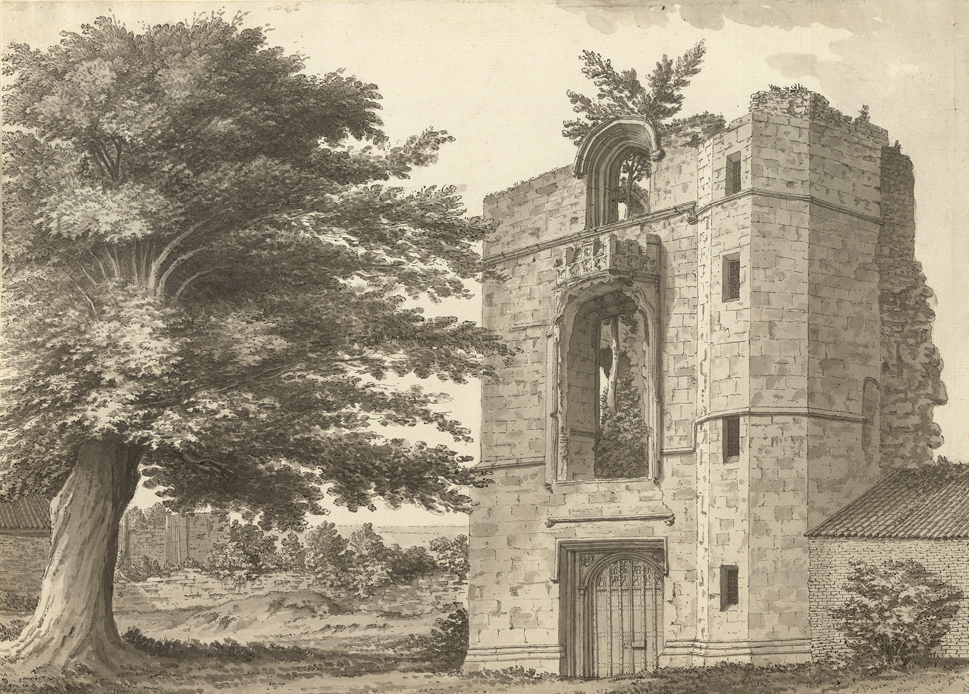
Alnwick Tower, Lincoln

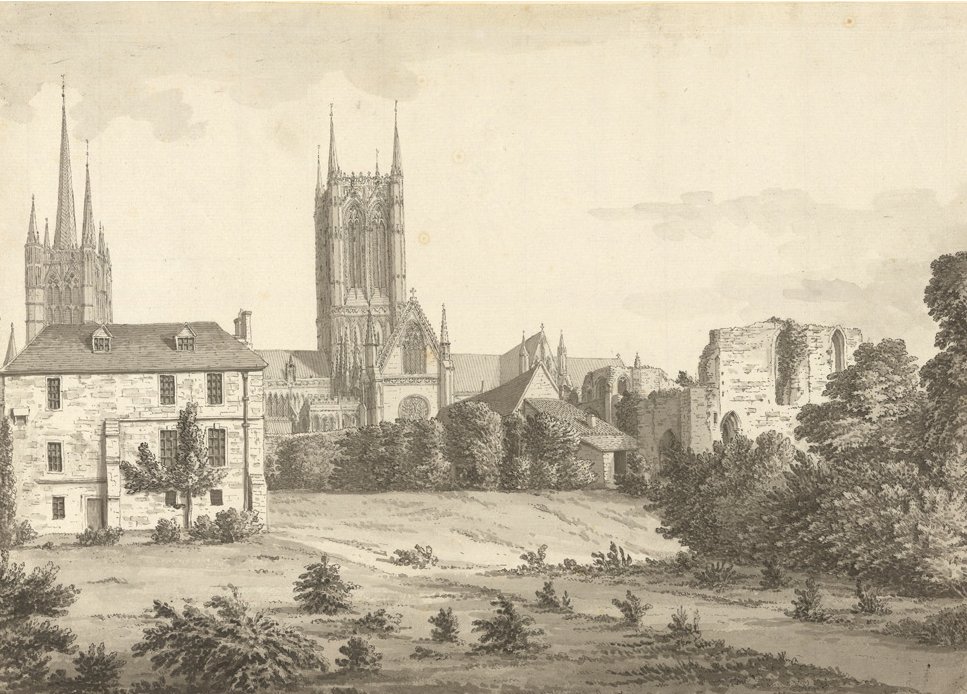
Old Bishops Palace, Lincoln

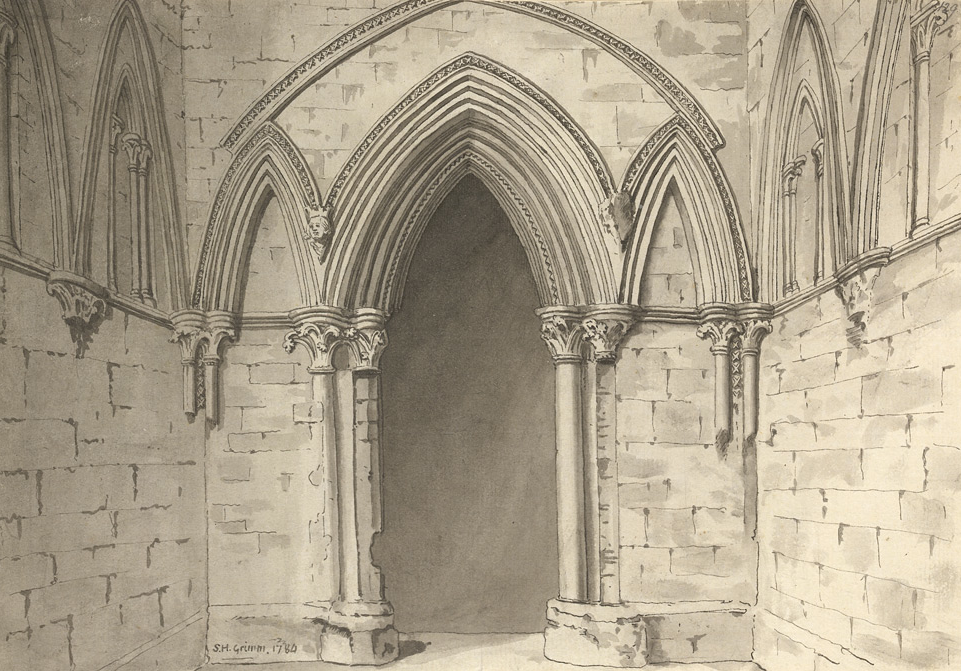
Bishops Palace, Lincoln

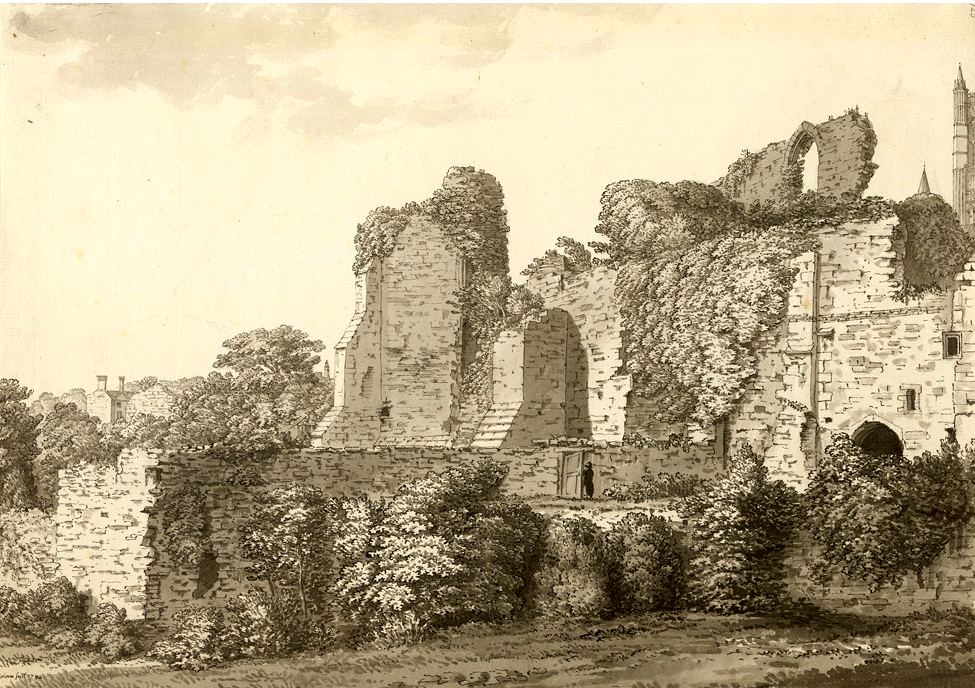
Ruins of Bishops Palace, Lincoln

=== The Layout of the Bishop’s Palace ===
The palace's most notable surviving feature is the East Hall, built over an undercroft by the Burgundian-born Bishop St Hugh of Lincoln and completed in the 1230s. The range of buildings that included an expanded chapel and the tower gatehouse were built by Bishop William Alnwick, (bishop 1436–1450) in the 1430s.

=== Bishops Palace Gallery ===
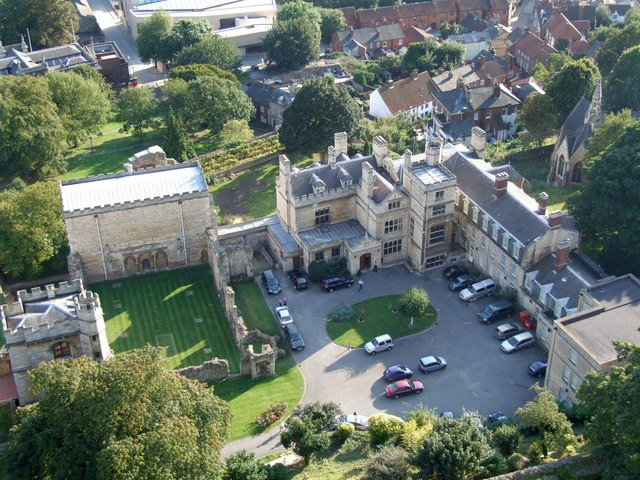
Chapel and Old Palace Hotel from the Cathedral tower

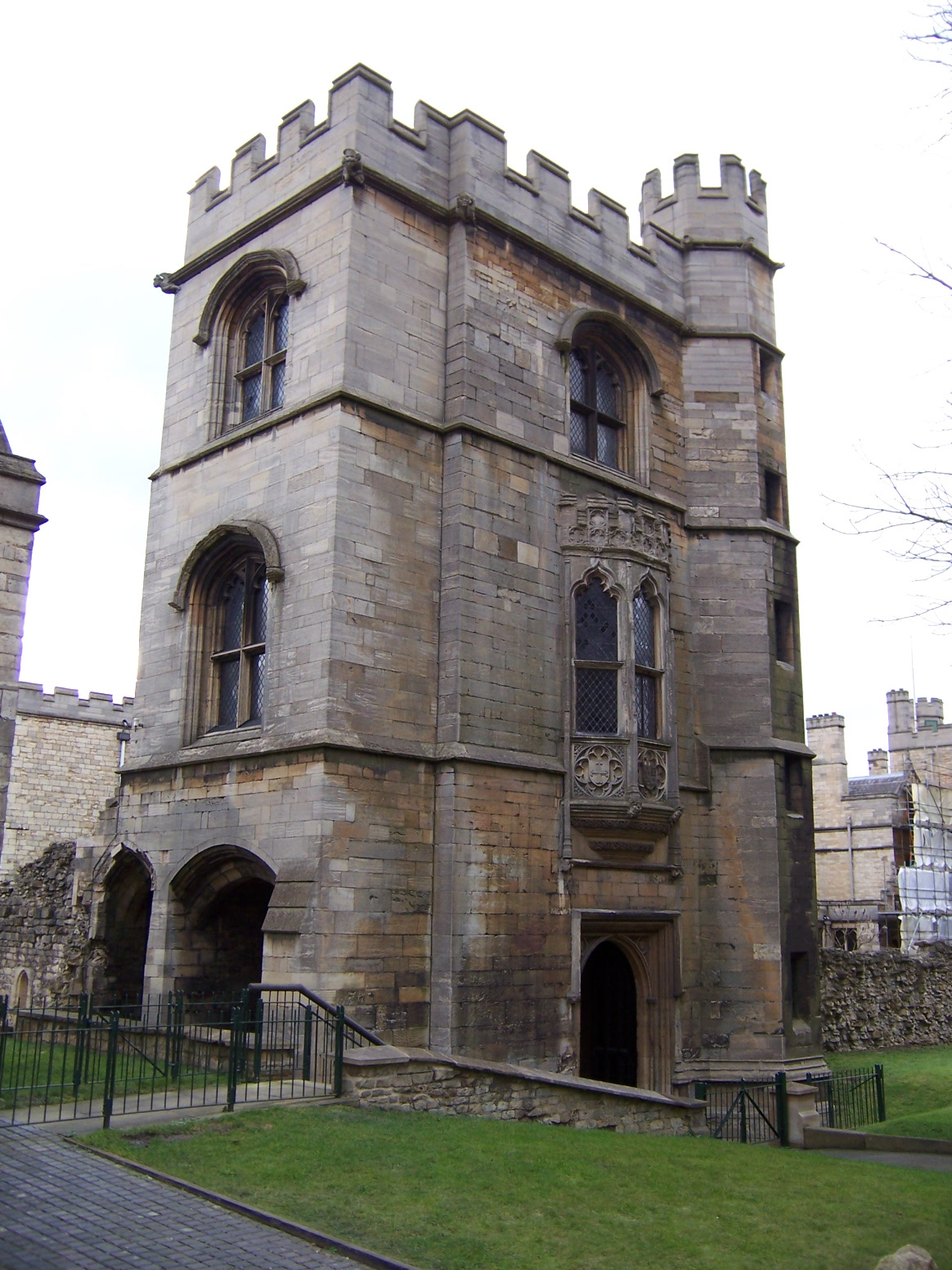
Alnwick's tower

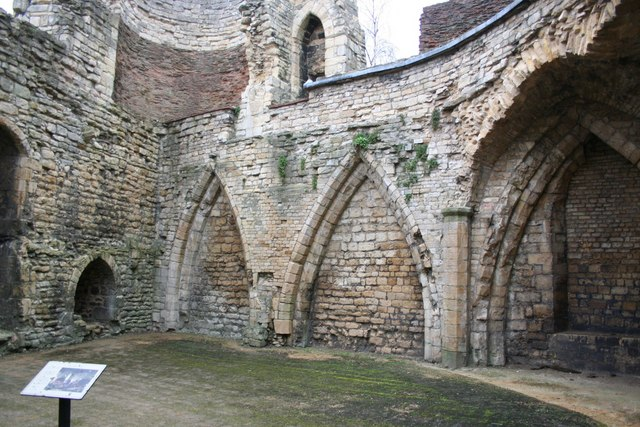
Medieval Kitchen -

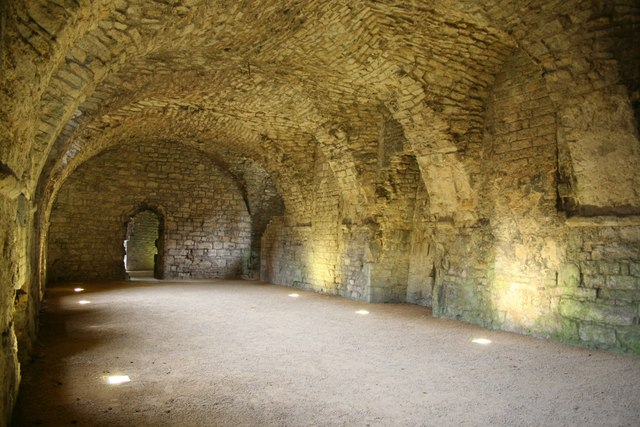
Undercroft

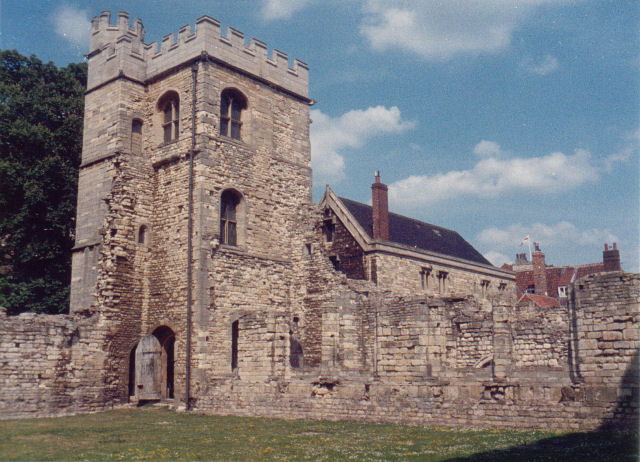
Medieval Bishops' Palace

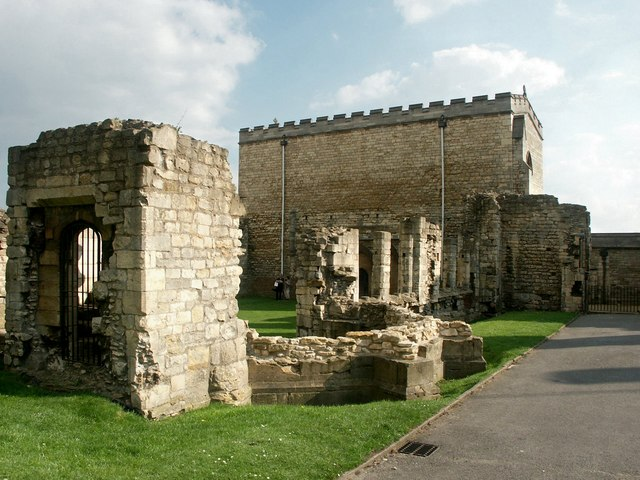
The Old Palace, Lincoln

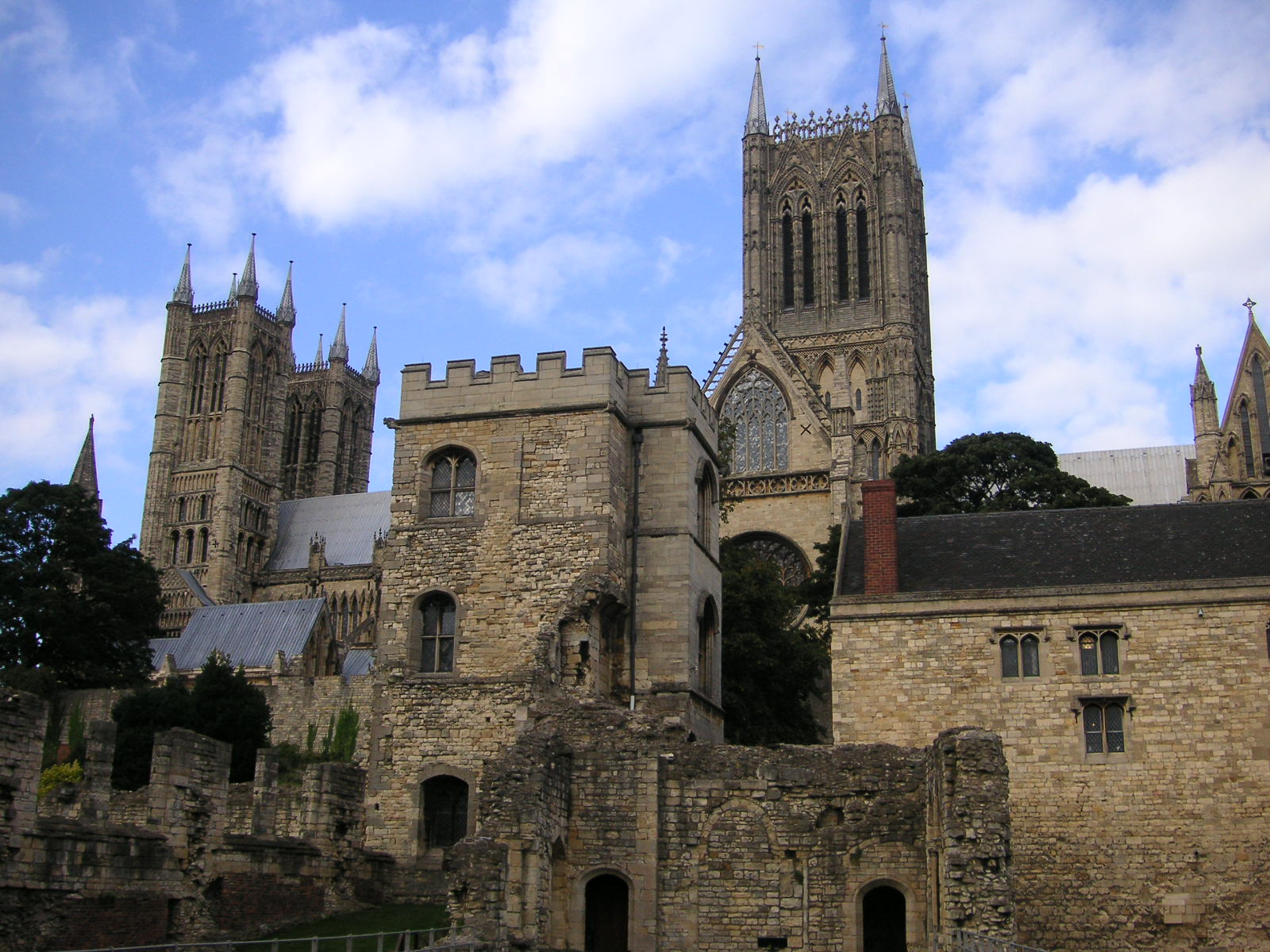
Lincoln Cathedral from the Palace [File:Old Bishop's Palace]

== See also: Other Residences in Lincoln Cathedral Close and Minster Yard ==
- Vicars' Court, Lincoln
- The Old Deanery, Lincoln

== See also: Other Palaces and Residences of the Bishop of Lincoln ==
- ?Biggleswade
- Buckden Palace
- Dorchester, Oxfordshire
- Fingest, Buckinghamshire.
- Horncastle, Lincolnshire. Bishops Palace.
- London, Camden, Inn of the Bishop of Lincoln, later Southampton House. Purchased from Templars by Bishop Robert de Chesney (1148–68).
- ?Louth, Lincolnshire
- Lyddington Bede House
- Nettleham, Lincolnshire.
- Spaldwick, Huntingdonshire. Bury Close.
- Stow, Lincolnshire
- Thame, Oxfordshire.
- Wooburn, Buckinghamshire. Bishops Palace

== Bibliography ==
- Antram N (revised), Pevsner N & Harris J, (1989), The Buildings of England: Lincolnshire, Yale University Press.
- Chapman H. et al. (1975). Excavations at the Bishop’s Palace, Lincoln, The Society for Lincolnshire History and Archaeology. Occasional Paper 1. Sleaford.
- Coppack G. (2000), Medieval Bishop's Palace, Lincoln English Heritage. ISBN 9781850747574
- Faulkner P. (1974), Lincoln Old Bishops' Palace, Archaeological Journal, Vol. 131, pp. 140–144.
- Willson E. J. (1848), The Ancient Episcopal Palace, Lincoln. Memoirs Illustrative of the History and Antiquities of the City and County of Lincoln. Archaeological Institute of Great Britain and Ireland. London. pg2ff.
