= Vicars' Court, Lincoln =

The Vicars Choral, Lincoln
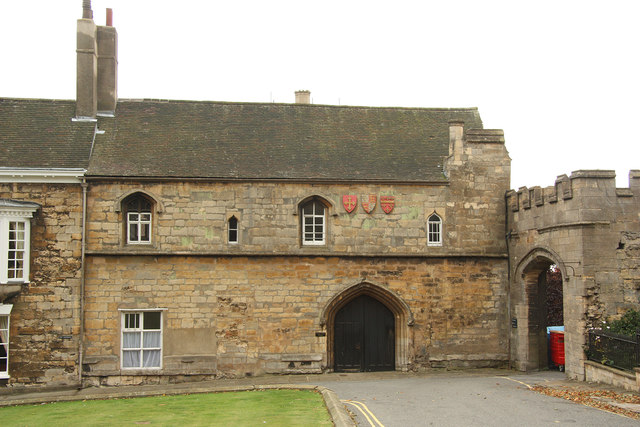
- Gateway to the Vicars' Choral, Lincoln

- Location in Lincolnshire
- 53.2334°N 0.5351°W
- Location: Entrance from Minster Yard, S of Cathedral
- OS grid reference: SK9787371703

History
- Founded: late 13th century by Bishop Sutton.
- Demolished: Partially during English Civil War

Site notes
- Governing body: Dean and Chapter of Lincoln Cathedral

Listed Building – Grade I
- Official name: Vicars Court
- Designated: 8 October 1953
- Reference no.: 1388684

The Vicars’ Court or Vicars’ Choral in Lincoln, is situated in the Minster Yard to the south of Lincoln Cathedral. It was founded as a college of priests by Bishop Sutton in the late 13th century. These priests would take services in the Cathedral in the absence of the Prebendaries. The Vicars‘ Choral of Lincoln is one of eight such colleges in England, and it is also one of the earliest and best preserved. The great majority of the building survives (although not the hall and the chapel). By 1305 the hall, the kitchen and certain chambers were finished. In 1328 lay brothers were admitted and further houses were built for them During the English Civil War, the buildings were badly damaged and afterwards were converted into four houses.

== Architecture ==
The buildings consists of four irregular two-storeyed ranges set around a spacious sloping turfed courtyard. The entrance range facing the cathedral with an entrance gateway is from the 14th century, and has the arms of Bishop Gravesend above the entrance arch. The northern block, on the left, has a near-central 14th-century doorway, with a hood mould and mask stops, flanked to left by a four-centred arched window with another hood mould, and a small pointed arched casement window. The southern range has a central flat-headed doorway with a keystone and a shield above it. To right are a flat-headed window with three-pointed arched lights, and a moulded doorway with hood moulds which are 19th century. Beyond is a single gabled buttress. Above are a large gabled dormer windows to the left, with two smaller dormer windows to the right. Above is a central canted wooden oriel window on a shaped bracket. At the back are four brick-and-stone external buttressed chimneystacks, and a garderobe tower. The interior has several intact garderobes, and at the north end there is a ground-floor medieval ceiling with transverse chamfered beams on double corbels.

== See also: Residences of other Vicars Choral ==
- Vicars' Close, Wells
- College of Minor Canons, St Paul's London
- Exeter (largely destroyed in World War II, the hall partially survives)
- College of Vicars Choral, Hereford (survives in good condition)
- Bedern, York

== See also: Other Residences in Lincoln Cathedral Close and Minster Yard ==
- The Old Deanery, Lincoln
- Lincoln Medieval Bishop's Palace

== Bibliography ==
- Antram N (revised), Pevsner N & Harris J, (1989), The Buildings of England: Lincolnshire, Yale University Press.
- Jones S. (1987) The Survey of Ancient Houses in Lincoln Vol. 2. 40–62
- Padley J.S., (1851) Selections from the Ancient Monastic Ecclesiastical and Domestic edifices of Lincolnshire, Lincoln.
- Stocker, D.A., (1999). The College of the Vicars Choral of York Minster at Bedern: architectural fragments, The Archaeology of York 10/4, CBA: York. ISBN 1902771028.
