= St Mary's Guildhall, Lincoln =

St Mary's Guildhall, High Street, Lincoln
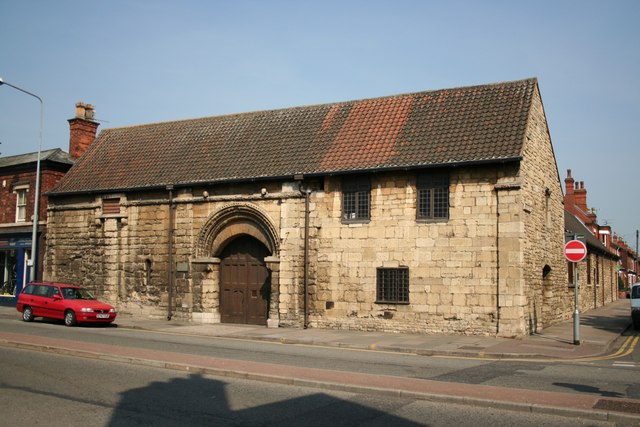

- Location in Lincolnshire
- 53.2222°N 0.5439°W
- Location: Lincoln

History
- Built: 12th century

Site notes
- Architectural style: Medieval stone hall house complex

Listed Building – Grade I
- Official name: St Mary's Guildhall
- Designated: 8 October 1953
- Reference no.: 1388604

St Mary's Guildhall is a major domestic complex, indicating the highest social status, built in the part of the medieval city of Lincoln, England, known as Wigford. The Guildhall faces directly onto Lincoln High Street and stands to the north of Sibthorp Street. To the south is the late Saxon church of St Peter at Gowts. Stocker describes it as "the only survivor from the small group of the king's town houses which existed in several major towns….St Mary's Guildhall is a domestic complex on a palatial scale, indicating the highest social status, and as such is representative of a little known urban building type".

== History of the Guildhall ==
It is now thought that the Guildhall was a built as a Royal palace of Henry II and completed by 1157, although there is no absolutely certain evidence that it was in Royal ownership before 1228. In 1251 the building was sold by Henry III’s butler, Michael de la Burne, to the guild of St Mary of Lincoln. It remained in the ownership of the guild until 1547 when it passed into the ownership of the Lincoln City Council. Until 1614 it was leased to various tenants, but in that year it was leased to the recently established Lincoln Christ's Hospital School, a Bluecoat school. This lease continued until 1633, although the school had moved to a new site on the Christ’s Hospital Terrace, just below Lincoln Cathedral, in 1623. Subsequent leases were to the Fawkes family who sub-let parts of the property. In 1815 it was leased to Coningsby Waldo-Sibthorp MP, of Canwick Hall; the lease shows that the northern part of the property was being used for malting. Following the Municipal Reform Act 1835, his son Charles de Laet Sibthorp was able to purchase the Guildhall and the Paddock behind for £455. The paddock behind the buildings was used as the first home of Lincoln City Football Club between 1884 and 1895. Gradually the Lucas family of builders took over the leases for the property. The Maltings had been leased to the brewing firm Warwicks and Richardsons, which ceased operations around 1913. The Sibthorp Street estate was laid out in the 1890s and the two early houses of the west wing of the palace were demolished in 1896 to make way for the street.

In 1930 the building was designated as a scheduled monument. Following the death of Coningsby Charles Waldo Sibthorp in 1932 an appeal was launched to purchase the Guildhall, but in 1938 the City Council stepped in and purchased the Guildhall. The building continued to be occupied by Lucas’s as a builder’s yard until 1981, when it was leased by the Lincoln Civic Trust. Between 1981 and 1986 excavation and recording of the buildings took place, and between 1984 and 1986 restoration followed. The Guildhall is now used as the offices of the Lincoln Civic Trust and as a church hall.

=== Occupation on the site before the building of the Guildhall ===
Excavations in 1982 and 1983 found evidence of the Roman road known as Fosse Way under the frontage of the Guildhall, and it appears to have been converging at this point with the Ermine Street Roman road. To the east of the Fosse Way there were two Roman buildings of the 3rd century AD with stone foundations and timber-framed structures. The Roman road showed marked rutting from carts. There was also evidence for Late Saxon structures and rubbish pits of 10th–12th century date.

== Royal Palace theory ==
The realisation that the St Mary Guildhall was not specifically built for the Great Guild of the Blessed Virgin Mary, and, that it was built at some time previous to 1251/2, when it was acquired by the Guild, opens up the possibility that it had been a Royal Palace or hospicium, where King Henry II had a crown wearing or second crowning. This ceremony took place in 1157 on a visit to the city at Christmas. Henry II had a number of provincial palaces including those at Oxford, Gloucester, and Winchester. The existence of one in Lincoln is known from the chronicler Roger of Hoveden. Roger refers to a palace in the suburb of Wigford in Lincoln. Also in the same year Henry authorised the expenditure of £7/15/- on the repairs to the Hospicium and the expenditure of £30 on his retinue of huntsmen, squires and others who accompanied him there. David Stocker has argued that by far the most likely building in Wigford to have been Henry’s Palace would have been the Guildhall. Architectural stone fragments from the building, particularly those with acanthus scrolls and volutes, can be fairly closely dated to the period 1150–70, and this would fit in with the date of the building of the Guildhall. The mention of "repairs" (in reparatione) in 1157 was a term that often indicated the final expenses on completion of a building. Stocker's main case rests on the fact that the St Mary Guildhall was built on a much grander scale than the other Romanesque Houses in Lincoln, such as the Norman House, Jew's House and the demolished St Andrew's Hall. He points out that the first floor great hall of the Guildhall, with its arcaded decoration, measures 20 m × 6.5 m, which makes it amongst the largest in a surviving building of the 12th century. Details of other Royal Halls are discussed in The History of the King's Works by Howard Colvin. However, the earlier ownership of Guildhall as constructed by Johnson does not fully fit this idea, even though the property was certainly owned by King Henry III. Johnson deduces that the property was originally owned by John de Holm (whose son, Adam was the first Mayor of Lincoln until 1216). John de Holm sold the Guildhall in 1228, via John le Marshall to King Henry. The King appears to have used the building for wine storage and then disposed of it to his butler, de la Burne in 1250, who almost immediately sold it to the Guild of St Mary in 1250/1. However, as there is some uncertainty about the property boundaries, and it may be that Henry III was adding a further property to the one he already owned, this does not necessarily rule out the idea that Guildhall was originally a Royal palace.

=== Samuel Hieronymous Grimm and the recording of the Guildhall c. 1784 ===
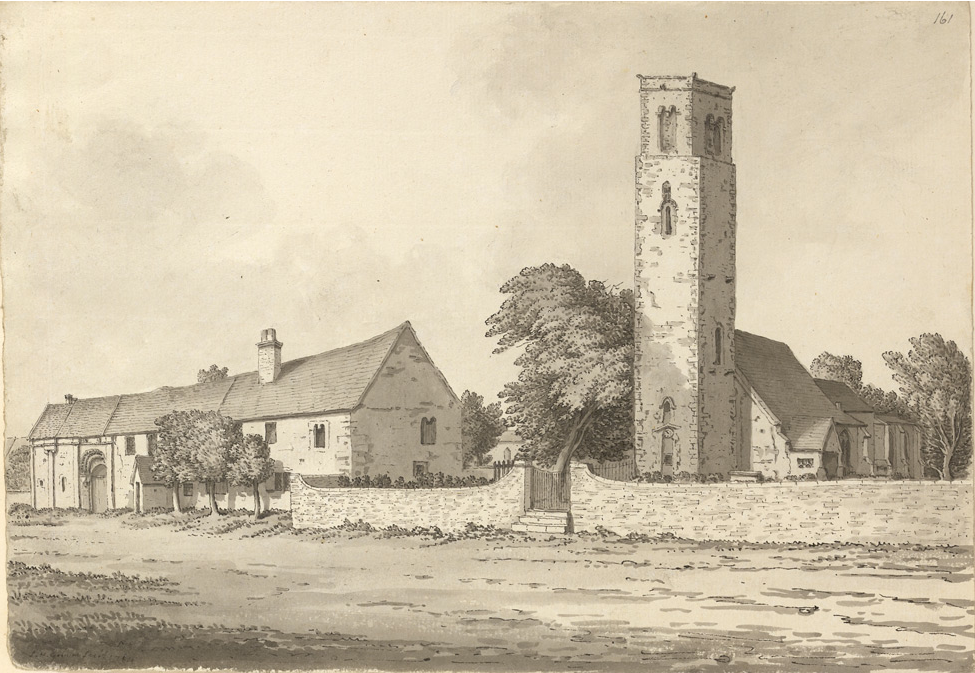
St Peter at Gowts church and the St Mary Guildhall by Samuel Hieronymous Grimm, 1784

One of the most useful sources of information for the history of the Guildhall are the ink-wash drawings of Samuel Hieronymous Grimm, a Swiss artist who was extensively employed by the Dean of Lincoln, Sir Richard Kaye, mainly to record architectural subjects. Many of these drawings are in the British Library but there are some of his drawings in the Usher Gallery in Lincoln. There are four drawings of the St Mary Guildhall, done about 1784. These include a view looking up the High Street with the Saxon Church of St Peter at Gowts in the foreground on the right and St Mary's Guildhall to the left. The stone house closest to the church with the chimney, together with the bay with the porch next to the Guildhall, were demolished in 1896 to make way for Sibthorp Street. There is another view in the Usher Gallery which is looking at the Guildhall from the opposite direction and provides more information about the houses to the south which were demolished. Although these demolished houses contain Romanesque windows it is likely that they were rebuilt in the 17th century making use of earlier building material.

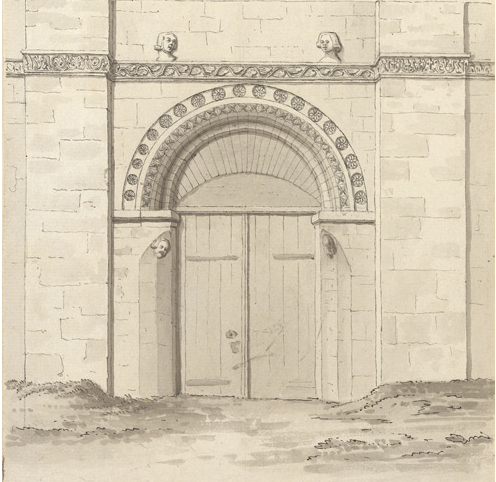
St Mary Guildhall, Lincoln. Norman gateway drawn by S. H. Grimm in 1784

Grimm also provides a detailed drawing of the main entrance showing the orders of the arch studded with flowers and dogtooth ornament and two heads on the door jamb, one of which is a bishop. Above this is a running frieze with two heads above.

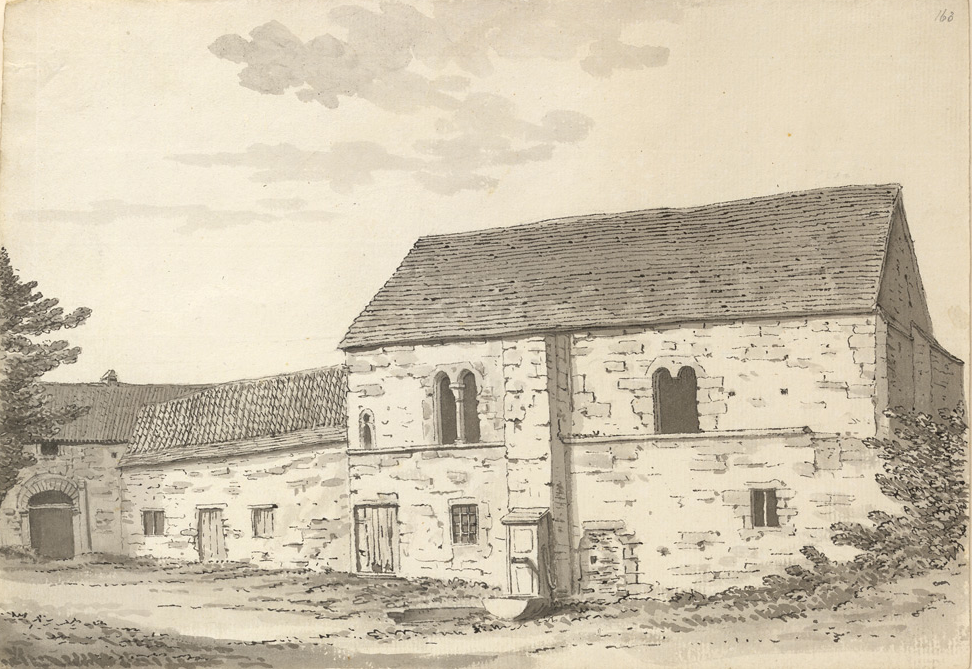
Norman House, St Mary Guildhall, Lincoln by S. H. Grimm in 1784

The survey work on the west front has shown that originally the Guildhall had a first-floor hall that was lit with five Romanesque windows, similar to those on St Andrew's Hall on the opposite side of the street. The frontage also had two tall chimney stacks. Grimm also drew the Norman House which stands on the north side of the courtyard behind the Guildhall. Although this building has two Romanesque windows and a massive pilaster on the front, it is in all probability an early 17th-century rebuild from the time that the Christ's Hospital Bluecoat School occupied the premises. The Romanesque windows appear to be very similar to those on the buildings that were demolished in 1896, and possibly would have come from the source. The Norman House and adjacent building were used in the later 18th and 19th centuries as a malting floor and barley store.

=== Architectural history ===
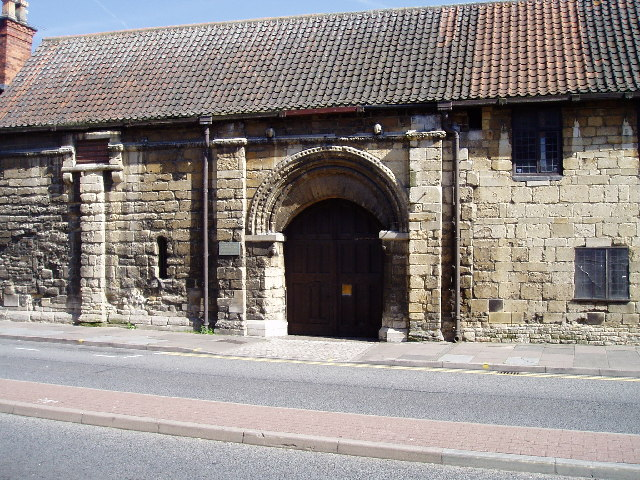
West front of St Mary Guildhall

The exterior of the west range faces Lincoln High Street, The facade consists of five bays, has shallow buttresses, and a chamfered plinth and band of Romanesque decoration with bird and beast masks to the northern part. Nearly central to the limestone frontage is a moulded carriageway arch with a segmental pointed inner arch, flanked by single buttresses. Above it are two reset masks.

In the courtyard behind is a two-storey building of two bays, known as the Norman House, with a shallow central buttress and a moulded first-floor band. The lower south range of five bays, fronting Sibthorp Street, incorporates several reset 12th-century fragments and is now the church Hall for St Peter's at Gowts Church Hall.

== Literature ==
- Hill, J. W. F., (1948), Medieval Lincoln, Cambridge University Press, pp. 163, 167, & 168.
- Stocker, D. A., et al (1991).St Mary's Guildhall, Lincoln. The Survey and Excavation of a Medieval Building Complex C.B.A. /City of Lincoln Archaeology Unit: The Archaeology of Lincoln, Vol. XII–1. ISBN 1872414265
- Watkins, W., (1913). "The buildings of St Mary Guild, Lincoln. Locally known as John O'Gaunts Stables". Journal of the Royal Institute of British Architects, Vol. 20, 157–64.

== See also – Medieval Domestic Architecture in Lincoln ==
- Whitefriars, 333 High Street, Lincoln
- Jew's House
- Jew's Court
- John of Gaunt's Palace, Lincoln
