= Steep Hill =

Street in Lincoln, Lincolnshire, England

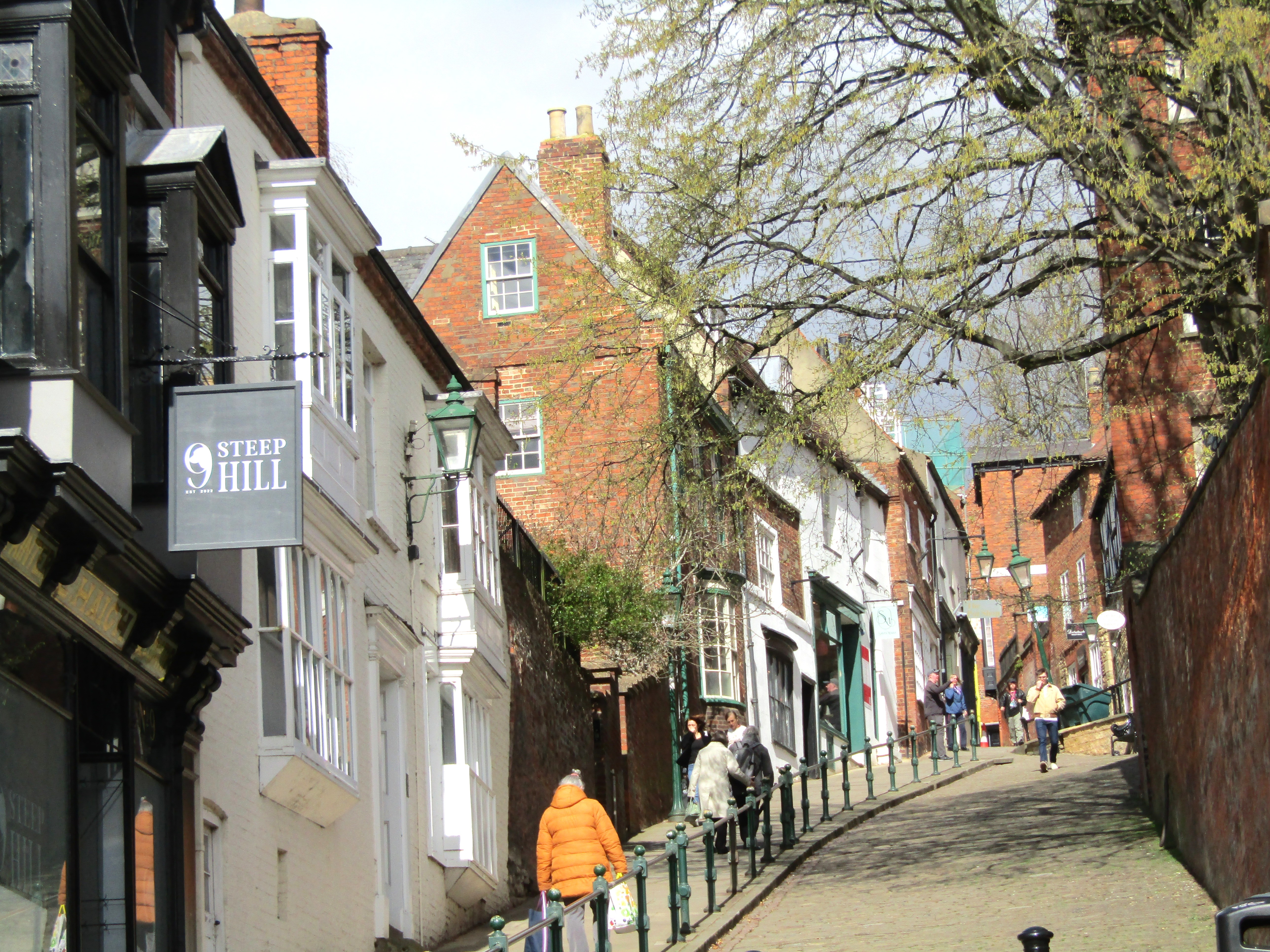
- View of Steep Hill
- Interactive map of Steep Hill
- Former name(s): Ermine Street, Iter VI of the Antonine Itinerary
- Maintained by: Lincolnshire County Council
- Length: 420 m (1,380 ft)
- Addresses: 1-65
- Location: Lincoln, England
- Postal code: LN2 1LU
- Coordinates: 53°13′58″N 0°32′18″W
- Uphill end: Bailgate; 53°13′59″N 0°32′19″W
- Major junctions: Well Lane, Wordsworth Street, Michaelgate, Christ's Hospital Terrace
- Downhill end: Danes Terrace, The Strait; 53°13′56″N 0°32′19″W

Construction
- Commissioned: Roman Empire
- Construction start: 1st Century

Steep Hill is a street in the historic city of Lincoln, Lincolnshire, England. At the top of the hill is the entrance to Lincoln Cathedral and at the bottom is Well Lane. The Hill consists of independent shops, tea rooms and public houses.

Its name arises from the gradient of the hill, which is difficult to ascend and descend. The hill has a one-in-seven (14%) gradient.

== Route ==
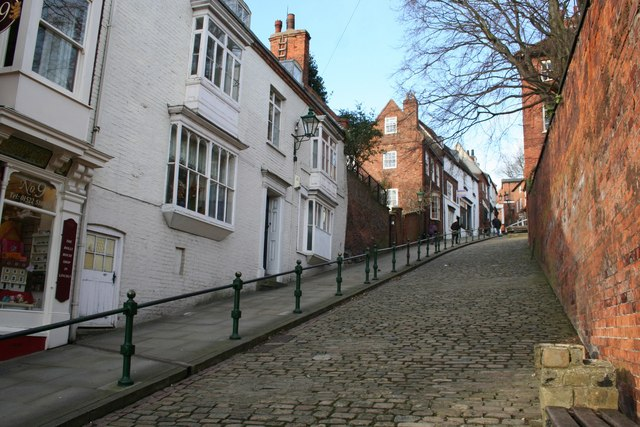
Steepest part of the hill with a handrail.

The bottom leads to The Strait. Three-quarters of the way up is the junction with Wordsworth Street, on which is Chad Varah House, the former home of the Departments of Conservation & Restoration and History of Art & Design of the University of Lincoln, and of the Lincoln School of Theology, currently being converted into dwellings. From this junction, the road narrows and leads past the Wig & Mitre pub and Brown's Pie Shop and to Castle Hill to the left and Exchequergate to the right.

The central (and steepest) part of the route has a one in five (20%) gradient, is unsuited to any form of vehicle, and only passable on foot. A handrail is provided along this section. The route is part of the Roman route from the ford over the River Witham to the Forum in modern Bailgate, and thus the final part of Ermine Street and Iter VI of the Antonine Itinerary.

== Architecture ==
Two Norman houses lie on the street, Jew's House and Norman House, the latter formerly known as "Aaron the Jew's House". Both display characteristic Norman mullioned windows. Adjacent to and above the Jew's House stands Jews' Court, said to be from the Norman period but not displaying any obvious Norman features. There are some jettied half-timbered houses towards the top.

In 2011, Steep Hill was named "Britain's Best Place" by the Academy of Urbanism, an award which aims for planners and architects to be able to "learn about place".
