= Michael Honywood =

English churchman, died 1681

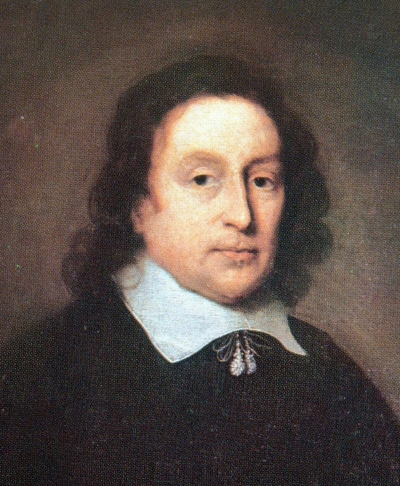
Michael Honywood by Cornelis Janssens van Ceulen

Michael Honywood DD (1597 – 7 December 1681) was an English churchman who was Dean of Lincoln from 1660. Honywood was a bibliophile and he founded and funded the Lincoln Cathedral Library.

== Life ==
He was sixth son and ninth child of Sir Robert Honywood of Charing, Kent, and of Marks Hall, Essex, by his second wife, Elizabeth, daughter of Sir Thomas Browne of Betchworth Castle, Surrey. He was educated at Christ's College, Cambridge, and graduated BA in January 1615, MA 1618, BD 1636, and DD (by royal mandate) 1661.

Honywood became fellow of Christ's, where Thomas Bainbrigg was master, and served the university offices of taxor in 1623, and of proctor in 1628. Richard Crackenthorpe, a friend, records help received from Honywood in his work on logic. He took part in college management, and helped forward the erection of the new Fellows' Building, completed in 1644, by advancing money, which was not repaid till 27 August 1649. While Honywood remained a fellow, John Milton was not eligible for a fellowship, under a statute limiting fellows to just one per county (by birth: Honywood and Milton were both born in Middlesex.

In 1640 Honywoood was appointed rector of the college living of St Andrew's Church, Kegworth, Leicestershire, but he did not reside there; and when the First English Civil War threatened Cambridge at the beginning of 1642, he crossed to the Low Countries. During the Protectorate he was at Utrecht, enjoying the friendship of William Sancroft and devoting himself to the collection of books. Another fellow bibliophile and friend from this time was Thomas Browne.

In 1643 Bainbrigg ineffectually wrote to Honywood urging him to return, so as not to exceed the statutable limit of absence, which would defeat his wish that Honywood should succeed him as master. In 1645 Honywood was still abroad. Over Bainbrigg's protests, the parliamentary commissioners for Leicestershire sequestered Honywood's living of Kegworth, and a new rector was appointed in 1649.

At the Restoration Honywood returned to England, and resumed his living in Kegworth. The sectaries in his parish gave him some trouble, and in 1667 Richard Gibson, a Quaker who refused to pay his tithes, was thrown into prison, and was detained there for several years at Honywood's suit. Some of the fellows of Christ's College hoped that he might be appointed master, at a time when Ralph Cudworth held the post.

On 12 October 1660 Honywood was installed dean of Lincoln, retaining Kegworth in commendam for the rest of his life. He set to work to repair the damage done to Lincoln Cathedral and its precincts, and re-established the long-suspended choral service, finding money for both from his own purse. He defended the old rights of the dean and chapter and reasserted the franchises of the close.

Honywood died unmarried at his deanery on 7 December 1681, aged 85. He gave £100 towards the rebuilding of St Paul's Cathedral. Friends included Herbert Thorndike, Humphrey Henchman and George Morley, and Samuel Pepys, who called him "a simple priest, though a good well-meaning man" (Diary, 6 August 1664).

== Lincoln Cathedral Library ==
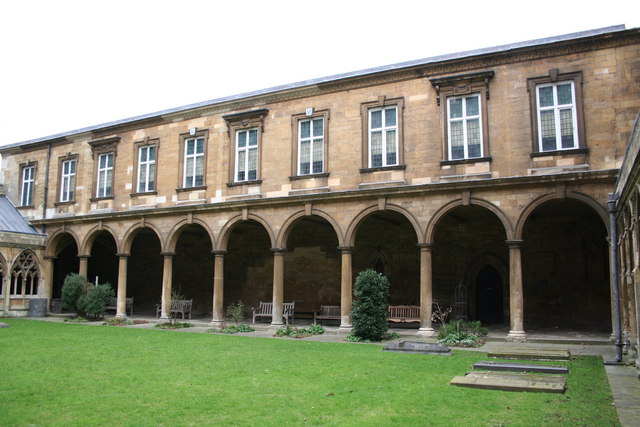
Wren Library, Lincoln Cathedral

Honywood's major work contribution to Lincoln Cathedral was to spend £780 of his own money on the library which was designed by Sir Christopher Wren, on the site of the ruined north walk of the cloister. In this building he placed 5,000 of his own books, which he presented to the chapter. Honywood's books were in two collections. His first collection was gathered in England and it had been seized by Parliamentary forces when he was abroad. His brothers are thought to have interceded as his eldest brother was a Parliamentarian colonel. The second part of the collection consisted of the books that Honywood had purchased whilst he was in Holland before the Restoration.

The collection contained (2014) a series of rare seventeenth-century tracts, including the first issue of John Milton's Lycidas, his Tetrachordon, and Smectymnuus. Early printed books of William Caxton, Wynkyn de Worde and others, which originally formed part of Honywood's library, were sold by the chapter at the suggestion of Thomas Frognall Dibdin, with his Lincolne Nosegaie.

Today the "Wren Library" contains portraits of Honywood and his grandmother, Mary Honywood, who had 114 grandchildren.

== Family ==
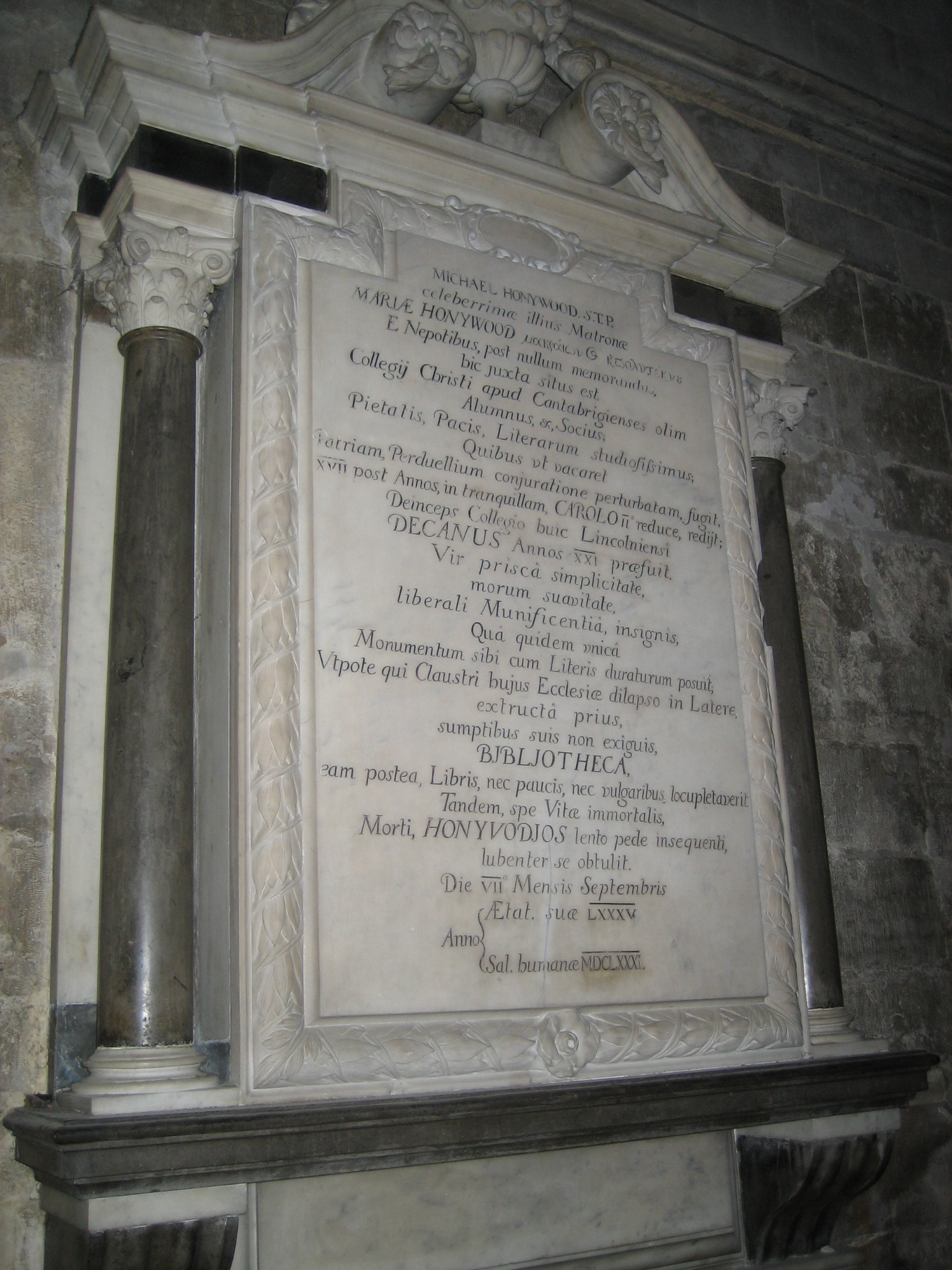
Honywood's memorial in the nave of Lincoln Cathedral

Honeywood's grandmother was Mary Honywood a woman known for her longevity and the number of descendants she had.

The parliamentarian Thomas Honywood was an older brother and Robert Honywood was a half brother.

== Notes ==
Attribution

This article incorporates text from a publication now in the public domain: Lee, Sidney, ed. (1891). "Honywood, Michael". Dictionary of National Biography. Vol. 28. London: Smith, Elder & Co.
