= Lincoln Cathedral Library =

Cathedral library in Lincoln, England

Coordinates: 53.2348°N 0.5358°W

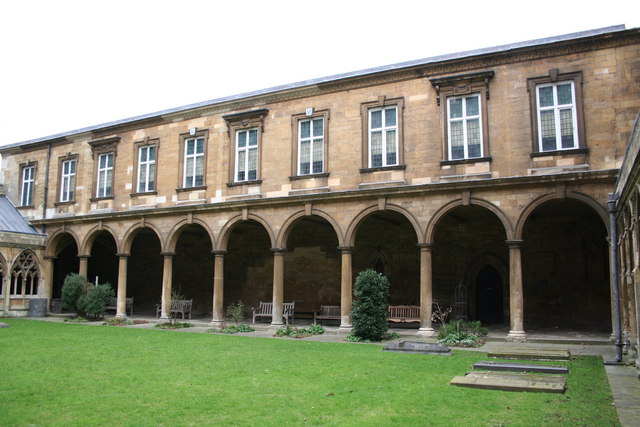
Wren Library building

The Lincoln Cathedral Library is a library of Lincoln Cathedral in Lincolnshire, England. It is housed in a building designed by Christopher Wren.

== Collections ==
The collection includes 120 “incunabula”, that is books printed before 1500. As well as a reference collection of c.10,000 items, there are 260 mediaeval manuscripts, including works of theology, canon law, devotional books, music and literature, and the following:

- Lincoln's Chapter Bible - commissioned for the new cathedral by Nicholas, Archdeacon of Huntingdon in the late 11th century
- The fifteenth-century "Thornton Romances" found in the Lincoln Thornton Manuscript - includes the earliest written account of the death of King Arthur, and was a source for the poet Thomas Malory's Morte d'Arthur.
- Mamusse Wunneetupanatamwe Up-Biblum God (aka: Algonquian Bible) was the first Bible printed in the Americas in 1663. The English Puritan missionary John Eliot produced a translation of the Geneva Bible into the Indian Massachusett language
- A manuscript of the Ecclesiastical History of the English People by Bede

The devotional books include an illuminated Book of Hours which is small enough to fit into a pocket.

== History ==
=== Pre civil war ===
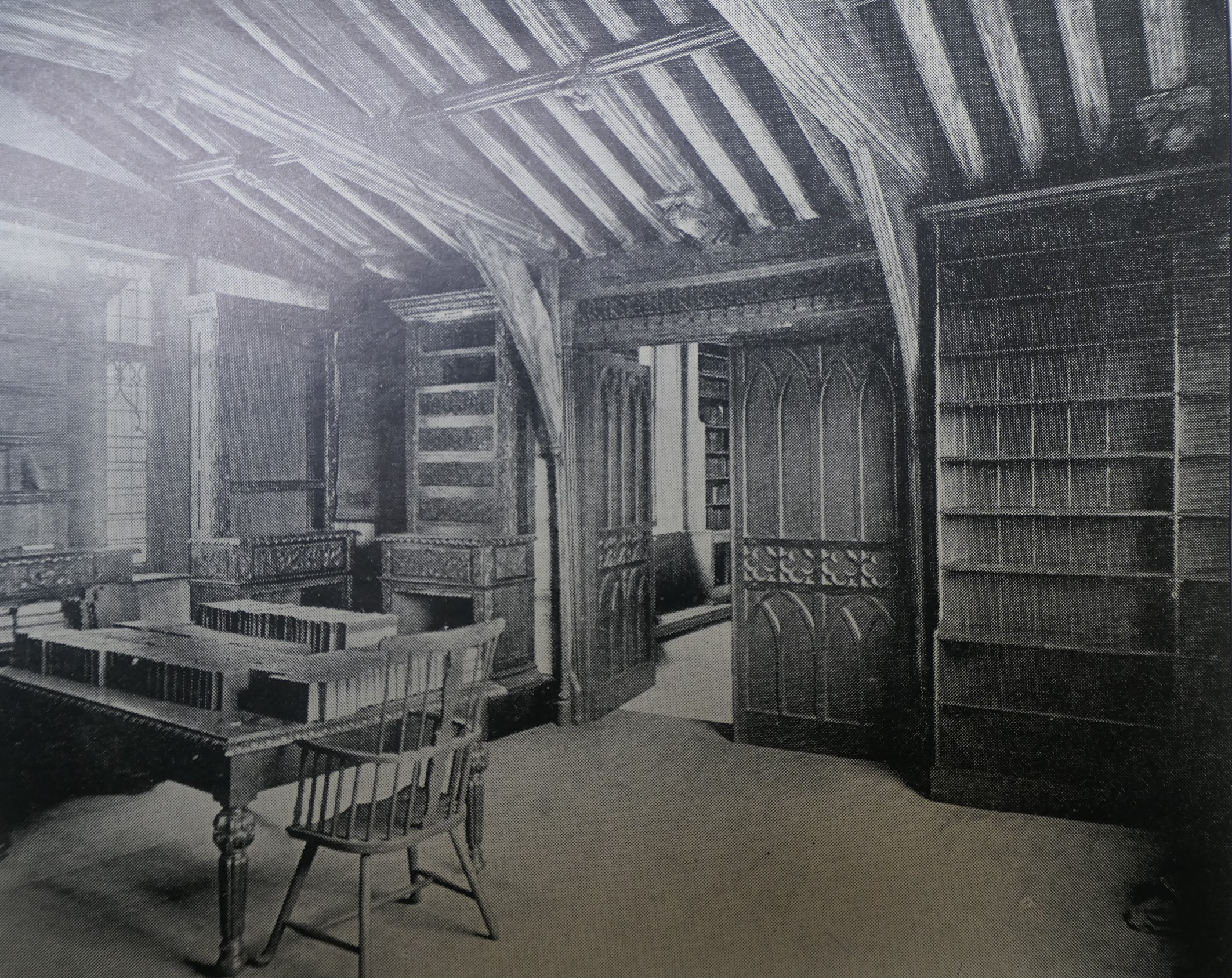
The Mediaeval Library, Lincoln Cathedral, c. 1923

In the mediaeval era the manuscripts were kept in a chest or cupboard, and scholars came from great distances to consult them.

By 1422 a new, chained library had been built over the east walk of the Cloister, adjoining the Chapter House. Three of the mediaeval reading desks and one bench survive in the Mediaeval Library, which was built to accommodate around a hundred manuscripts.

=== Wren Library ===
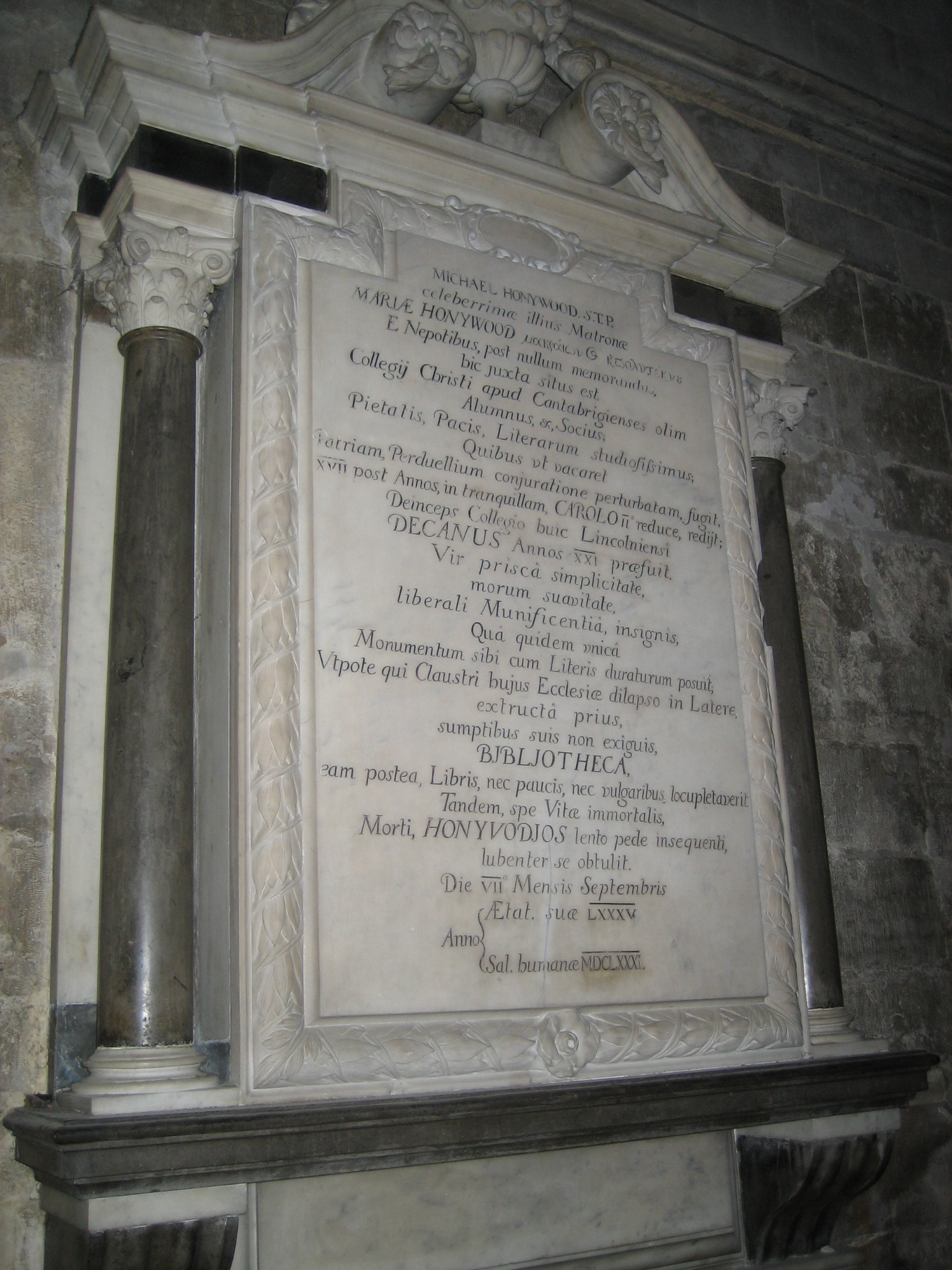
Honywood's memorial in the cathedral nave

Michael Honywood was made Dean of Lincoln at the Restoration of the Monarchy in 1660, with the huge task of repairing the fabric of the cathedral, ravaged by the Parliamentarian soldiers during the Civil War. General repairs took him until 1674, when he was finally able to begin his cherished project of providing a new library building with £780 of his own money on the site of the ruined north cloister.

Honywood commissioned the design from Sir Christopher Wren, who also supervised throughout, as is indicated by a page which survives in the Cathedral collections, setting out the prices for painting and gilding, and written and signed by Wren. The external Tuscan Doric colonnade of the exterior is serenely classical yet the inside is full of Baroque features: advancing and receding planes and cornice, which give interest to a long, narrow room; and the trompe-l'œil marbling. Through removal of the added paint layers some of the original marbling has been revealed; where it has not been revealed (due to expense and conservation concerns) a reproduction marbling has been painted over the layers.

The terms laid out in the contracts for the building specified that the building should be completed in two years.

Honywood bequeathed his 5,000 books (including one of only 250 manuscript versions of Chaucer's Canterbury Tales) to the Dean and Chapter - these are still in the building built for them.

Lincoln is one of only two surviving Wren libraries; the other is the Wren Library of Trinity College, Cambridge, designed by Wren in 1676.

Displayed under the staircase leading to the Library is a Roman mosaic discovered in the cloister in 1793.

The Wren Library is currently closed to the public for extensive repairs to the ceiling.

== Bibliography ==
Catalogue of the Manuscripts of Lincoln Cathedral Chapter Library Rodney M. Thomson; Boydell & Brewer (1989)
