= Norman House =

Grade I listed town house in Lincoln, UK

Coordinates: 53.2337°N 0.5387°W

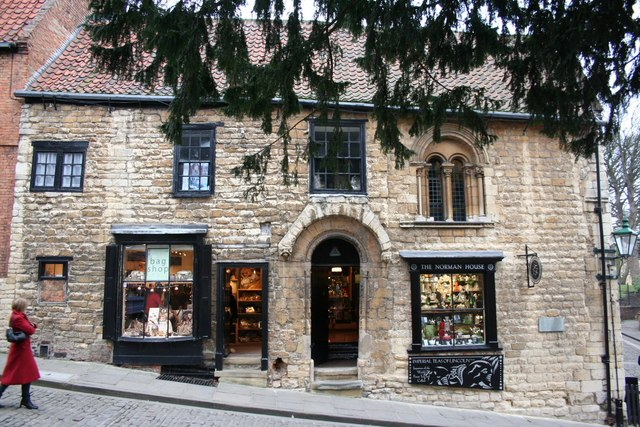
Norman House – frontage on Steep Hill

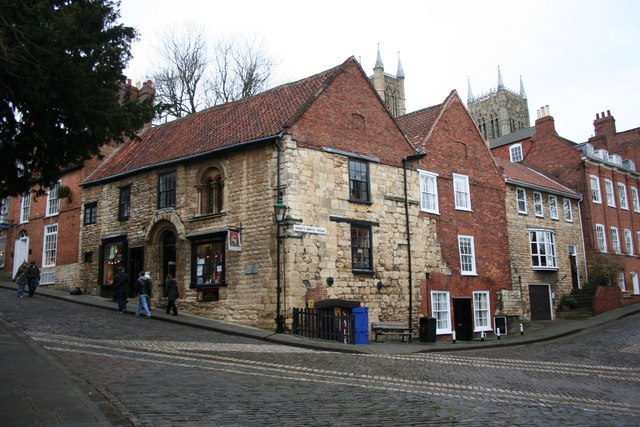
Norman House showing the corner of Steep Hill and Christ's Hospital Terrace

Norman House on Steep Hill, Lincoln, England is a historic building and an example of Norman domestic architecture.

The building is at 46–47 Steep Hill and 7 Christ's Hospital Terrace. The architectural evidence suggests a date between 1170 and 1180. The building was known for many years as "Aaron the Jew's House", and appears as such in many references, as it was thought to be the former residence of Aaron of Lincoln (c.1125–1186), although this is now considered incorrect.

The building has been a shop for many years, and is currently home to a tea importers.

It has been designated a Grade I listed building by English Heritage.

== See also ==
- Jew's House
- Jew's Court
- John of Gaunt's Palace, Lincoln
- St Mary's Guildhall, Lincoln
