= Jews' Court, Lincoln =

Jew's Court
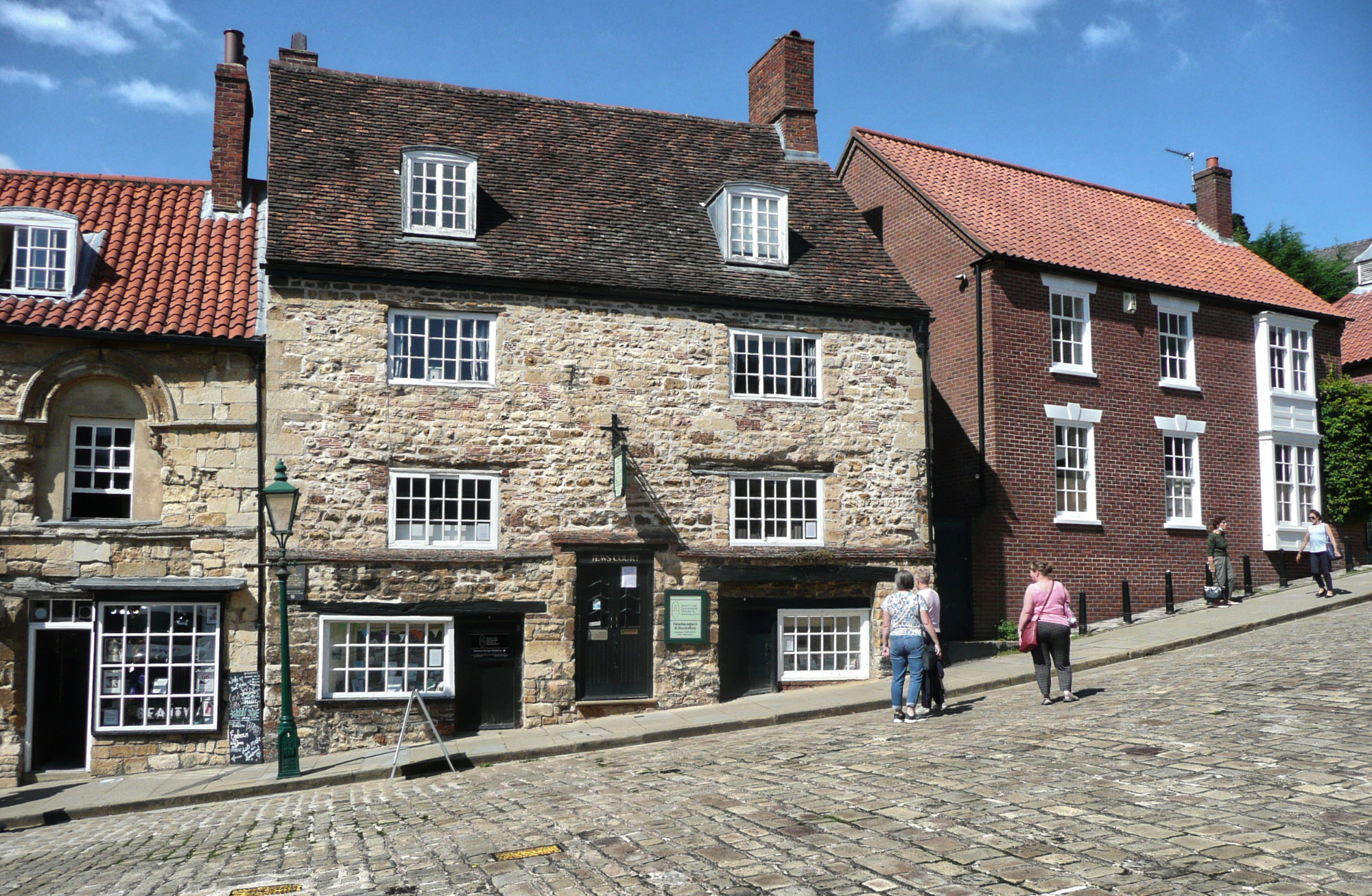
- The façade of Jew's Court in the middle

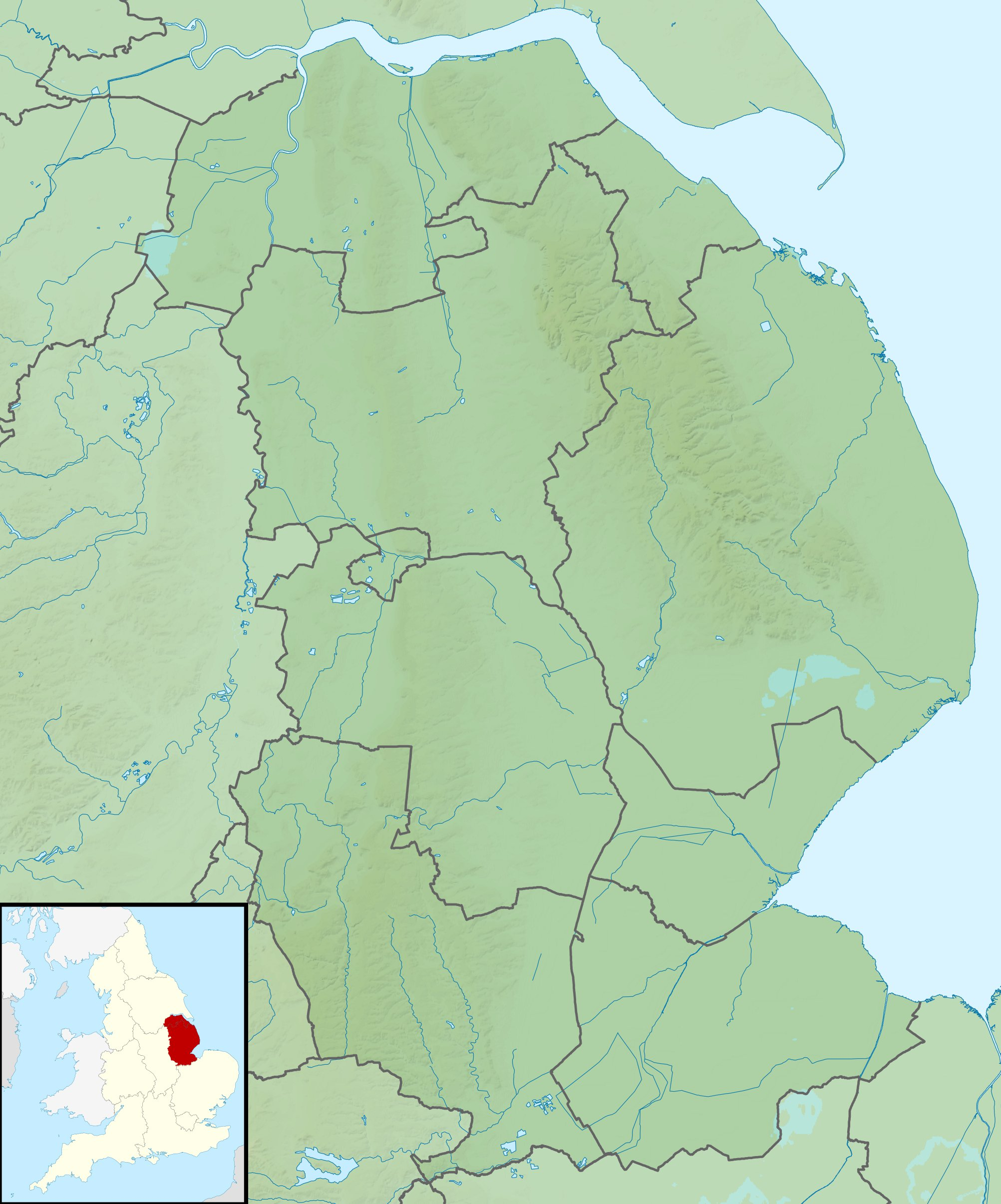
- Location of the museum in Lincolnshire

Religion
- Affiliation: Reform Judaism
- Rite: Liberal
- Ecclesiastical or organisational status: Synagogue

Location
- Location: Steep Hill, Lincoln, Lincolnshire
- Country: England
- Coordinates: 53°13′56″N 0°32′19″W

Architecture
- Style: Norman architecture
- Completed: c. 1170
- Materials: Stone

Listed Building – Grade I
- Official name: Jew's Court
- Type: Listed building
- Designated: 7 October 1953
- Reference no.: 1388769

Jews' Court is a largely 17th-century building located on Steep Hill in Lincoln, Lincolnshire, England. The building was listed as a Grade I building in 1953 and houses the headquarters of the Society for Lincolnshire History and Archaeology.

== History ==
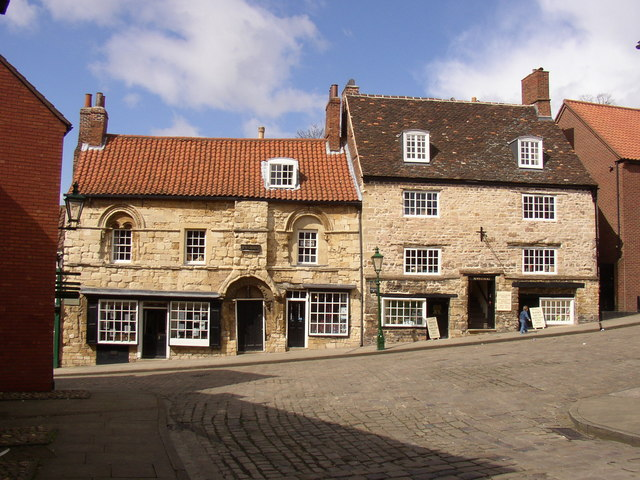
Jews' Court is next to the Jew's House on Steep Hill, Lincoln

Jews' Court is located immediately above Jew's House on Steep Hill. The three-storeyed stone building dates from c. 1170 but was altered in the early 17th century and the windows were replaced in the early-19th and 20th centuries. Jews' Court may contain some late medieval stonework but a recent architectural survey has shown that there is very little medieval stonework above basement level in the existing building. Historian Cecil Roth believed it to be the site of a medieval synagogue. Documentary evidence of 1290 when the Jewish community of Lincoln was expelled shows that the Jews' Court has always been divided into two houses, and a charter of 1316 mentions that a Jewish scola or synagogue had stood to the west in the tenement behind these two houses.

In 1910, a well was dug in the basement of the building; the owner subsequently claimed that this was where the body of Little Saint Hugh of Lincoln had been found and charged people to see it.

By the early 20th century the property had been sub-divided into cheap accommodation. It was bought by Lincoln City Council in 1924 and in 1928 it was proposed to be demolished under a slum clearance order. Lincolnshire Architectural and Archaeological Society (a predecessor of the Society for Lincolnshire History and Archaeology) objected to the proposed demolition and were given the building by the city council on condition it was refurbished. In 1966 the property passed from Lincolnshire Architectural and Archaeological Society to form the Jews' Court and Bardney Abbey Trust, which in 2019 was merged with the Society for Lincolnshire History and Archaeology. The Society for Lincolnshire History and Archaeology has its headquarters at Jews' Court and the building includes a lecture room and bookshop.

== Current synagogue ==
The Lincolnshire Jewish Community, which is affiliated with Liberal Judaism, in 1992 began holding Shabbat and High Holy Day services in the lecture room at Jews' Court; one of the services was filmed in the TV series The Story of the Jews by Simon Schama.

== See also ==
- Bardney Abbey
- History of the Jews in England
- Jew's House
- List of Jewish communities in the United Kingdom
- List of synagogues in the United Kingdom
- Norman House ("Aaron the Jew's House")
- St Mary's Guildhall, Lincoln
