= Jew's House =

Jew's House, Lincoln
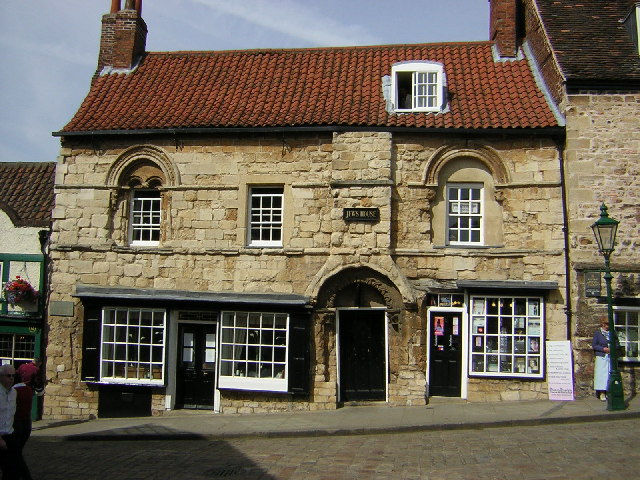
- Frontage of the Jew's House, Lincoln

- Location in Lincolnshire
- 53.2322°N 0.5388°W
- Location: At the junction of Steep Hill and the Strait, between Uphill and Downhill, Lincoln
- OS grid reference: SK9763371566

History
- Built: Later 12th Century

Site notes
- Architectural style: Romanesque Town House

Listed Building – Grade I
- Official name: Jews House
- Designated: 8 October 1953
- Reference no.: 1388810

The Jew's House is one of the earliest extant town houses in England, estimated to have been built around 1170. It is situated on Steep Hill in Lincoln, immediately below Jew's Court. The house has traditionally been associated with the thriving Jewish community in Medieval Lincoln. Antisemitic hysteria was stoked by a notorious 1255 blood libel alleging that the mysterious death of a Christian child, known as Little Saint Hugh of Lincoln, was the result of him allegedly being kidnapped and ritually killed by Jews. In 1290, the entire Jewish community was expelled from England by Edward I, and the Jew's House is said to have been seized from a Jewish owner. The building has remained continuously occupied to the present day. Since about 1973 it has been used as a restaurant; prior to that it had been an antiques shop for many years.

== Architecture ==
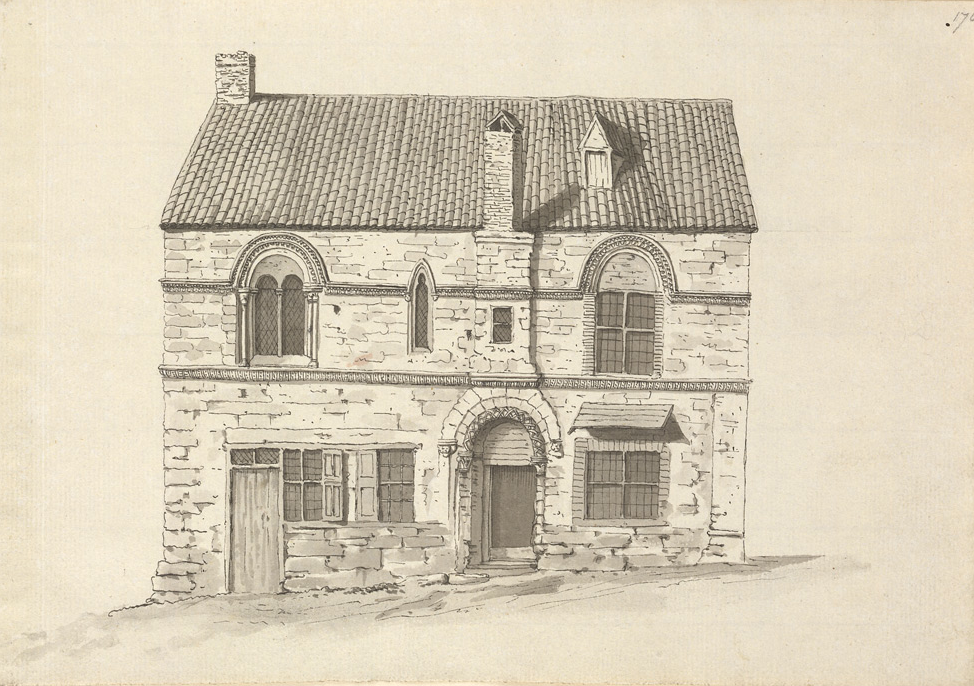
The Jew’s House, Lincoln by Samuel Hieronymus Grimm about 1784

The Jew's House is built in the local limestone in the Norman or Romanesque style. Dating from the mid-twelfth century, the building originally consisted of a hall at the first floor level, measuring approximately 12 by 6 metres, above service and storage spaces at the ground level.

Part of the original façade survives; the elaborately carved doorway, the remains of two Romanesque double-arch windows and much of the stonework on the upper storey. A chimney breast rises over the arch above the front door, serving the fireplace on the upper floor. There were once two columns supporting the arch, but these have gone.

== See also ==
- Norman House
- Whitefriars, 333 High Street, Lincoln
- John of Gaunt's Palace, Lincoln
- St Mary's Guildhall, Lincoln

== Literature ==
- Anon. (1983) Norman Buildings in Lincoln, Lincolnshire Museums Information Sheet, Archaeology Series 26.
- Antram N (revised), Pevsner N & Harris J, (1989), The Buildings of England: Lincolnshire, Yale University Press. pg 525.
- M. E. Wood (1974), Revised ed. Norman Domestic Architecture.
