= St Benedict's Church, Lincoln =

Coordinates: 53°13′46.77″N 0°32′23.76″W

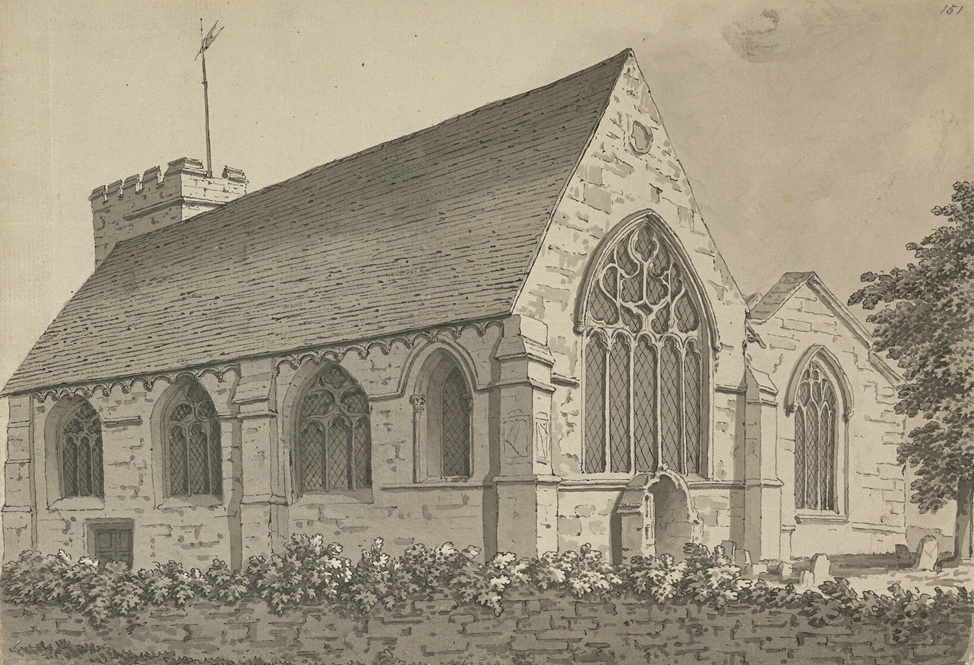
- St Benedict’s Church, by Samuel Hieronymus Grimm, 1784

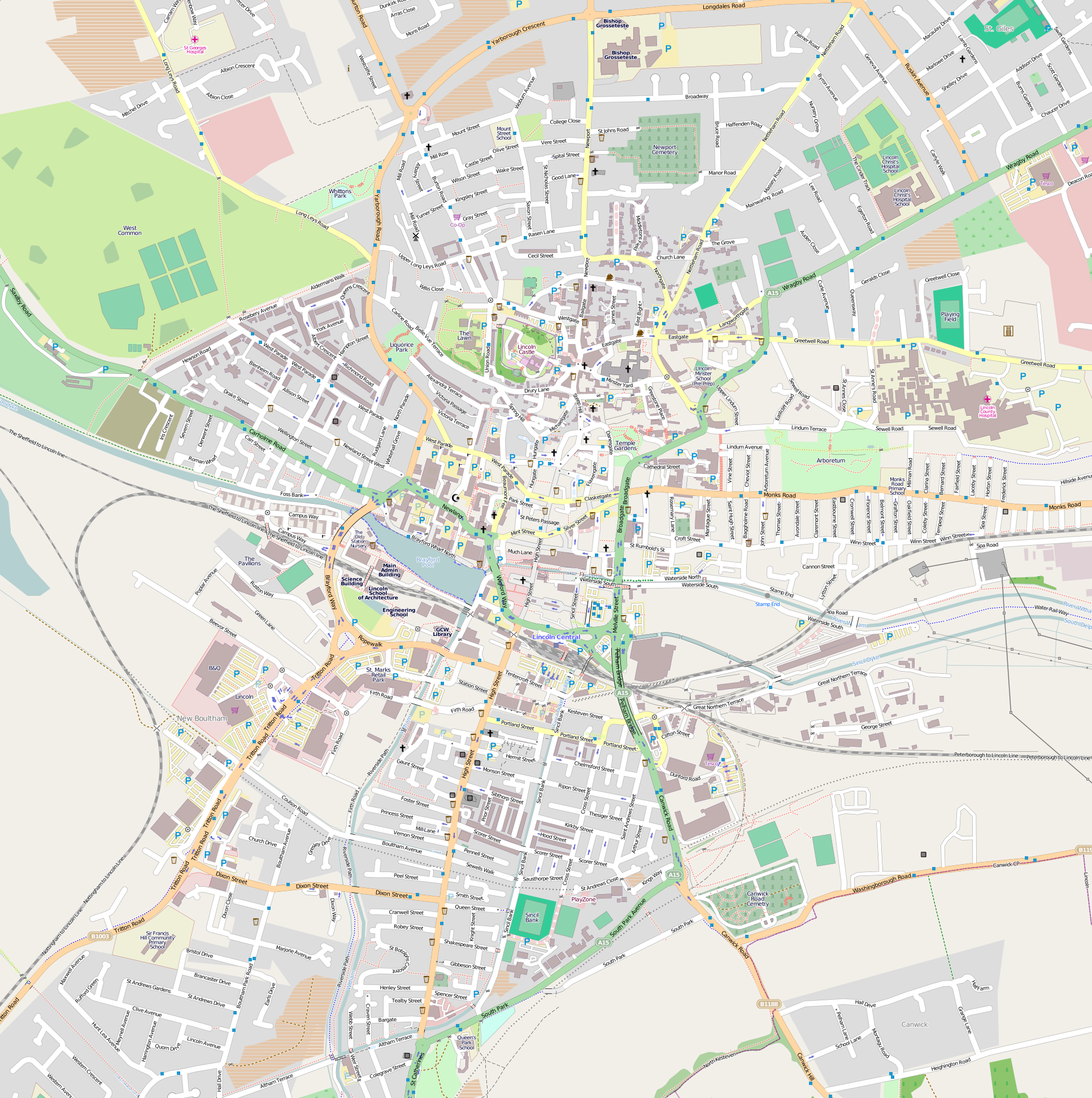
- Shown within Lincoln
- OS grid reference: SK 97480 71117
- Location: Lincoln, Lincolnshire
- Country: England
- Denomination: Church of England

Architecture
- Functional status: Now the Lincoln Street Pastors Base & Office, and Unicorn Tree Bookshop.
- Heritage designation: Grade II*
- Designated: 8 October 1953
- Style: Medieval
- Closed: 1931

Administration
- Diocese: Lincoln

St Benedict's Church, Lincoln is an ancient church in Lincoln, England which is mentioned in 1107 and before the English Civil War was the Lincoln civic church. It was extensively destroyed in the Civil War, and was only partially restored. The tower was re-built imitating the other late Anglo-Saxon towers in Lincoln. All that survives is the present nave, which was the chancel of the former church and the chapel to the north built by Robert Tattershall in 1378.

The church's bell known as Old Kate, was cast in 1585 and paid for by the Lincoln barber surgeons company. The church was closed in 1931 and demolition was proposed. However, following a public outcry, the church was saved as the result of an appeal and renovation work undertaken. It was the headquarters of the Lincoln Diocese Mothers' Union but closed in 2018.

In June 2020 it became the base for Lincoln Street Pastors who go out on Saturday and Friday nights to listen, help and care for all those out in the City of Lincoln during the night time economy hours. In April 2022 Unicorn Tree Books moved in to become the Bookshop in St Benedict's when they had to relocate from Lincoln Central Market due to its closure.

== Parish of St Benedict ==
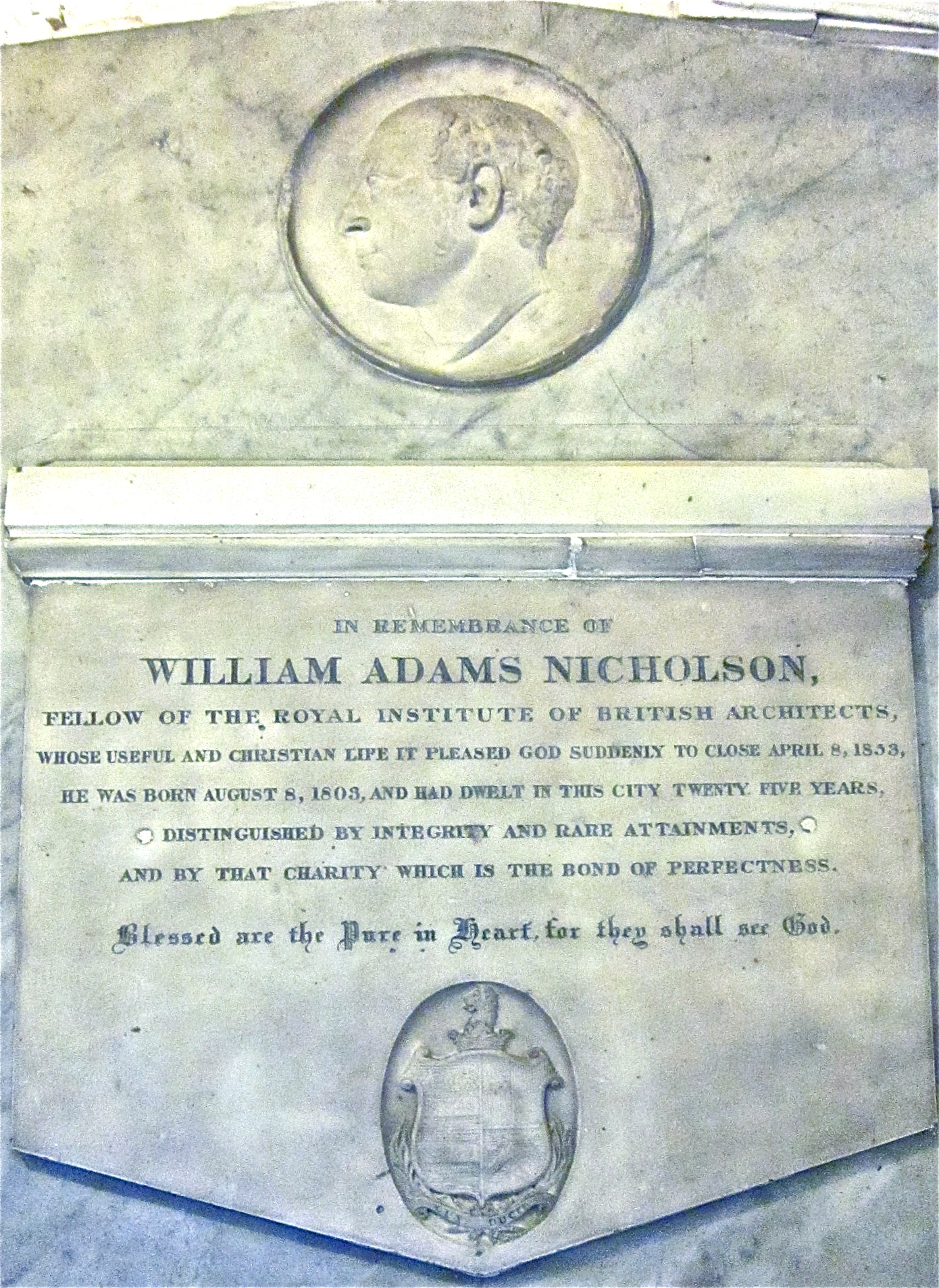
Memorial to William Adams Nicholson, 1853

The parish was one of the smaller parishes in Lincoln. In the general re-organisation of the Lincoln parishes which took place in 1553, part of the parish of St John's was amalgamated with St Benedict's parish. On Padley's large scale map of 1842, the parish is shown as extending from the Brayford Pool on the west to Sincil Street on the east. It included the length of the High Street from just north of the River Witham and the High Bridge to the Cornhill to the south.

=== Furnishings in the church ===
These include a late 17th-century octagonal panelled oak pulpit and an 18th-century eggcup font with swags and square stem. A royal coat of arms of 1734, was repainted in 1819, with the churchwardens' names. A brass with weepers, 1687, scrolled cartouche with arms and cherubs, 1739, and a memorial to the noted Lincoln architect William Adams Nicholson of 1853.

== Gallery ==
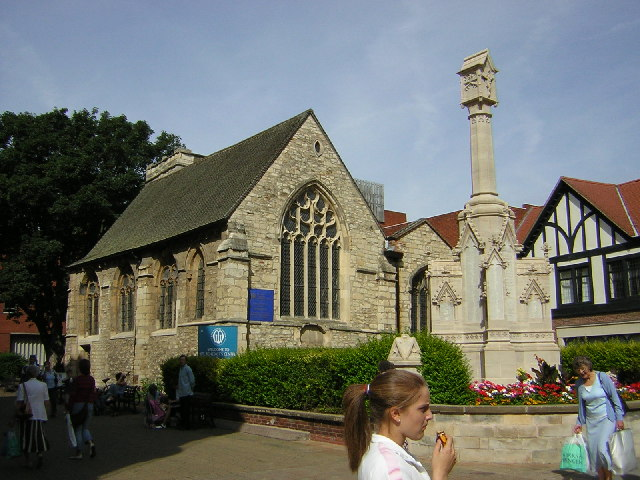
War Memorial and St Benedict's church, High Street, Lincoln

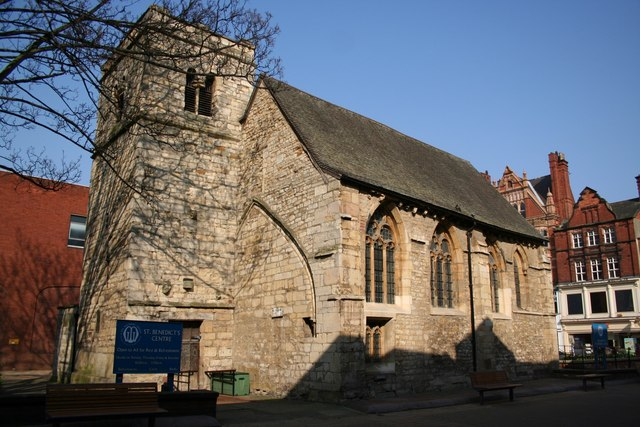
St Benedict's church

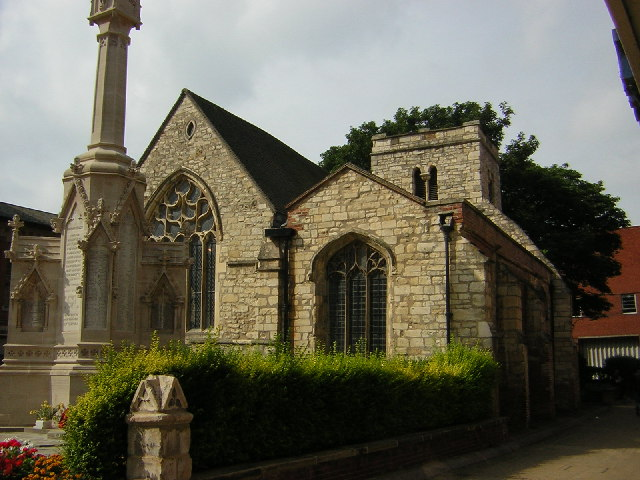
St Benedict's church

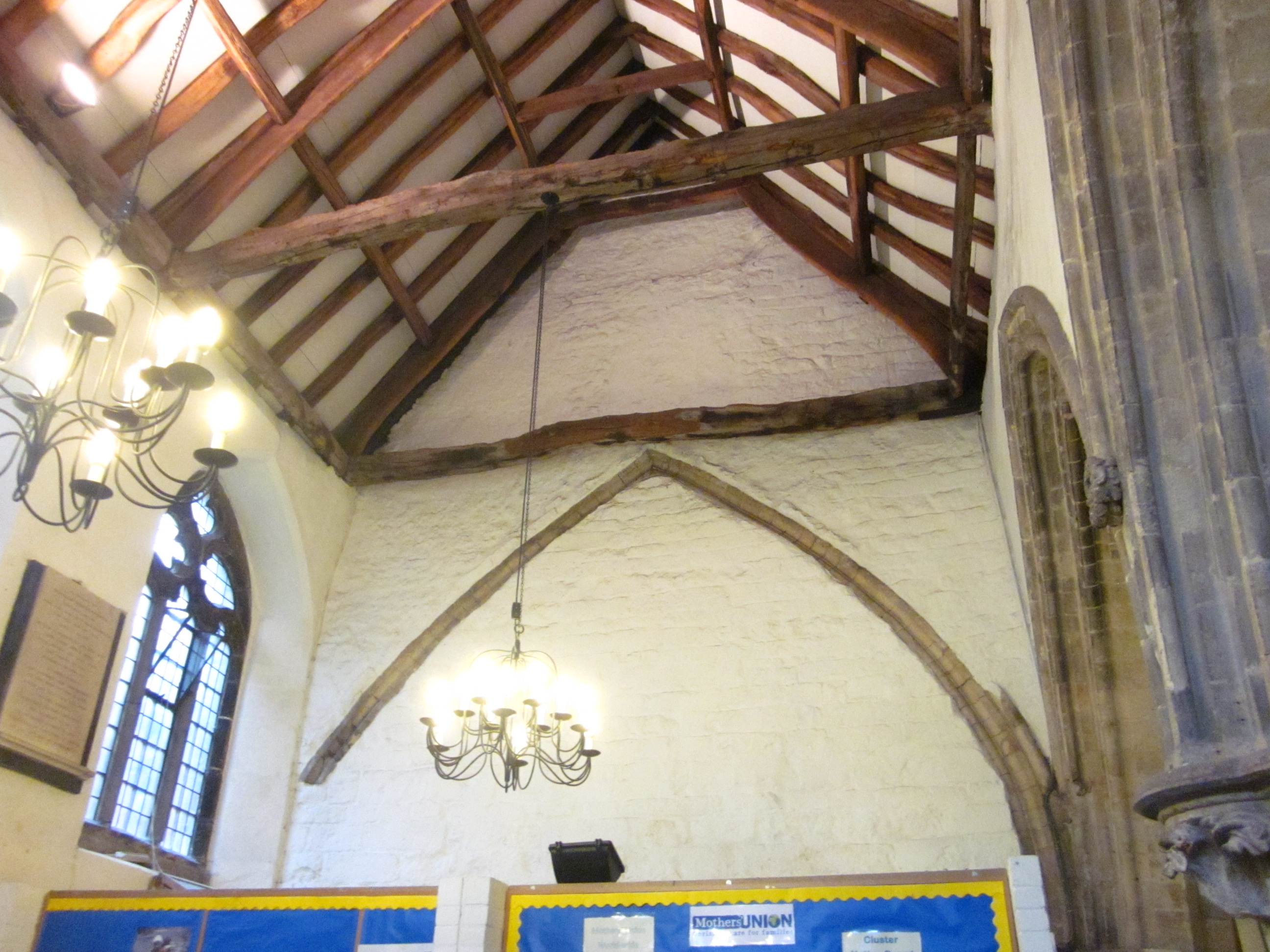
St Benedict's former chancel, now nave to church

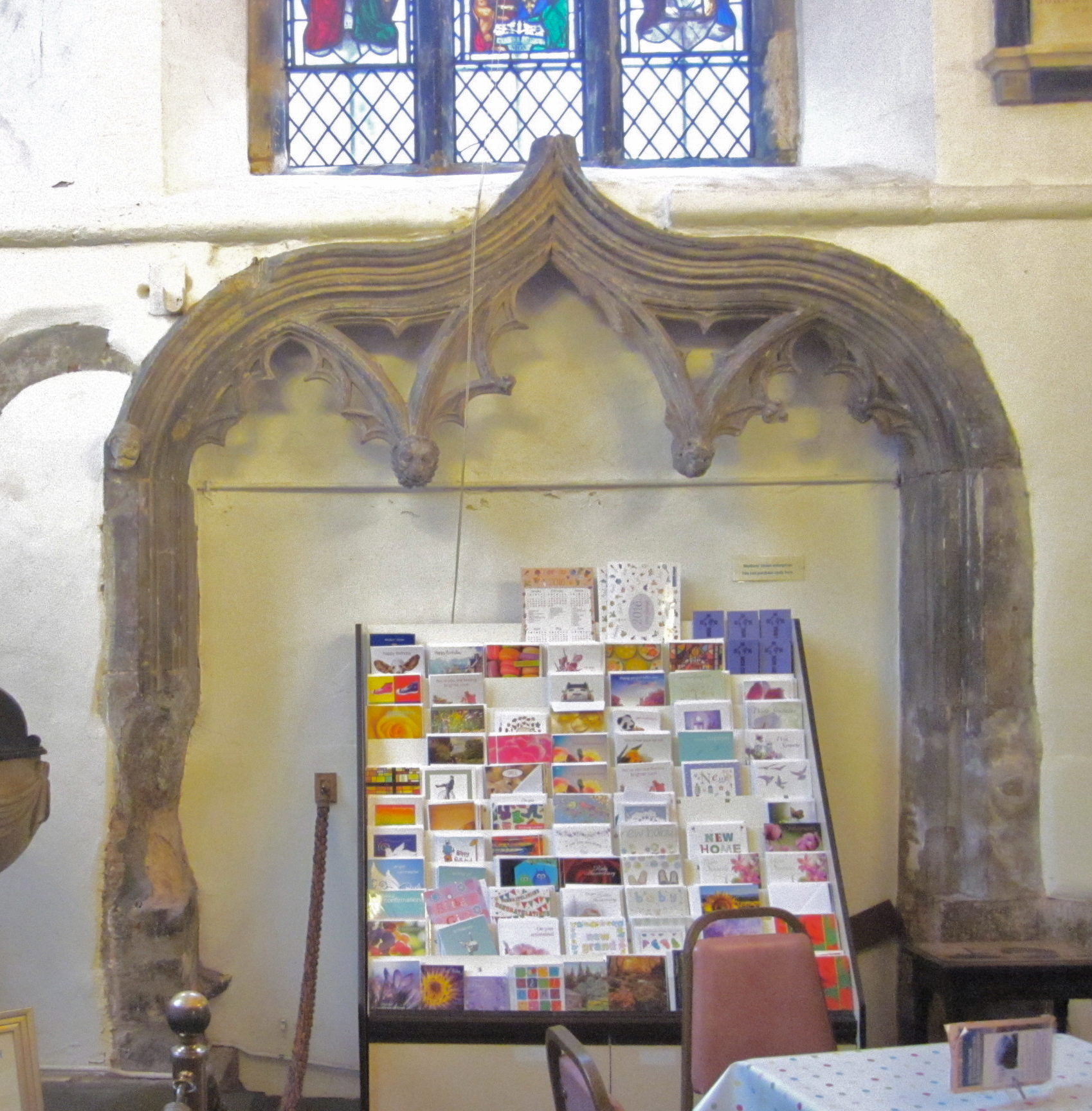
Tomb canopy, St Benedict's Lincoln

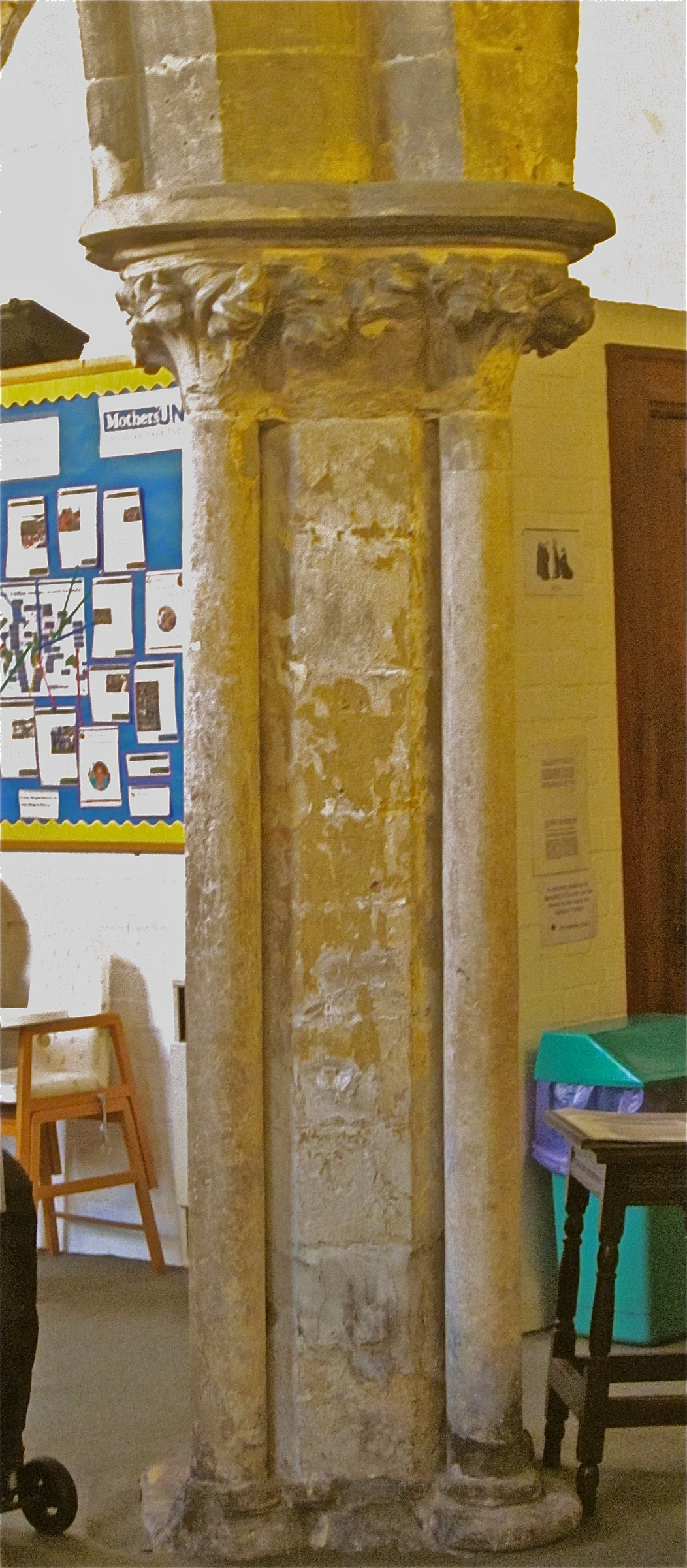
St Benedict's Lincoln. Chancel arcade column with 'stiff leaf' decoration

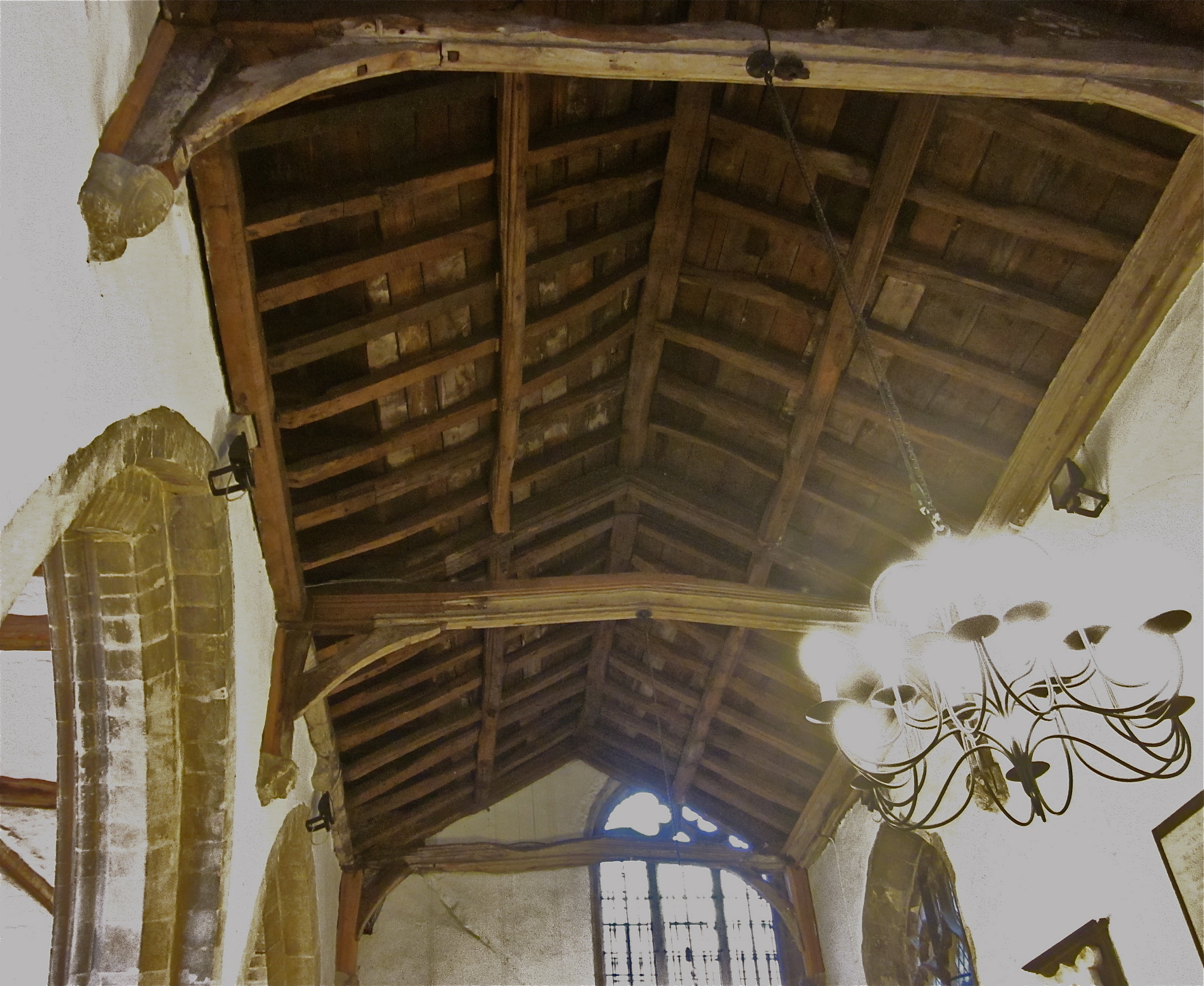
Chapel Roof, St Benedict's Lincoln

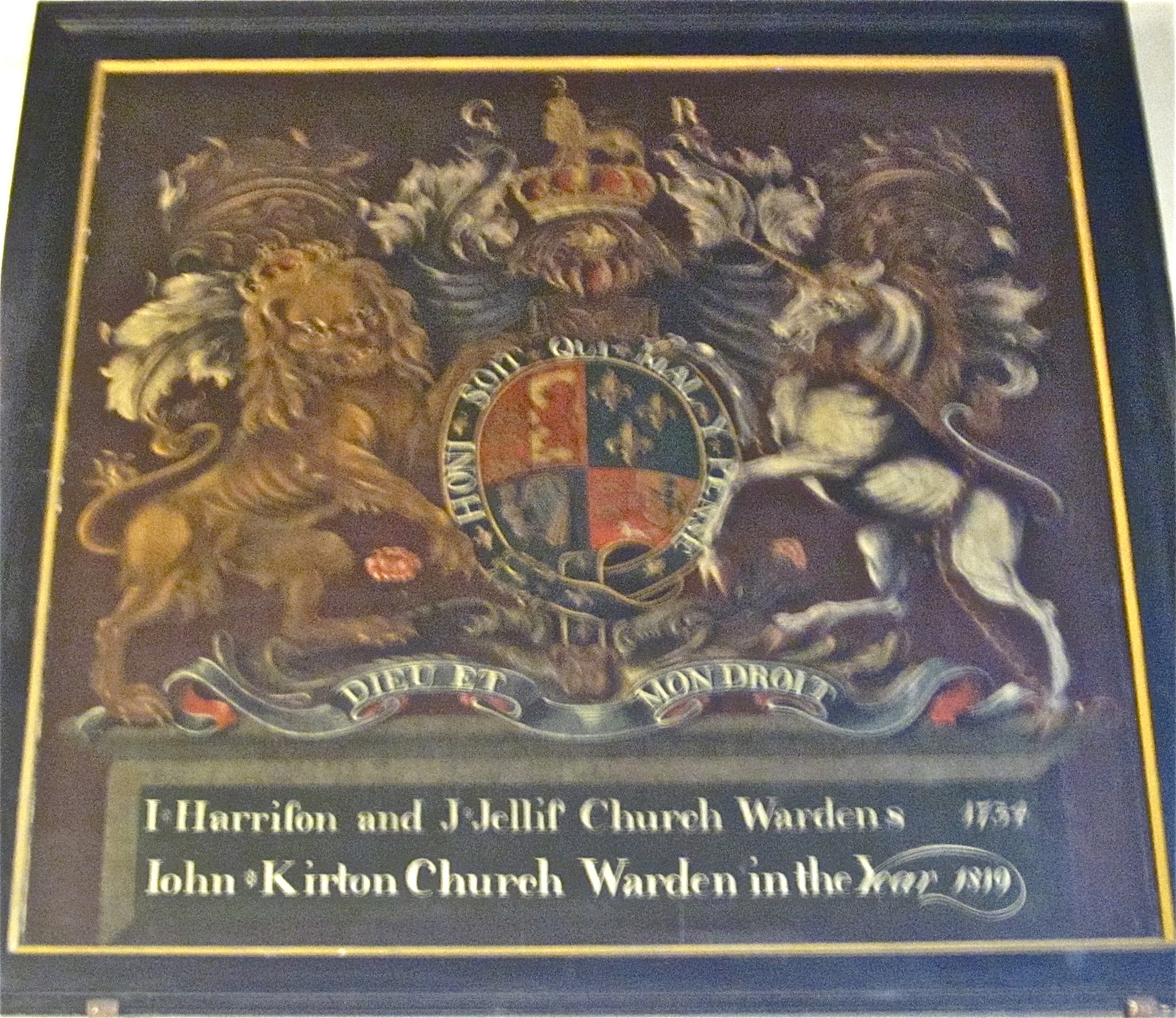
Royal coat of arms

== See also: Churches in Lincoln ==
- St Peter at Gowts
- St Martin's Church, Lincoln
- St Mary le Wigford
- St Peter at Arches Church, Lincoln

== Literature ==
- Antram N. (revised), Pevsner N. & Harris J., (1989), The Buildings of England: Lincolnshire, Yale University Press. pg 496
