= St Peter at Gowts =

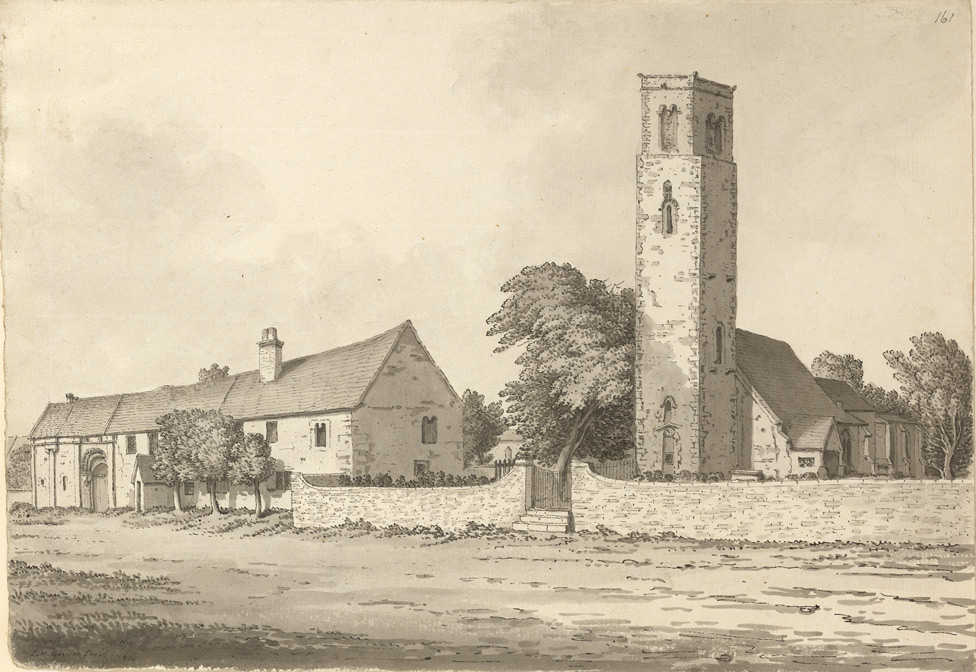
- St Peter at Gowts by Samuel Hieronymus Grimm (1784)
- St Peter at Gowts
- 53.221771°N 0.543833°W
- OS grid reference: SK 97320 70401
- Country: England
- Denomination: Church of England
- Churchmanship: Broad Church
- Website: lincoln.ourchurchweb.org.uk/stpeteratgowts/

Architecture
- Heritage designation: Grade I listed

Administration
- Diocese: Diocese of Lincoln
- Parish: Lincoln

St Peter at Gowts is a Grade I listed parish church in Lincoln, Lincolnshire, England.

== History ==
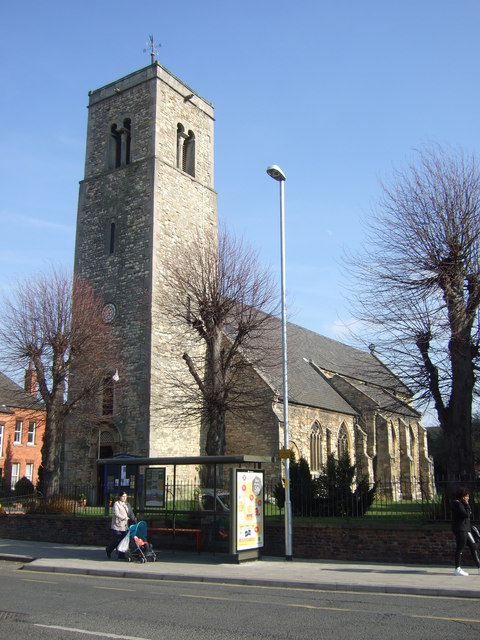
St Peter at Gowts' Church

The church dates from the 11th century. The north aisle and porch were built in 1852 to designs of William Adams Nicholson. The chancel was enlarged in 1887 by C. Hodgson Fowler. A hanging rood was installed in 1920 by Temple Lushington Moore.

In 1968 the Victorian St Andrew's Church, Lincoln was closed and demolished and in 1980 the parish was renamed St Peter at Gowts and St Andrew.

== Bells ==
The bells date from 1872 by the London founders Mears and Stainbank. There are currently restrictions on both practice and ringing, however the university bell ringing society does ring there on occasion.

== Organ ==
The first organ recorded was already in place in 1872, and built by T. H. Nicholson. That was replaced by a different organ, a Bevington, that was moved in 1900 to Tattershall.

In the 1920s a second-hand organ by Nicholson of Worcester was obtained from a private house. In 1949 it was replaced with another organ by Nicholson of Worcester. This had previously been installed at All Souls' Church, Aylestone Road, Leicester. This later instrument retains some parts of the 1920s device.

== See also: Churches in Lincoln ==
- St Martin's Church, Lincoln
- St Mary le Wigford
- St Peter at Arches Church, Lincoln
- St Benedict's Church, Lincoln
