= Ledger stone =

Grave marker

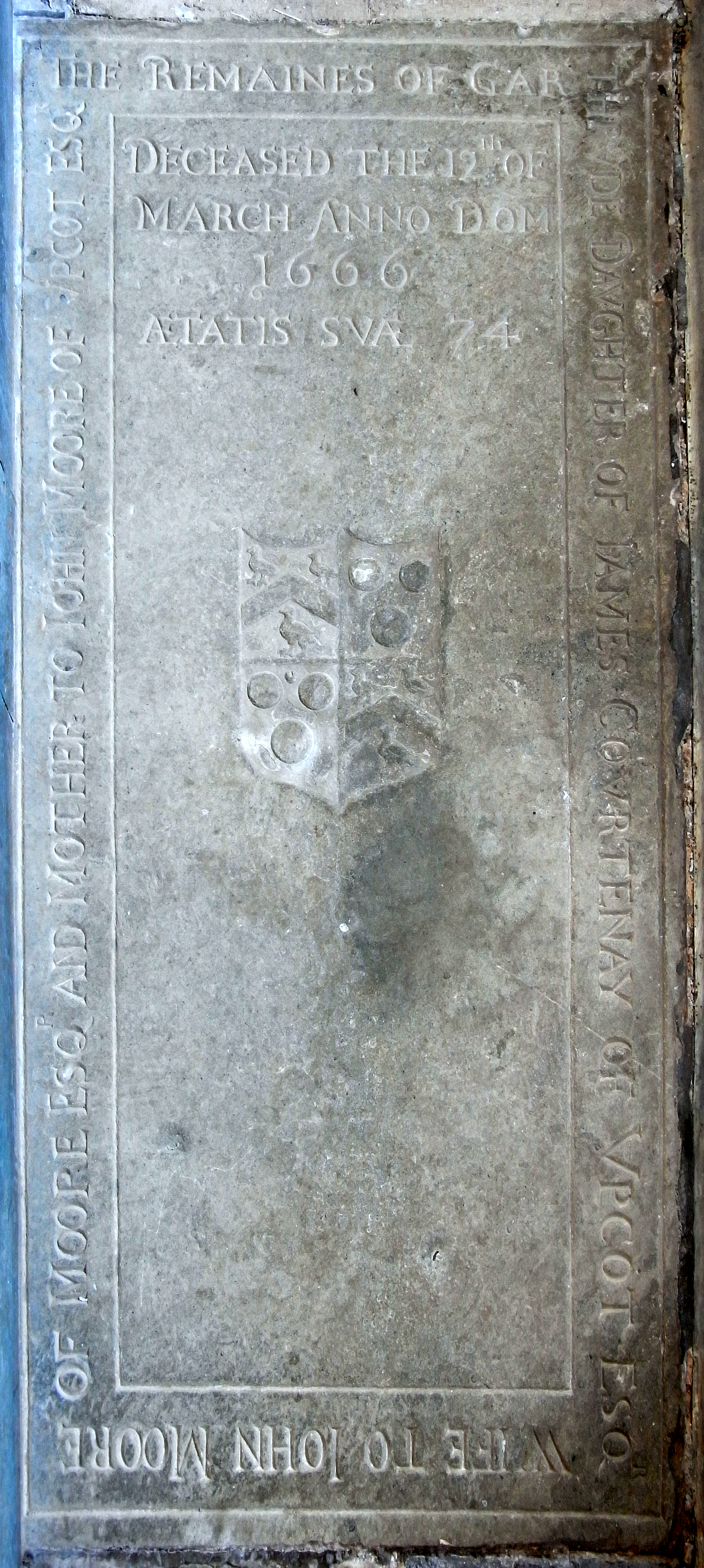
Ledger stone to Gertrude Courtenay (1592–1666) of Upcott, Cheriton Fitzpaine, Devon, in the Upcott Chapel forming the east end of the north aisle of St Matthew's Church, Cheriton Fitzpaine

A ledger stone or ledgerstone is an inscribed stone slab usually laid into the floor of a church to commemorate or mark the place of the burial of a deceased person. The term "ledger" derives from the Middle English words lygger, ligger or leger, themselves derived from the root of the Old English verb liċġan, meaning to lie (down). Ledger stones may also be found as slabs forming the tops of tomb chest monuments.

== Form and geology ==
Ledger stones take the form of an inscribed stone slab, usually laid into the floor of a church to commemorate or mark the place of the burial of an important deceased person. Ledger stones may also be found as slabs forming the tops of chest tombs. An inscription is usually incised into the stone within a ledger line running around the edge of the stone. Such inscription may continue within the central area of the stone, which may be decorated with relief-sculpted or incised coats of arms, or other appropriate decorative items such as skulls, hour-glasses, etc. Stones with inset brasses first appeared in the 13th century.

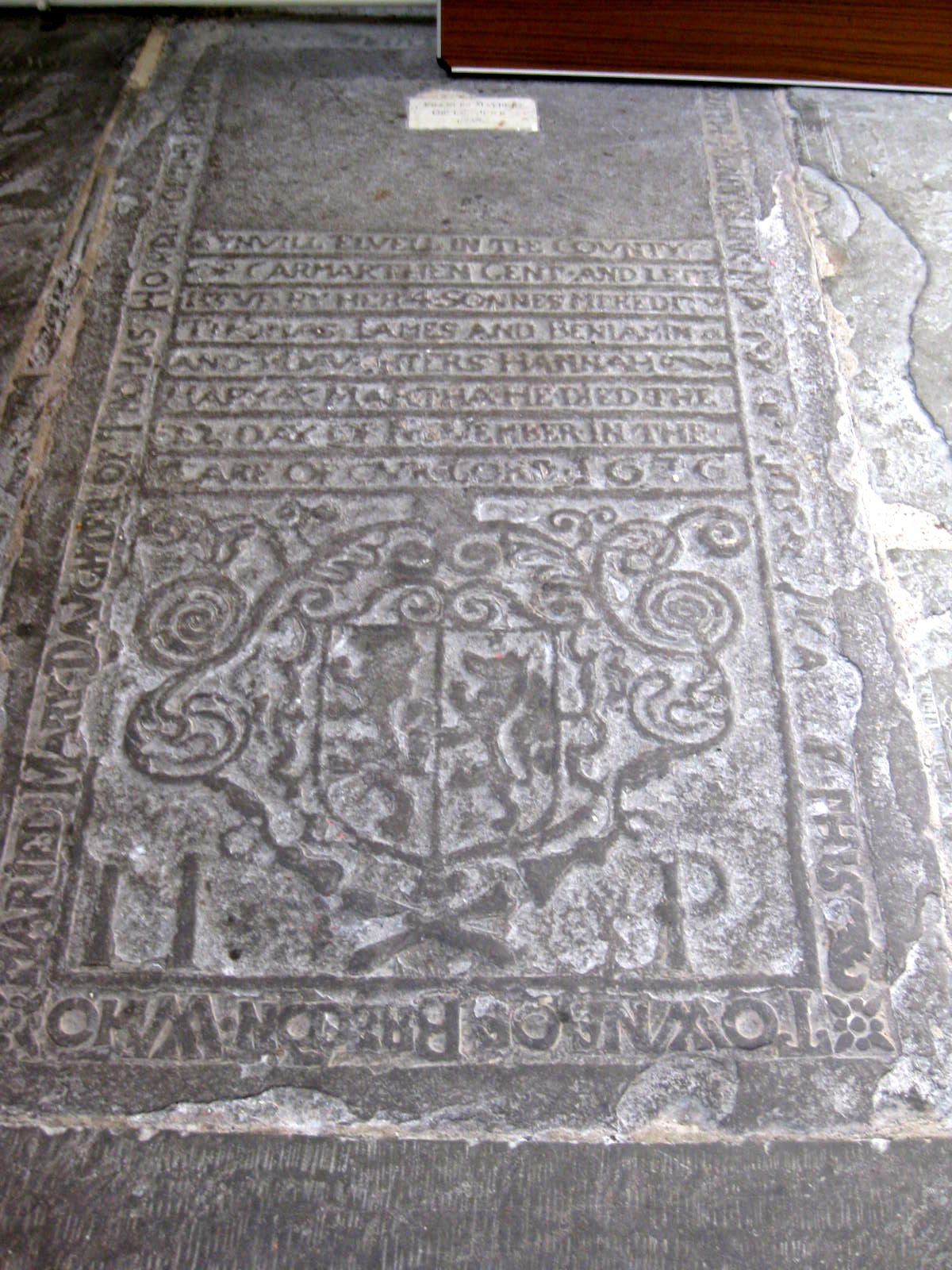
Ledger stone in Brecon Cathedral, 1676

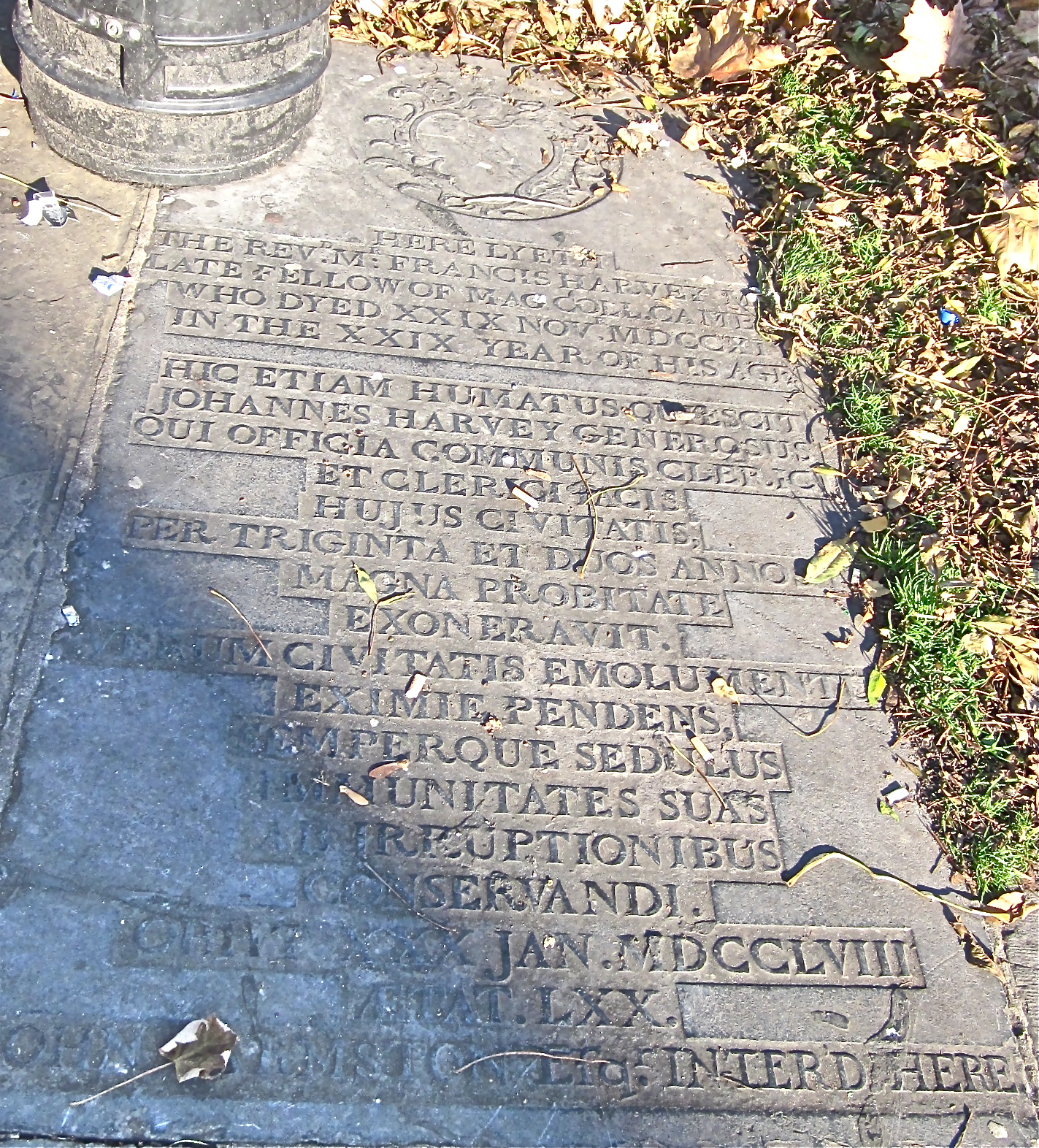
Grave slab at St Martin's Church, Lincoln, recording burials in 1711 and 1758

=== Stones with cameo lettering in a cartouche ===
This is a regional style of lettering that occurs in Brecknockshire and in Lincoln and in Humberside in the United Kingdom. The style where the lettering and armorial are raised in cameo and the lettering set in a border or cartouche may indicate a local workshop. These slabs occur during a period from about 1630 to 1740. In Breconshire, these slabs might be connected to the Brute family of stonemasons who lived at Llanbedr Ystrad Yw, Breconshire. Similarly lettered ledger slabs of black marble occur in Lincoln Cathedral and in St Martin's churchyard Lincoln, possibly indicating a local workshop. Neave illustrates another ledger slab of this type of 1718 in Holy Trinity Church, Hull, and indicates that other examples exist in the East Riding of Yorkshire.

=== Tournai and Black Belgian marbles ===
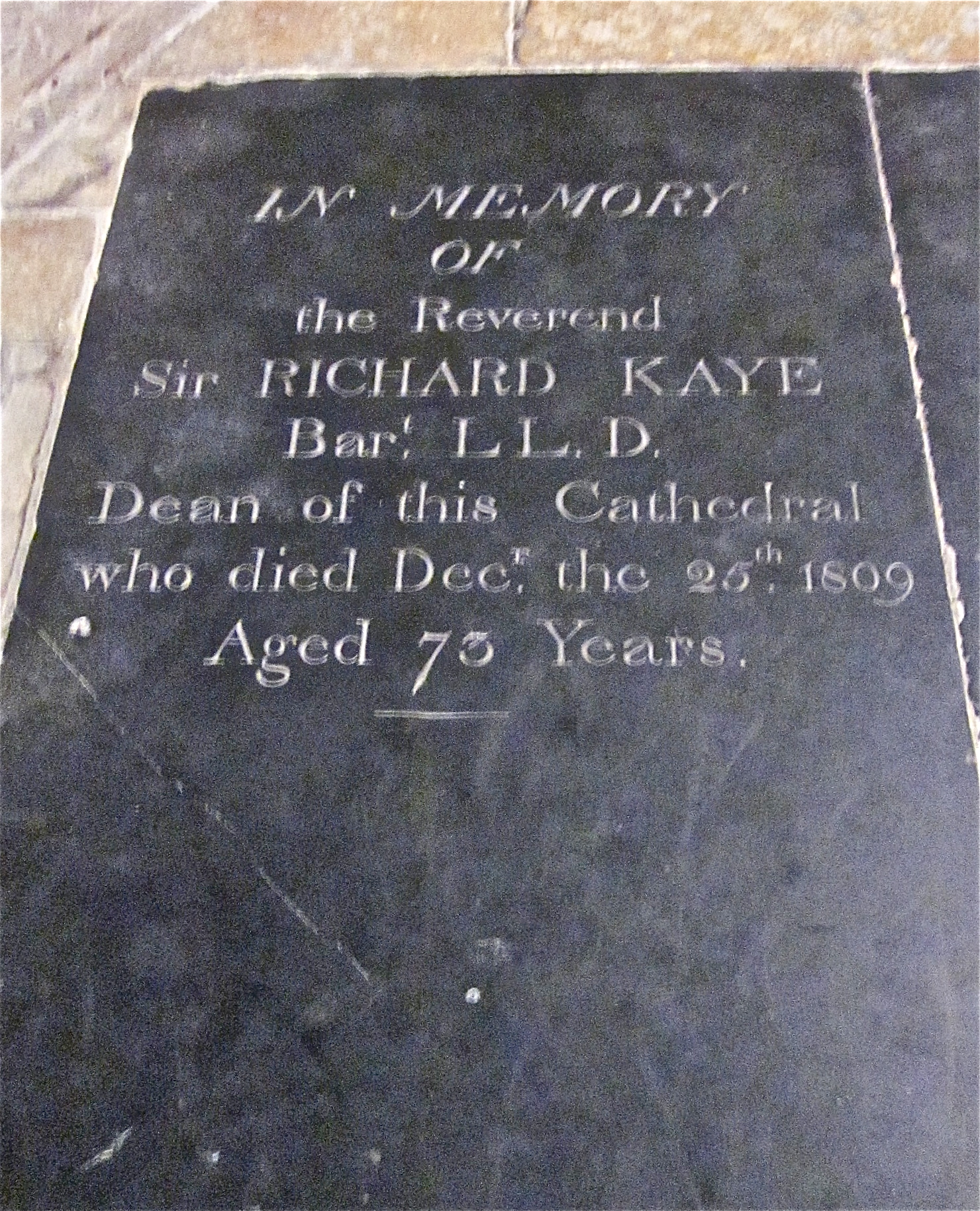
Grave of Sir Richard Kaye in Lincoln Cathedral

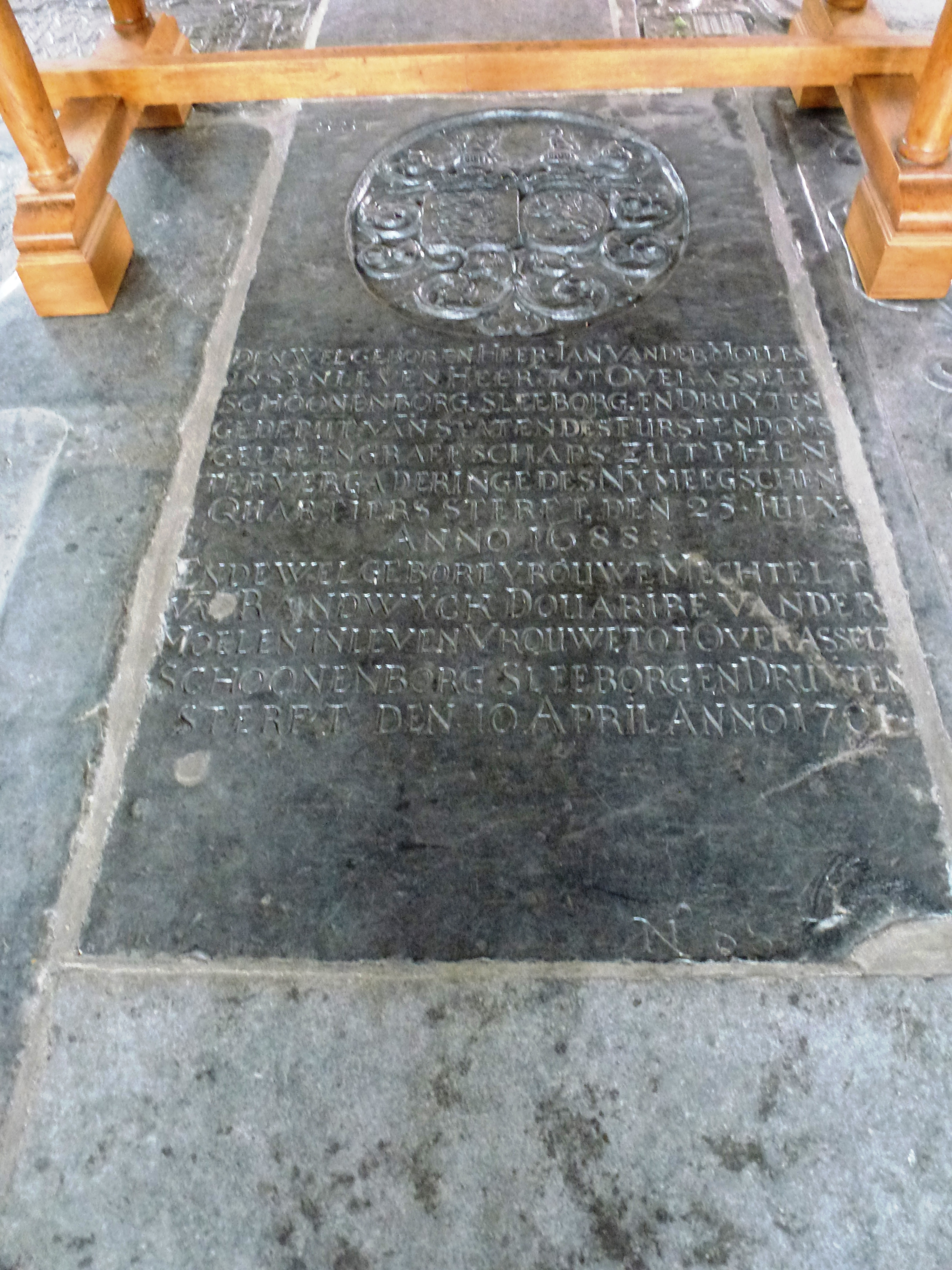
Ledger stone from St Stevenskerk, Nijmegen (1668/1701). Heren van Overasselt

Rocks from the Tournai area date from the Carboniferous Period and have been used to define the Tournaisian Age, a subdivision of the Carboniferous lasting from 359 to 345 million years ago. Tournai stone is a dark limestone which takes a polish and was used particularly in the Romanesque period for sculpted items such as Tournai fonts. It is sometimes called Tournai marble, though this is geologically inaccurate. These marbles are found over a large area of central Belgium and normally have white inclusions and fossils in them, but there is also the Nero Belgio which is almost jet black in appearance and come from quarries that are still operating at Golzinne and Mazy. It is noticeable that an almost jet black marble, similar to Nero Belgio occurs as ledger slabs in the latter part of the 18th and early 19th centuries, an example being Dean Kaye's memorial in Lincoln Cathedral. Many other black ledger stones of the 17th to 19th centuries have white flecking, which may also suggest that they come from Belgian sources. Neave notes references in the Hull port books in the 17th and 18th centuries to the importation of ledger stones, and draws comparisons between those in churches in Humberside and those in St Bavokerk's church in Haarlem. Some of the closest examples of ledgerstones come from the St Stevenskerk, Nijmegen, but the Dutch examples normally use upper case lettering for the inscriptions. In a survey of heraldic ledger stones in Kent churches made by N. E. Toke in 1929 a specimen of a stone was sent to Dr. H. Thomas of the Geological Museum who reported "the stone to be a black limestone of carboniferous age … which comes principally from Belgium…. It is probable that these monumental slabs were imported from Belgium in the same way as plates of 'latten' (laiton) had been in the era of brasses. This would account for their prevalence in Kent and East Anglia, for the transport of these heavy stones would be easier and cheaper".

=== Sussex Marble or Petworth Marble ===
Sussex Marble is a fossiliferous freshwater limestone material which is prevalent in the Weald Clay of parts of Kent, East Sussex and West Sussex in South East England. It is also called "Petworth Marble", "Bethersden Marble" or "Laughton Stone" in relation to villages where it was quarried, and another alternative name is "winklestone". It is referred to as "marble" as it polishes very well, although it is not a true marble, geologically speaking, as it has not been subject to metamorphism. The matrix is made up of the shells of freshwater gastropods and viviparus winkles, similar to but larger than those making Purbeck Marble. There are a number of fonts made from this material and it was also used for ledger slabs in the medieval period and as a matrix stone for monumental brasses. It is very possible that it continued to be used for later ledger slabs.

=== Alabaster ===
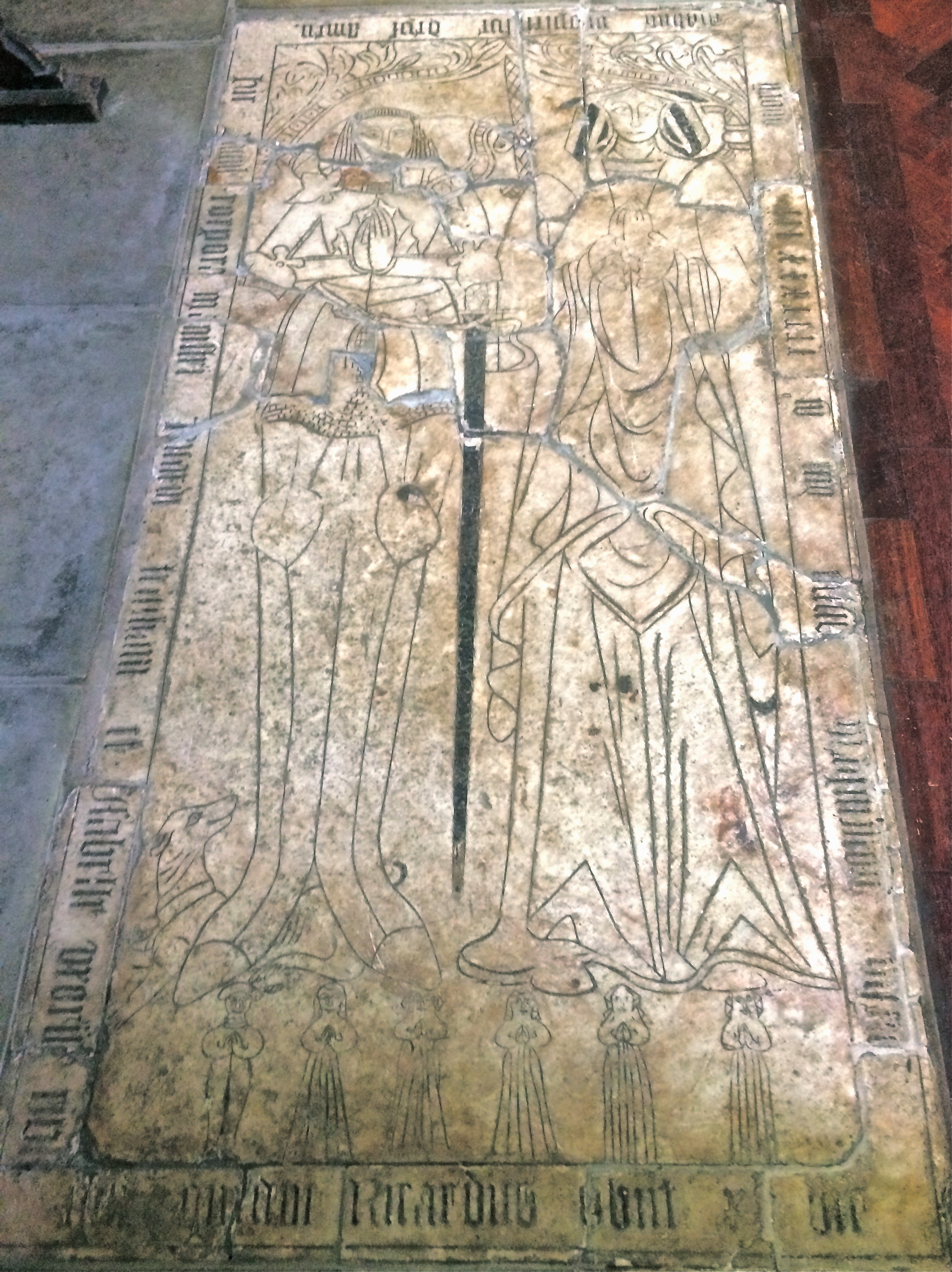
St Mary Magdalene, Geddington, Northamptonshire, monument to Richard and Isabel Tresham, 1433

Alabaster is well known for its use for church monuments with tomb effigies, but also on occasions for ledger slabs. These occur in the East Midland counties of Leicestershire, Derbyshire and Nottinghamshire, with four outlying examples in Lincolnshire.

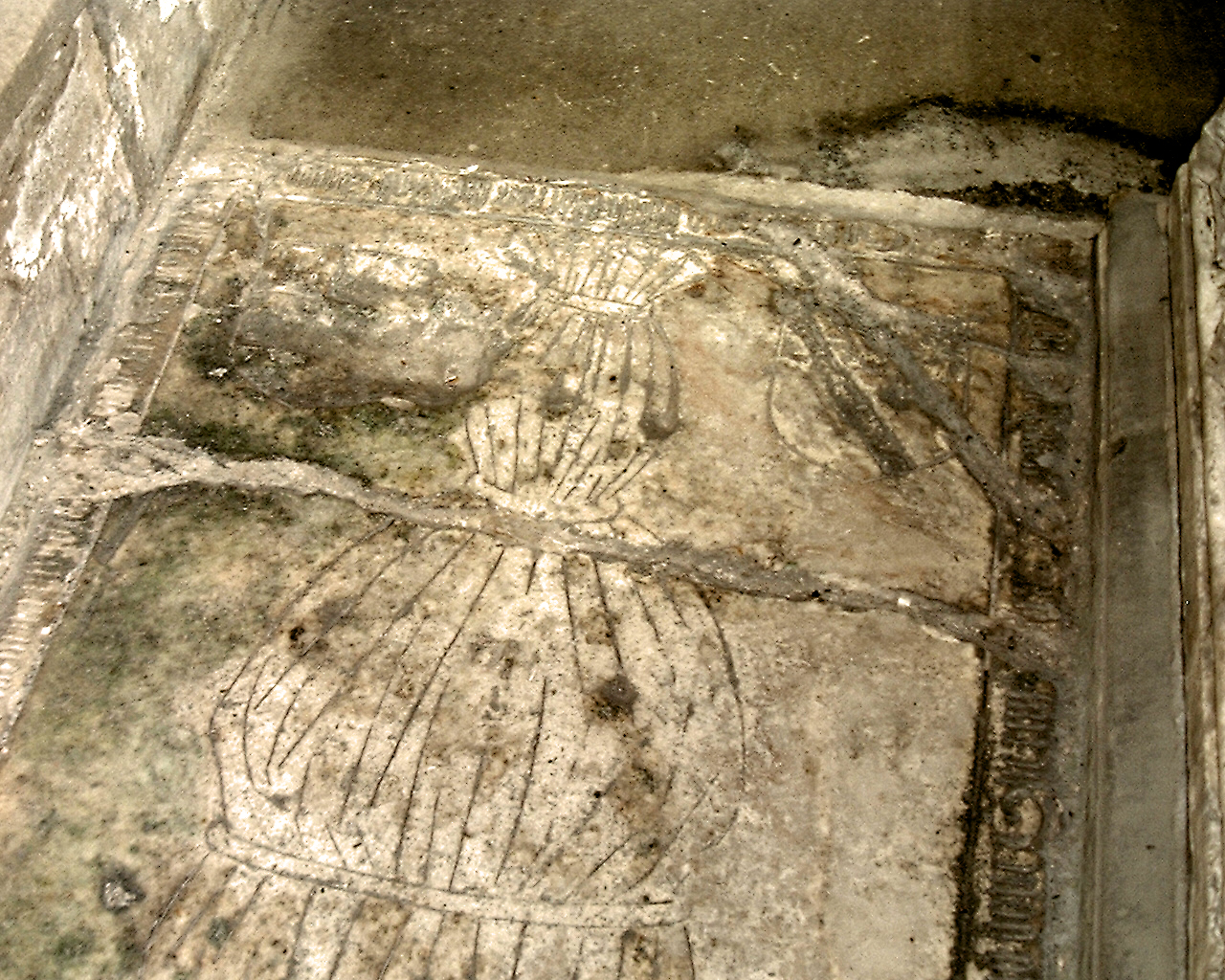
Shroud monument, Norbury, Derbyshire

Examples date mainly from the 14th and 15th centuries, with incised figures. An exceptional example of an alabaster ledger slab is that of Richard and Isabel Tresham in Geddington Church in Northamptonshire (shown at left), dated 1433. The sword in the slab is inlaid with a blueish-greenish stone as is also Isabel's headdress. Richard is shown with a dog beneath his feet, and below the couple are their six children, five daughters and a son.

=== Swithland Slate ===
Swithland slate was widely used for ledger and gravestones in many areas of the East Midlands from the mid-18th century until the 1890s when the last quarries closed. Unlike the black marbles it resists the weather better and can be used both inside churches and outside in graveyards. Swithland lies to the north of Leicester and most of the quarrying activity took place in the 18th and 19th centuries, when the principal slate quarries were at Swithland Wood, The Brand, Groby and Woodhouse Eaves. The two landowners with slate resources on their estates were the Herrick family of Beaumanor Hall, Old Woodhouse and the Earl of Stamford at Groby and Swithland It is noted that the Hind family were leasing the Groby quarry from 1766 and their name often occurs on ledgerstones and gravestones. Their distinctive decorative carving makes it easy to recognise work coming from their workshop. Their work can be recognised in Leicestershire and adjacent areas of Staffordshire. Swithland slate was also transported into south-west Lincolnshire by the Grantham Canal and occurs in churches and churchyards around Grantham.

==== Swithland Slate Ledger stones ====
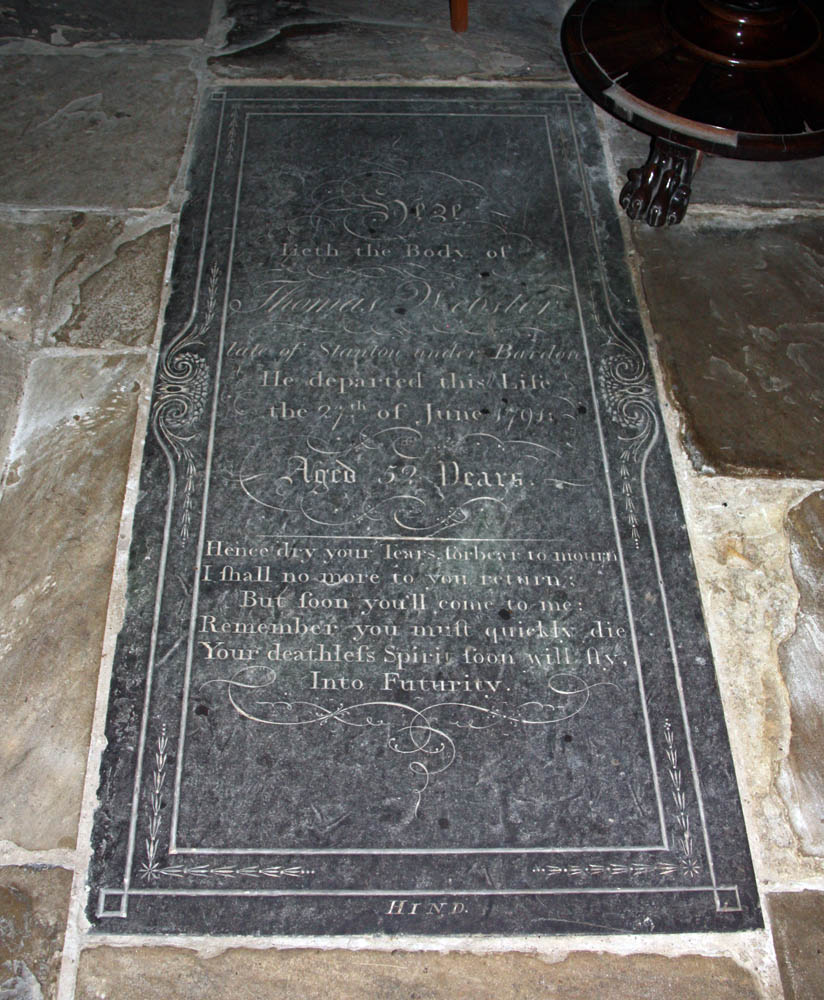
St Peter's, Thornton, Leicestershire – Ledger slab in Swithland slate of 1791, signed Hind.

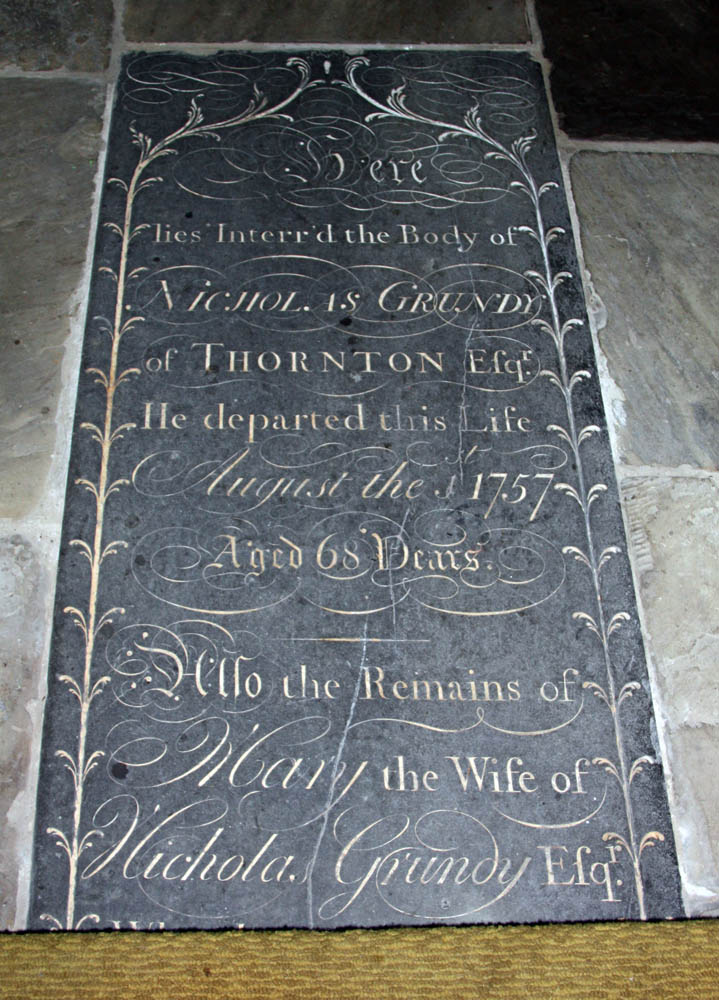
St Peter's, Thornton – Ledger slab in Swithland slate, late 18th century

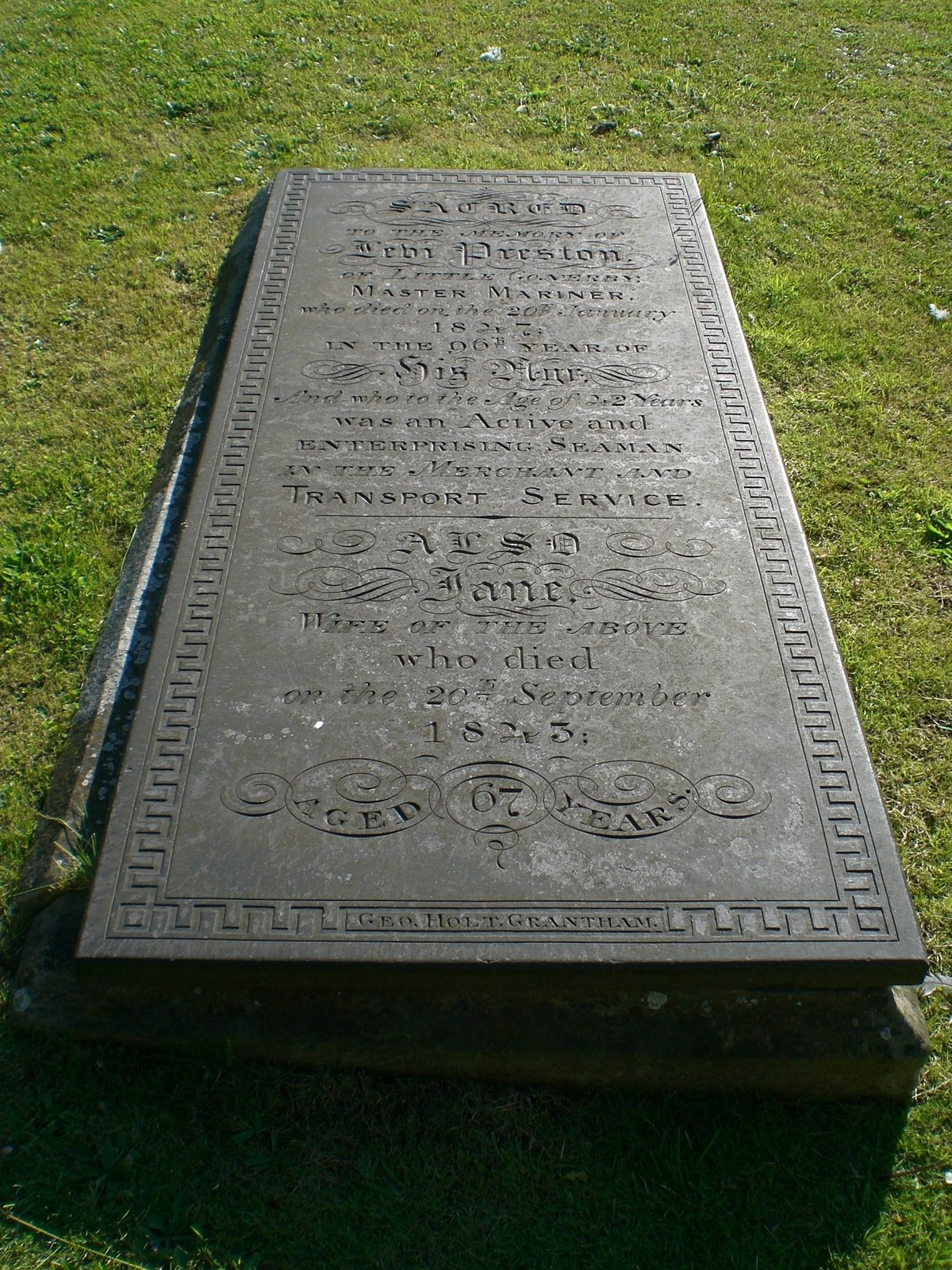
Slate tomb-slab, St Wulfram's Church, Grantham, Lincolnshire. Swithland slate by George Holt

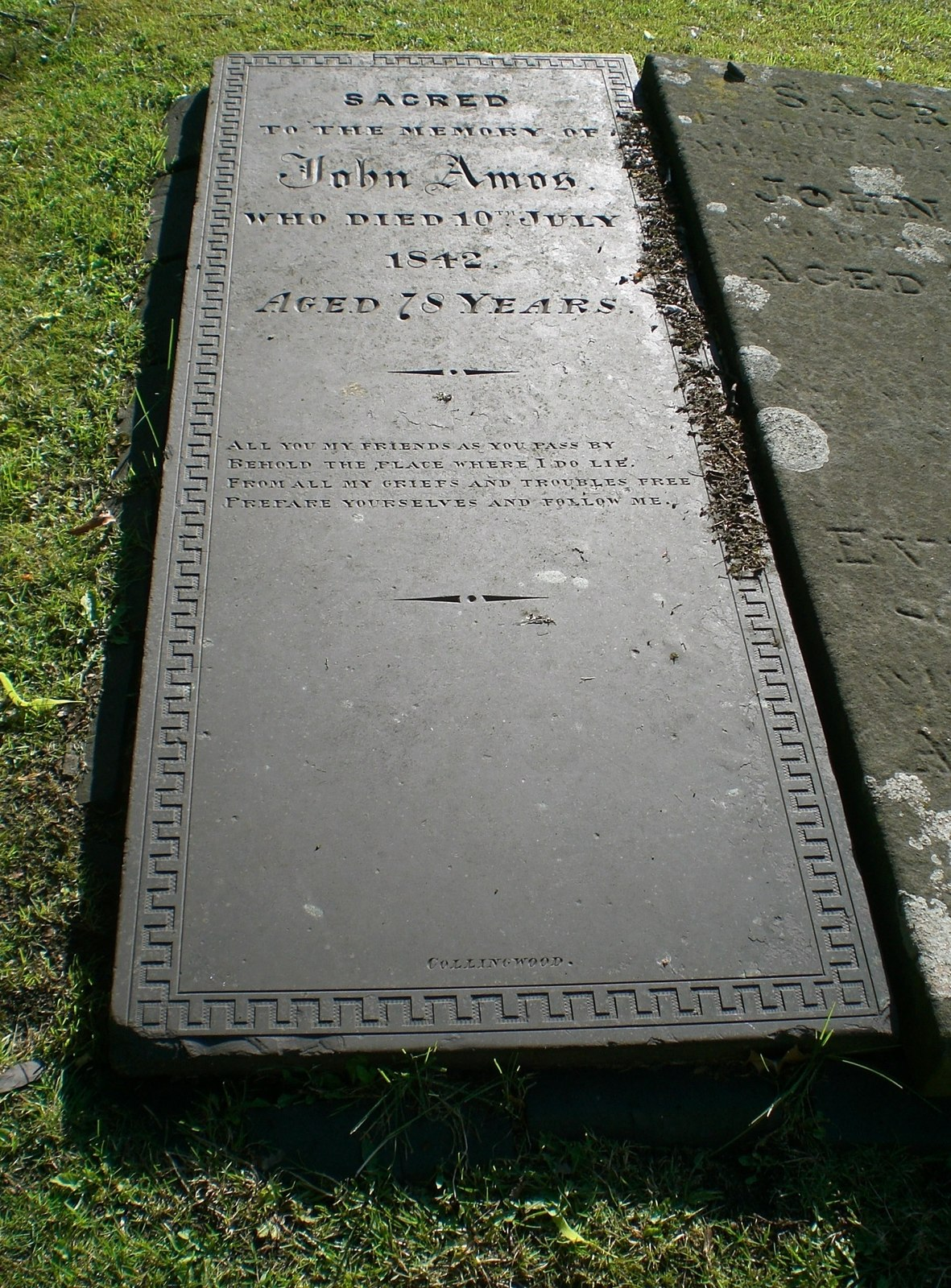
Swithland slate tomb-slab, St Wulfram's churchyard Grantham, by Collingwood 1842

== Use in Britain ==
Many British parish churches contain ledger stones. Over 250,000 stones survive, mostly from the late seventeenth to the late eighteenth centuries, after which period they are rarer. Since the modern era when burials within church buildings have been discontinued for reasons of health and hygiene, the ledger stone is no longer commonly used, and its function has been taken by the upright inscribed grave stone erected in the church-yard or purpose-made cemetery.

Ledger stones were favoured by the British middle classes as they were cheaper than a more elaborate monument. They were frequently laid down by the family of the lord of the manor or holder of the advowson of the parish in question, and such family often had its own private chapel within the parish church, often at the east end of the north aisle, where the manorial pew was situated and where members of the family were buried.

=== Entitlement to use ===
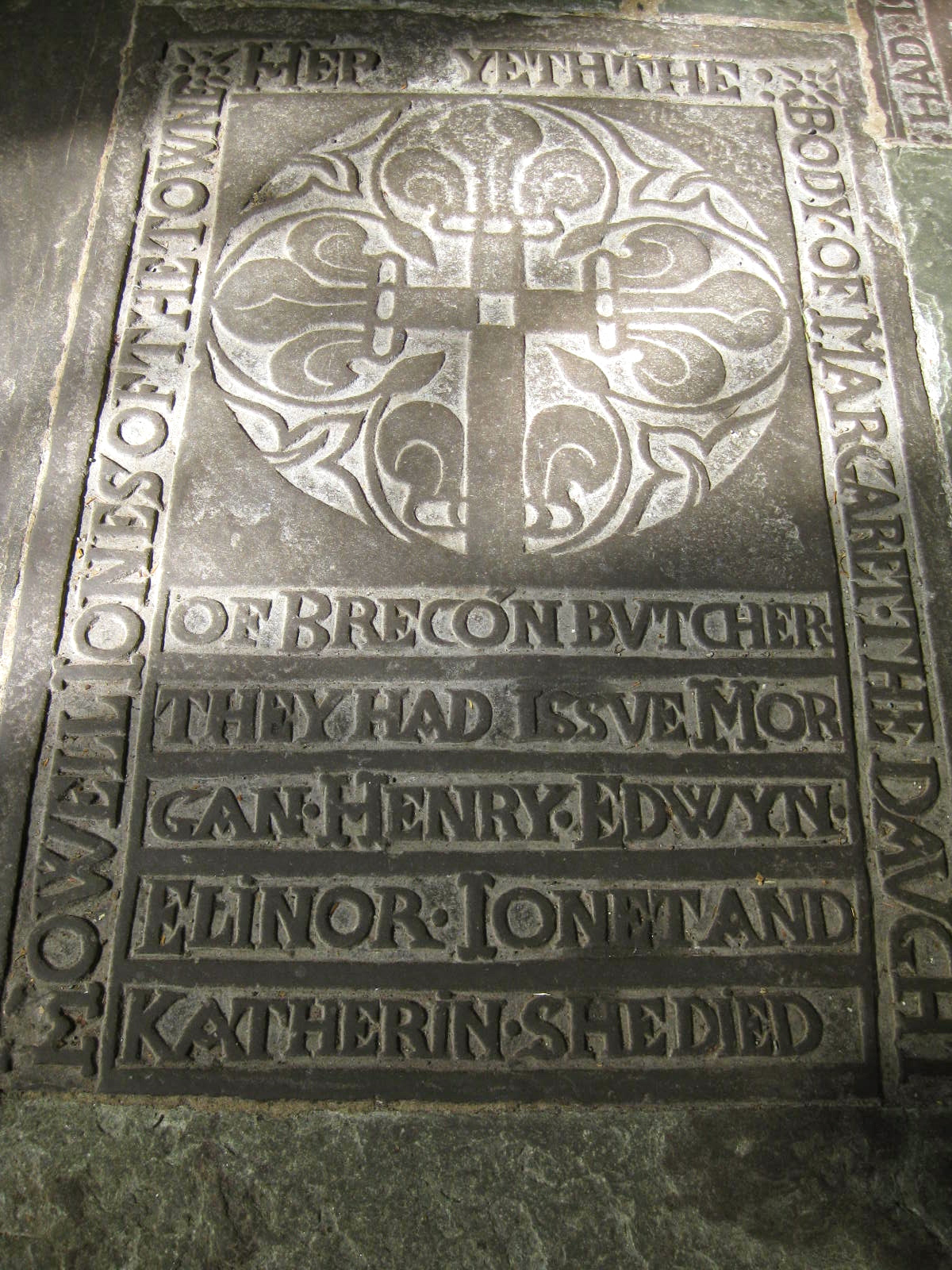
Ledger slab to a butcher in Brecon Cathedral.

It is unclear as to what criteria were needed to qualify a deceased person to be buried within a church (rather than in the churchyard outside) or to merit a ledger stone. Examples of ledger stones range from the aristocracy, country gentry, the professions, clergy to merchants and tradesmen. At Tattershall in Lincolnshire there is a slab to the local apothecary and surgeon with an inscription under a skull and crossbones. A late 17th-century slab in Brecon Cathedral records a local butcher. It is noticeable that the inscriptions for many clergy and some gentry were inscribed in Latin, but this largely disappears by about 1740.

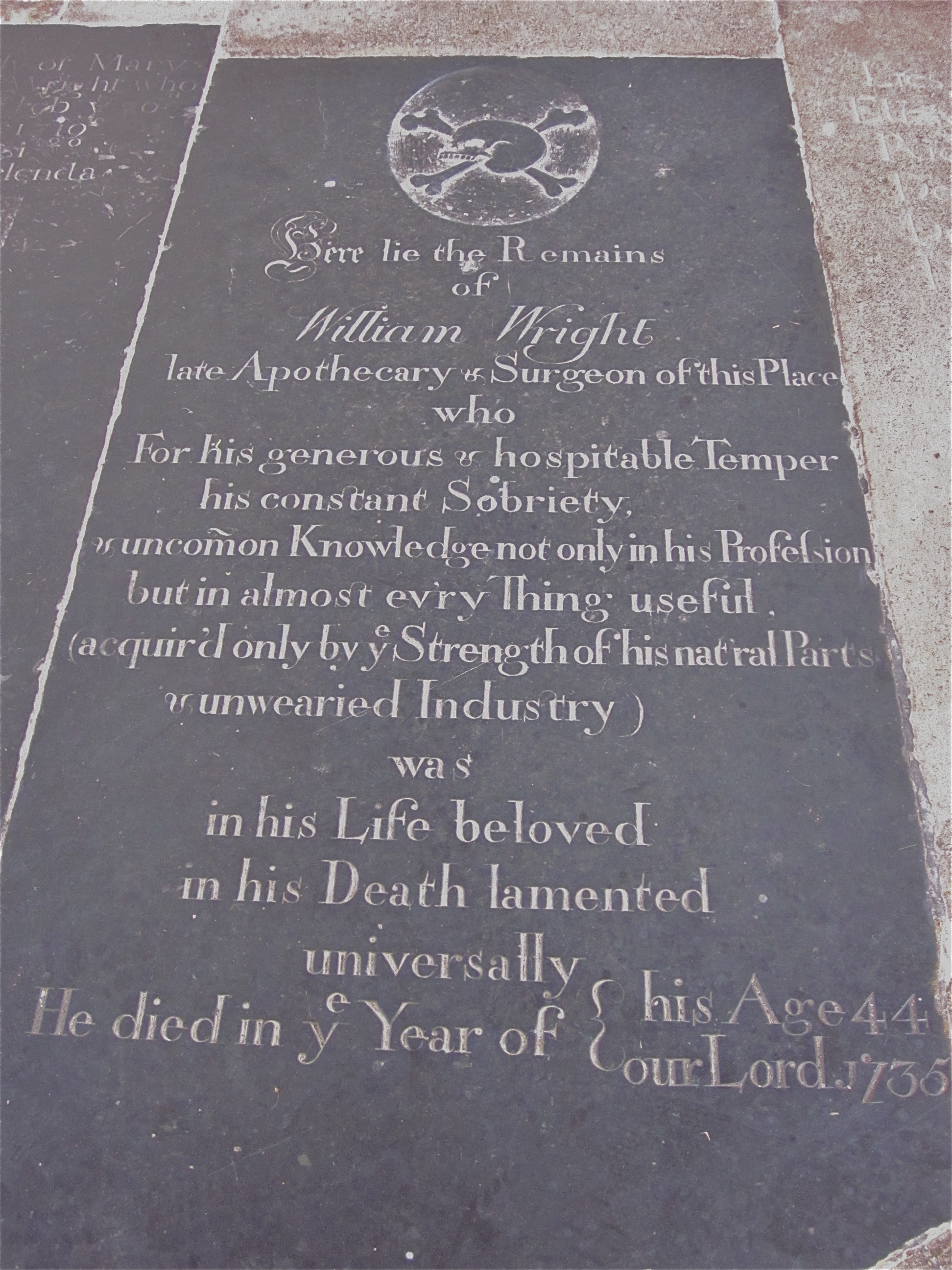
Ledger slab in Holy Trinity, Tattershall, Lincolnshire, to an apothecary and surgeon

A ledger stone in St Nectan's Church, Hartland, Devon, to Thomas Docton (d.1618) of Docton, bore originally a "quaint" epitaph which is oft-quoted, for example in Epitaphs for Country Churchyards by Augustus John Cuthbert Hare. It begins "Rejoice not over me, oh my enemie", but was originally surrounded by a brass ledger line inscribed with the following verse:

Here l lie outside the chancel door;
Here I lie because I'm poor:
The further in, the more they pay;
But here I lie as warm as they.

== Use in continental Europe ==
Ledger stones with engraved or relief figures of the deceased are not very common in the UK, but are more widely used in Germanic and Scandinavian countries. In German the word Grabplatte (literally "grave panel") is used for flat slabs but can also refer to slabs vertically attached on walls of churches and graveyards, and often to plain stone panels covering graves in cemeteries as well. The French term is dalle funéraire.

== Preservation ==
Because they are floor coverings, ledger stones are vulnerable to wear from foot traffic and damage from structural alterations to churches. The Ledgerstones Survey of England & Wales exists to record the information on the stones before it is lost.

== Gallery ==
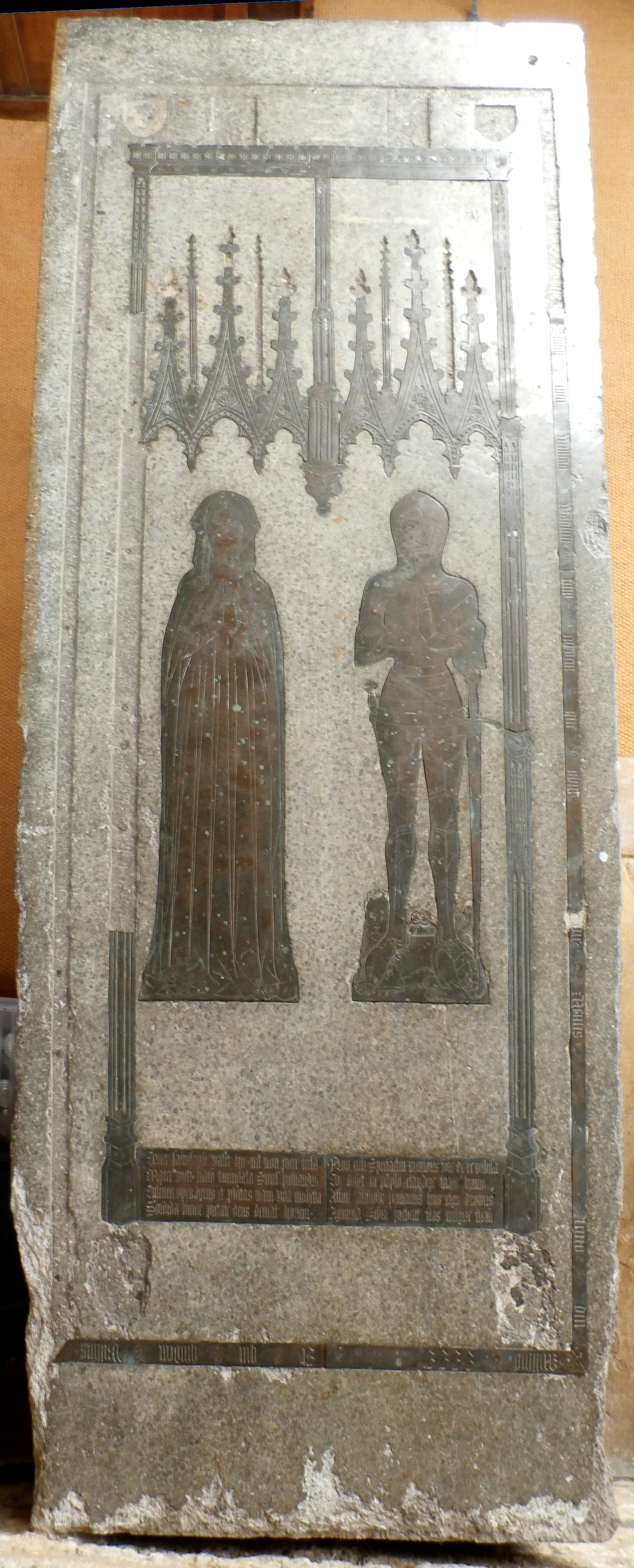
Ledger stone to William Wadham (died 1452) St Mary's Church, Ilminster, Somerset. On a chest tomb with inlaid brass fillet ledger line and monumental brasses.

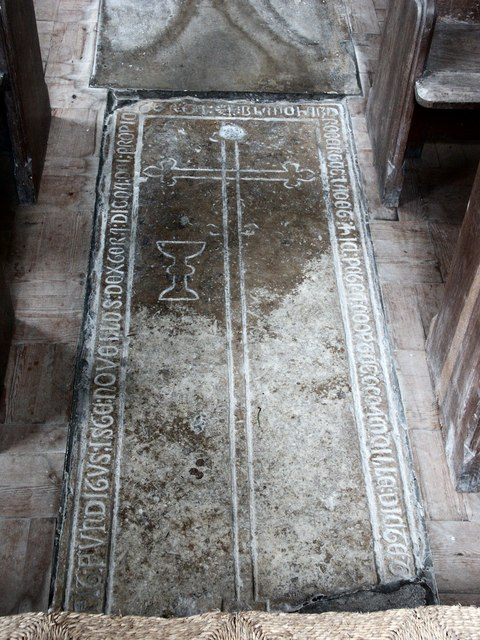
Ledger stone All Hallows', Clixby, Lincolnshire

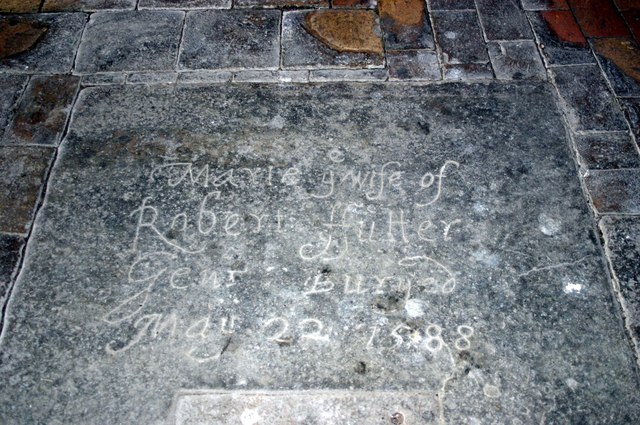
1588 Grave Cover in the Nave of St Martin's, Thompson, Norfolk

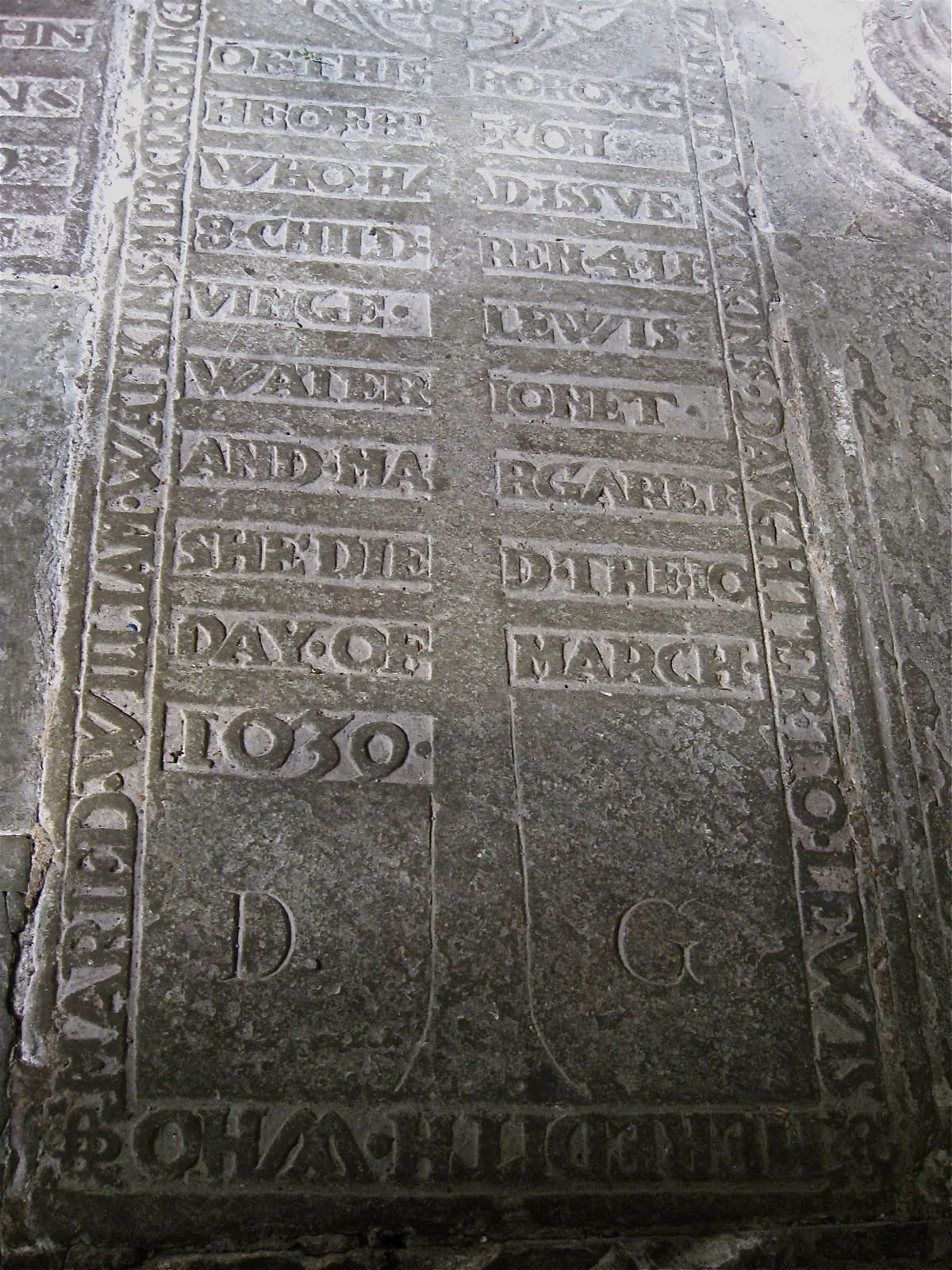
1630. Ledger Slab in Brecon Cathedral.

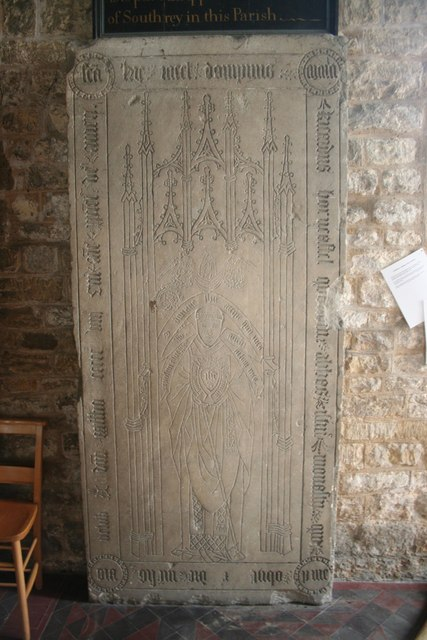
Abbot Richard Horncastle in Bardney Church, Lincolnshire.

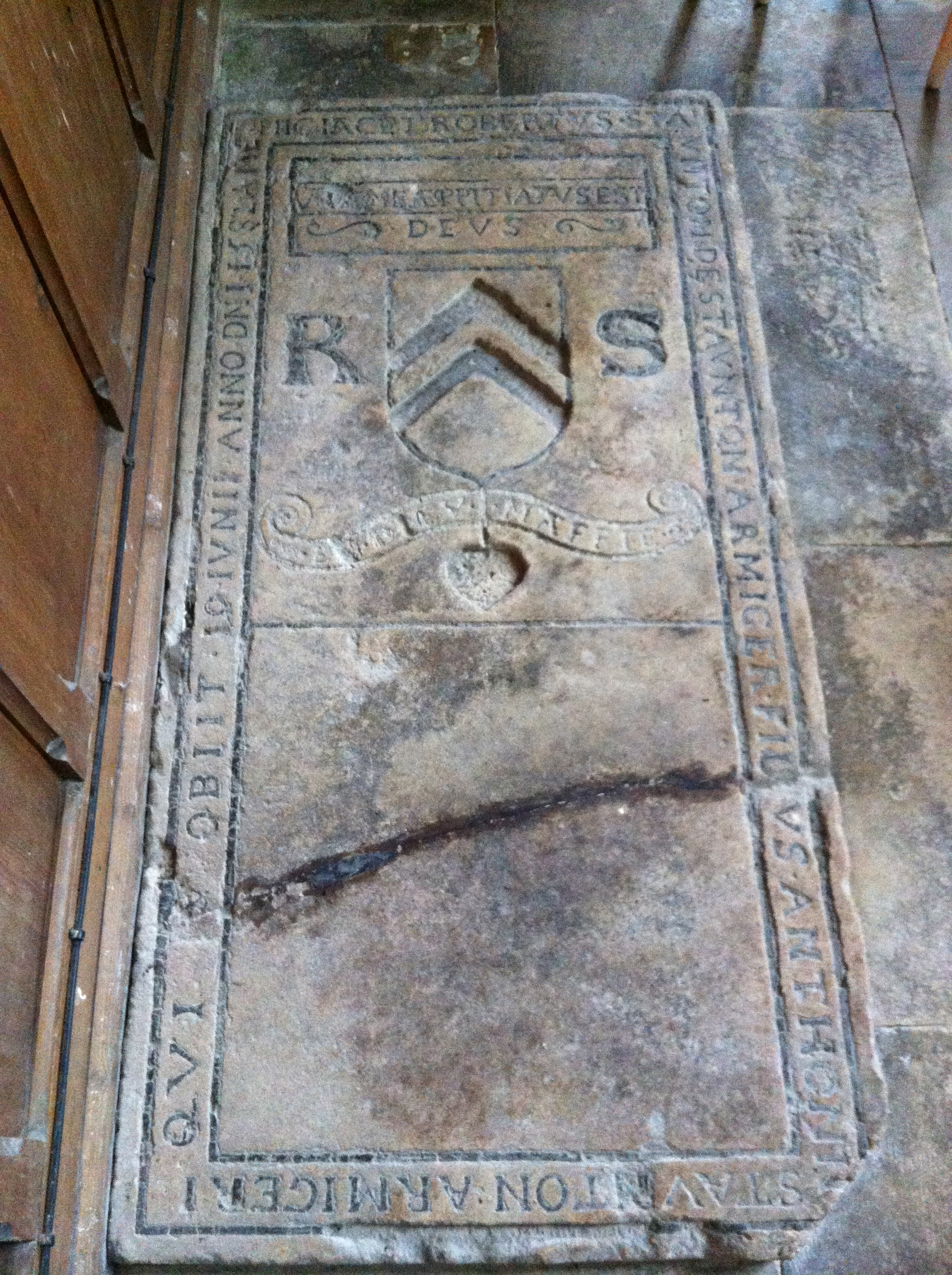
Memorials at St Mary's Church, Staunton in the Vale, Nottinghamshire

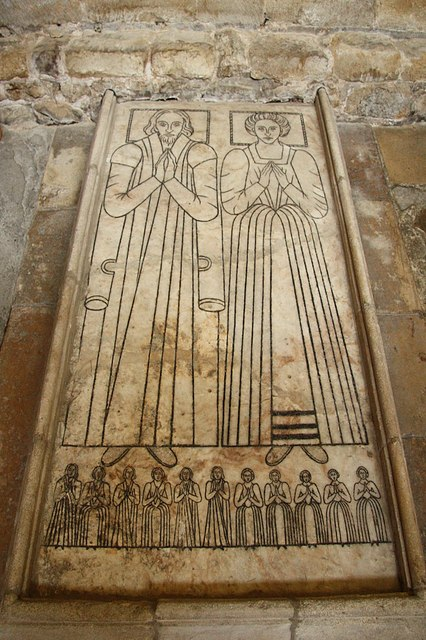
Sir John and Elizabeth Pate, St Mary's Church, Melton Mowbray, Leicestershire

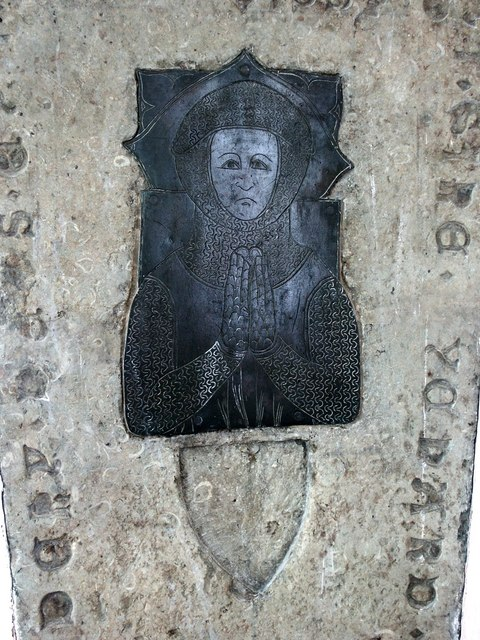
Interior of St Michael, Buslingthorpe, Lincolnshire.

== Literature ==
- Blair, J. (1991) Purbeck Marble in Blair, J. and Ramsey, N. English Medieval Industries: Craftsmen, techniques and Products Hambledon Press; pp. 41–56. ISBN 0907628877
- Boutell, C. (1854), Christian monuments in England and Wales: an historical and descriptive sketch of the various classes of sepulchral monuments which have been in use in this country from about the era of the Norman conquest to the time of Edward the Fourth. London 1854.
- Fawcett, Jane (2001) Historic Floors Their Care and Conservation. Butterworth Heinemann ISBN 978-0750654524
- Greenhill, F. A. (1986), Monumental Incised Slabs in the County of Lincoln, Coales Foundation, Newport Pagnell. ISBN 0951007602
- Greenhill, F. A. (1969), Incised Effigial Slabs: A Study of Engraved Stone Memorials in Latin Christendom, c. 1100 to c. 1700., Faber, London. 2 vols.
- McGrath, Annette (2006) The Rock Quarries of Charnwood Forest Vol. 16
- Ramsey, D. A., (2000). Newtown Linford Notes and the Leicestershire Slate Industry. (Bradgate and its Villages Series, 4.) Groby: Ramsey.
