= St Mary le Wigford =

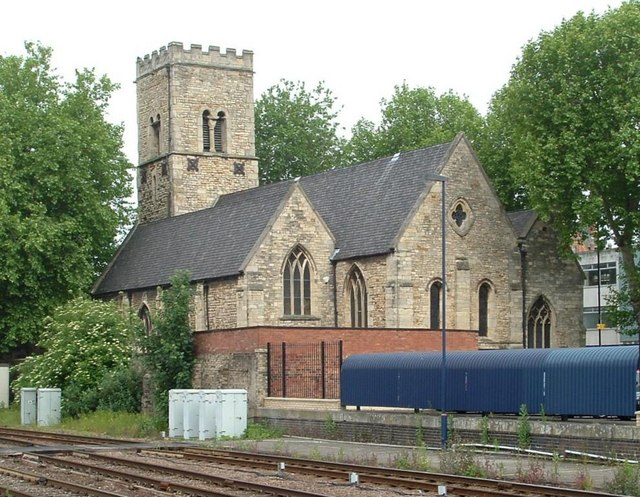
- St Mary le Wigford
- 53.226668°N 0.541008°W
- OS grid reference: SK 97572 71472
- Country: England
- Denomination: Church of England
- Churchmanship: Broad Church
- Website: www.stmarylewigford.co.uk

Architecture
- Heritage designation: Grade I listed

Administration
- Diocese: Diocese of Lincoln
- Parish: Lincoln

St Mary le Wigford is a Grade I listed parish church in Lincoln, in the county of Lincolnshire, England.

== History ==
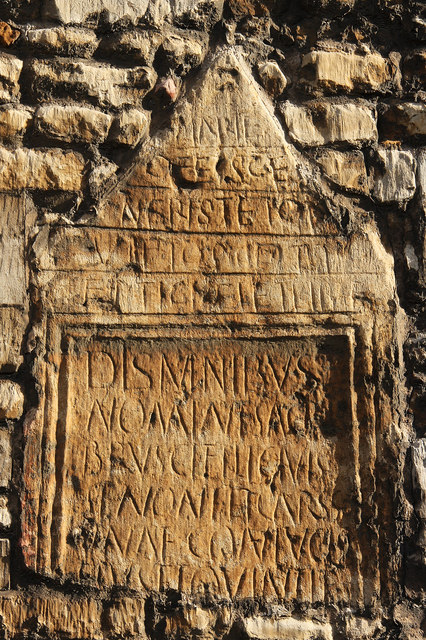
The dedication stone made from a re-used Roman tombstone

The church dates from the 11th century, with 12th and 13th century additions. The dedication stone in the west tower is a re-used Roman tombstone with a later Anglo-Saxon inscription which translates to "Eirtig had me built and endowed to the glory of Christ and Saint Mary, XP".

The church was restored in 1872 by R. C. Clarke of Nottingham. The south aisle was added in 1877 by Leach of Cambridge. The tower was restored by Watkins and Son in 1908. Later additions and alterations were done in 1975.

The tower contains 4 bells with a tenor of 6-hundredweight, all of which date from the 17th century. Two were cast in 1616, with two trebles added in 1636. The bells were rehung in 1932 by John Taylor & Co of Loughborough, when they were retuned as 1–4 of 6.

== Memorials ==
There is an alabaster chest tomb, 1618, possibly by Maximilian Colt to Sir Thomas Grantham which was originally in St Martin's Church, Lincoln, since demolished.

== Organ ==
Details of the organ can be found on the National Pipe Organ Register.

=== Organists ===
- Francis Marshall Ward 1857 – ???? (formerly organist of Priory Church of St Mary, Abergavenny)
- William Thomas Freemantle
- Dennis Townhill 1943–1947

== Gallery ==
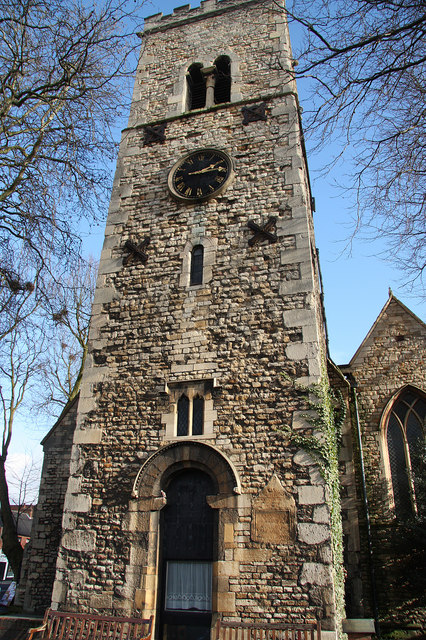
The west tower shows the dedication stone to the right of the doorway

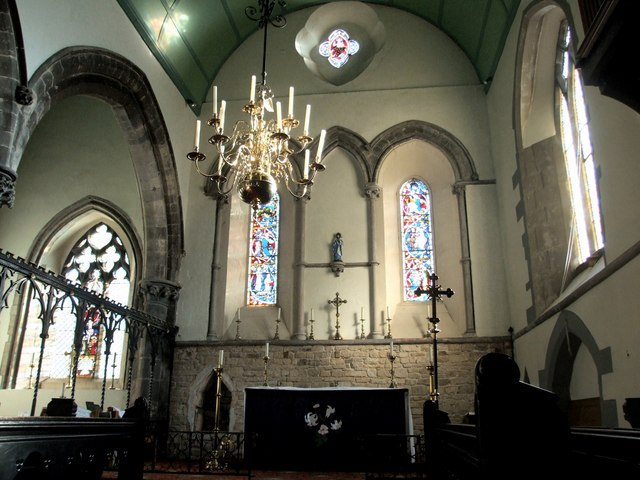
The choir and high altar

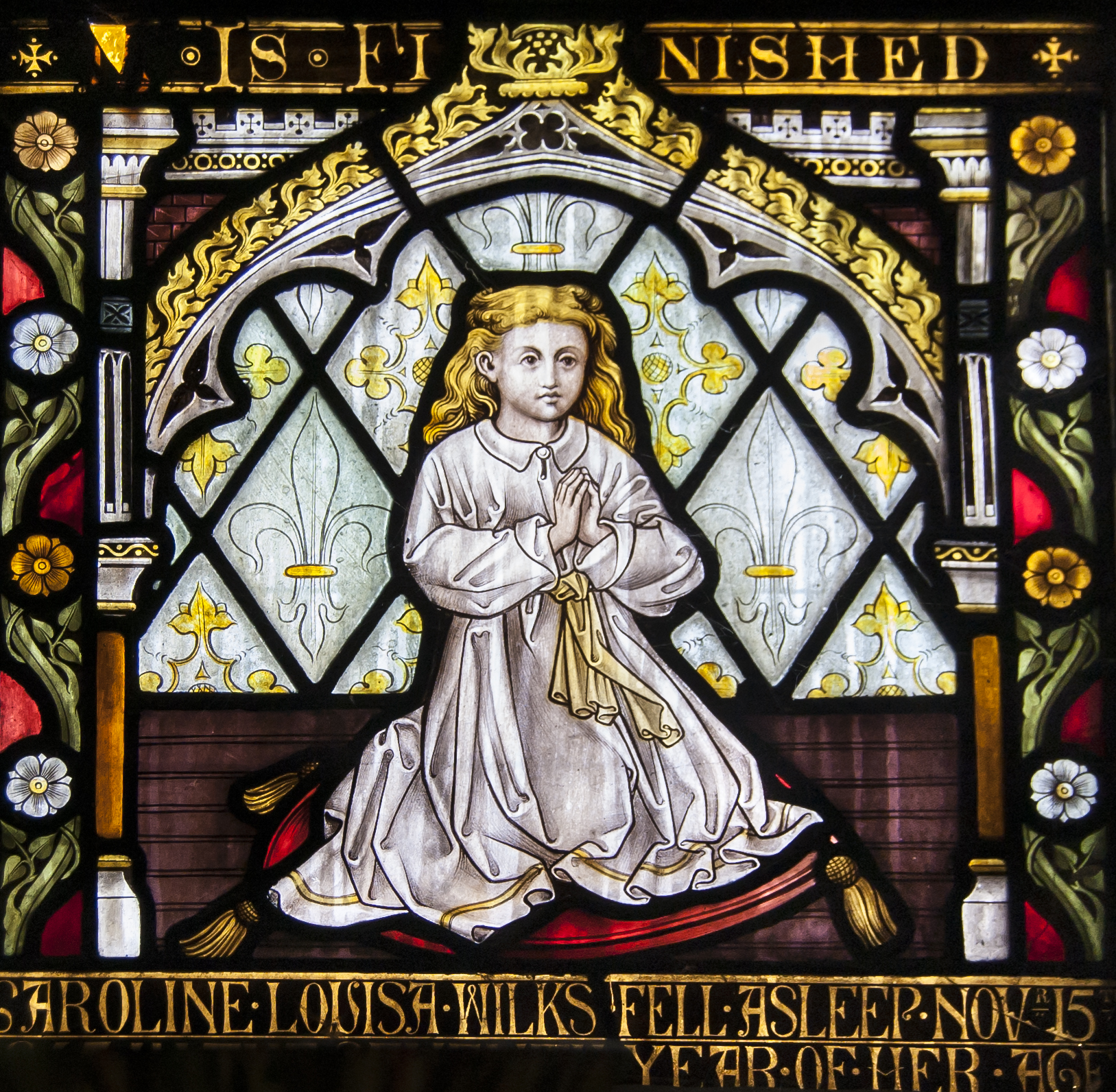
Stained glass window, St Mary le Wigford, Lincoln

== See also: Churches in Lincoln ==
- St Benedict's Church, Lincoln
- St Peter at Gowts
- St Martin's Church, Lincoln
- St Peter at Arches Church, Lincoln
