= St Martin's Church, Lincoln =

Former church in Lincolnshire, England

Coordinates: 53°13′58.33″N 0°32′24.95″W

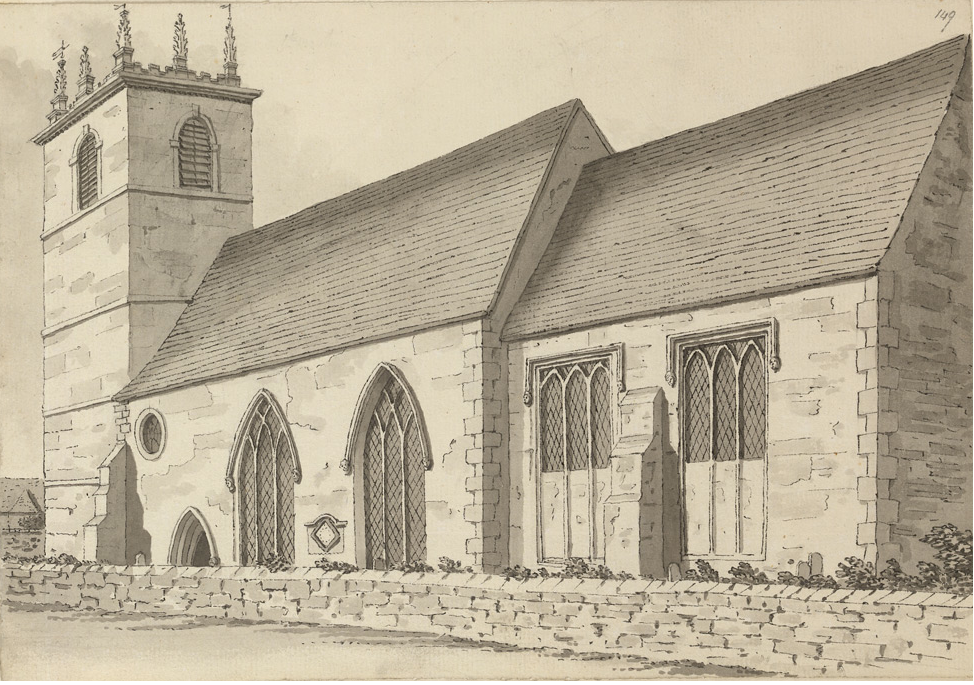

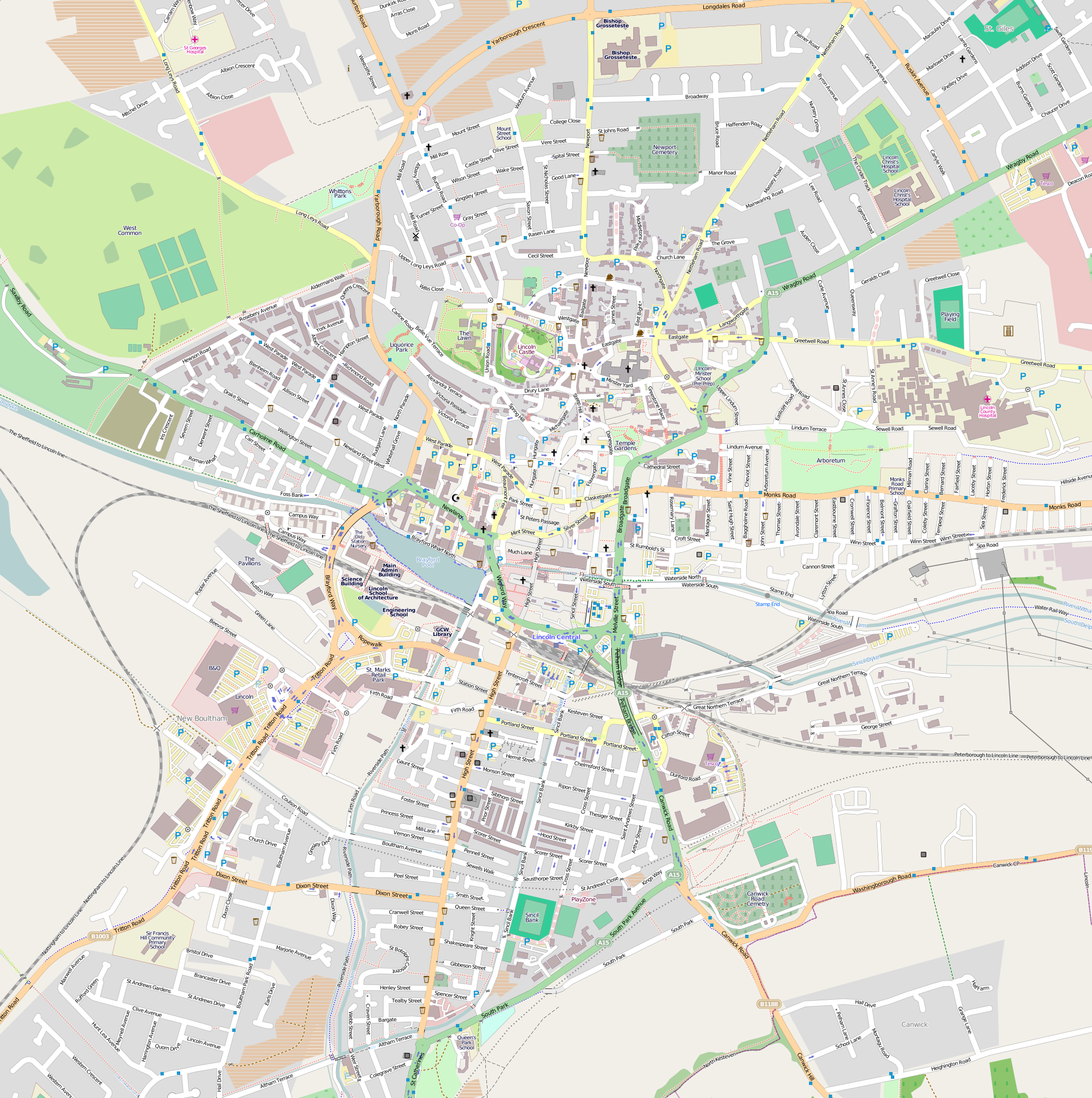
- Shown within Lincoln
- OS grid reference: SK 97532 71639
- Location: Lincoln, Lincolnshire
- Country: England
- Denomination: Church of England

History
- Consecrated: 9th–10th Century

Architecture
- Style: Georgian
- Years built: 1740

Administration
- Diocese: Lincoln

St Martin's Church, now demolished, was among the oldest churches in the city of Lincoln, England. It was rebuilt in 1873 but then demolished six years later in 1879.

It is possible that during the Anglo-Saxon period and during the Danelaw, St Martin was considered to be the patron saint of Lincoln. The church is likely to have been associated with the rare St Martin silver pennies minted in Lincoln, probably before 918 AD, when Lincoln was taken back from the Danes by the Anglo-Saxons.

== History ==
The church stood at the top of Lincoln High Street in the downhill area of Lincoln, before the land rises steeply to 'uphill' Lincoln, which is dominated by Lincoln Cathedral. In the Medieval period the area around St Martin's church was the commercial centre of Lincoln and it stood very close to the Norman Jew's House and Jews Court. The church was largely destroyed in the English Civil War in 1643 and left as a ruin until 1739–40 when it was rebuilt in a Georgian style. This is the church that was recorded by the artist Samuel Hieronymus Grimm around 1784. About 1812 a new aisle was added to the church by the Lincoln architect William Hayward. Then in 1873, it was suggested that the whole of the church should be demolished to make way for a larger church. Due to the intervention of the Mayor of Lincoln, the tower, which was a prominent landmark on the Lincoln skyline, was saved until it was demolished in about 1930. Much of the decorative stonework from the demolished church was used in the new church of St Andrew in Canwick Road which was built in 1876–7, but this church was itself demolished in 1970.

St Martin's Church was rebuilt in 1873 in West Parade at the corner with Orchard Street by the architect A S Beckett. An application was made to demolish the replacement church in 1966, and after a legal hearing the building was demolished in 1970.

Today, only the graveyard, which lies between St Martin's Lane and Garmston Street remains. The graveyard has been paved with some of the grave-slabs from the old church.

== Surviving objects from the church ==
=== Church silver ===
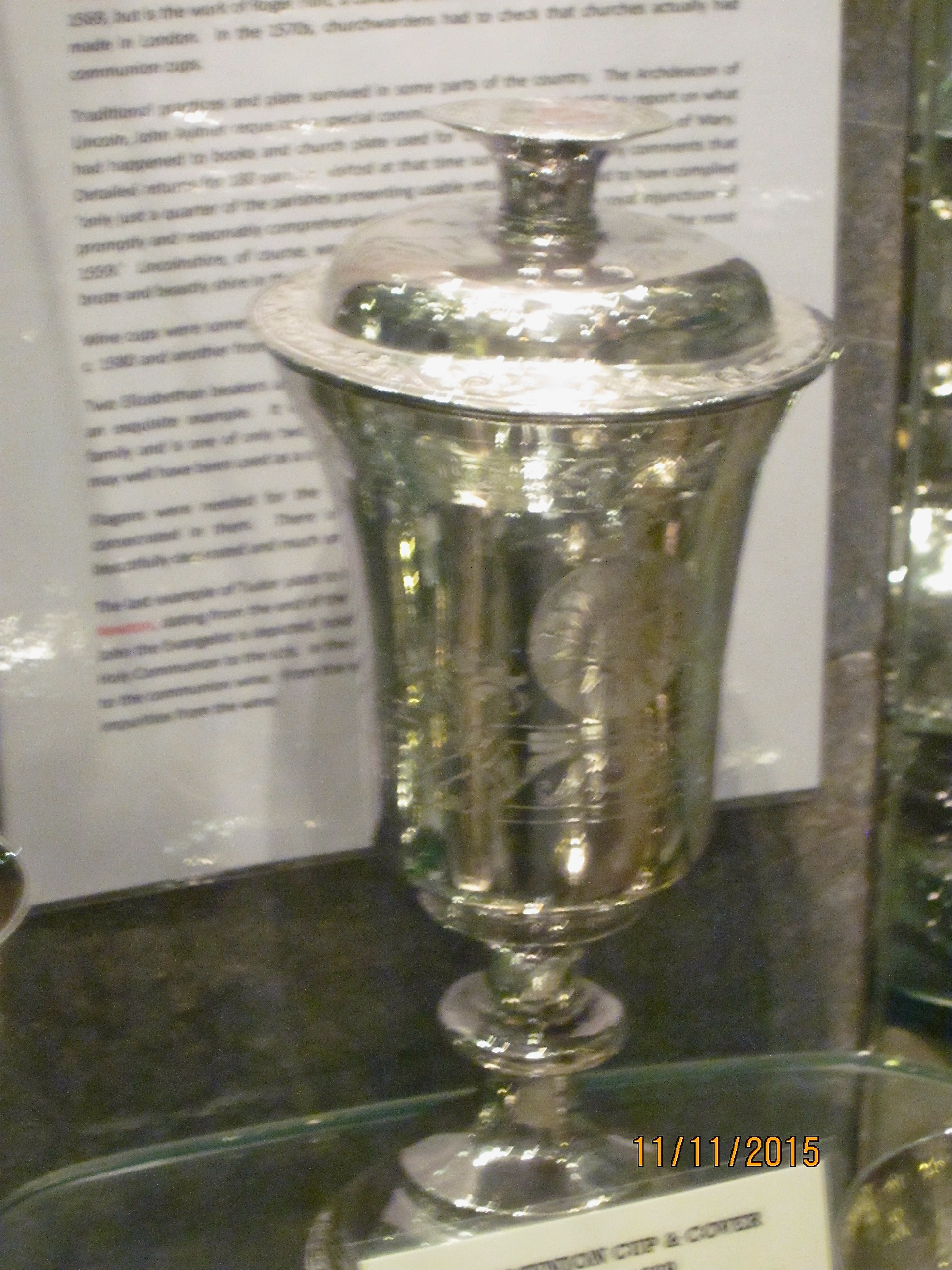
Communion Cup of St Martin's, Lincoln, 1569, in Lincoln Cathedral Treasury

Surviving objects from the church included the communion plate which consisted of three communion cups silver with paten covers and two silver flagons. One of these cups, with a paten cover made by an unknown maker with initial 'A' and hallmarked in London in 1569, is now on display in the Lincoln Cathedral Treasury.

=== Monument to Sir Thomas Grantham ===
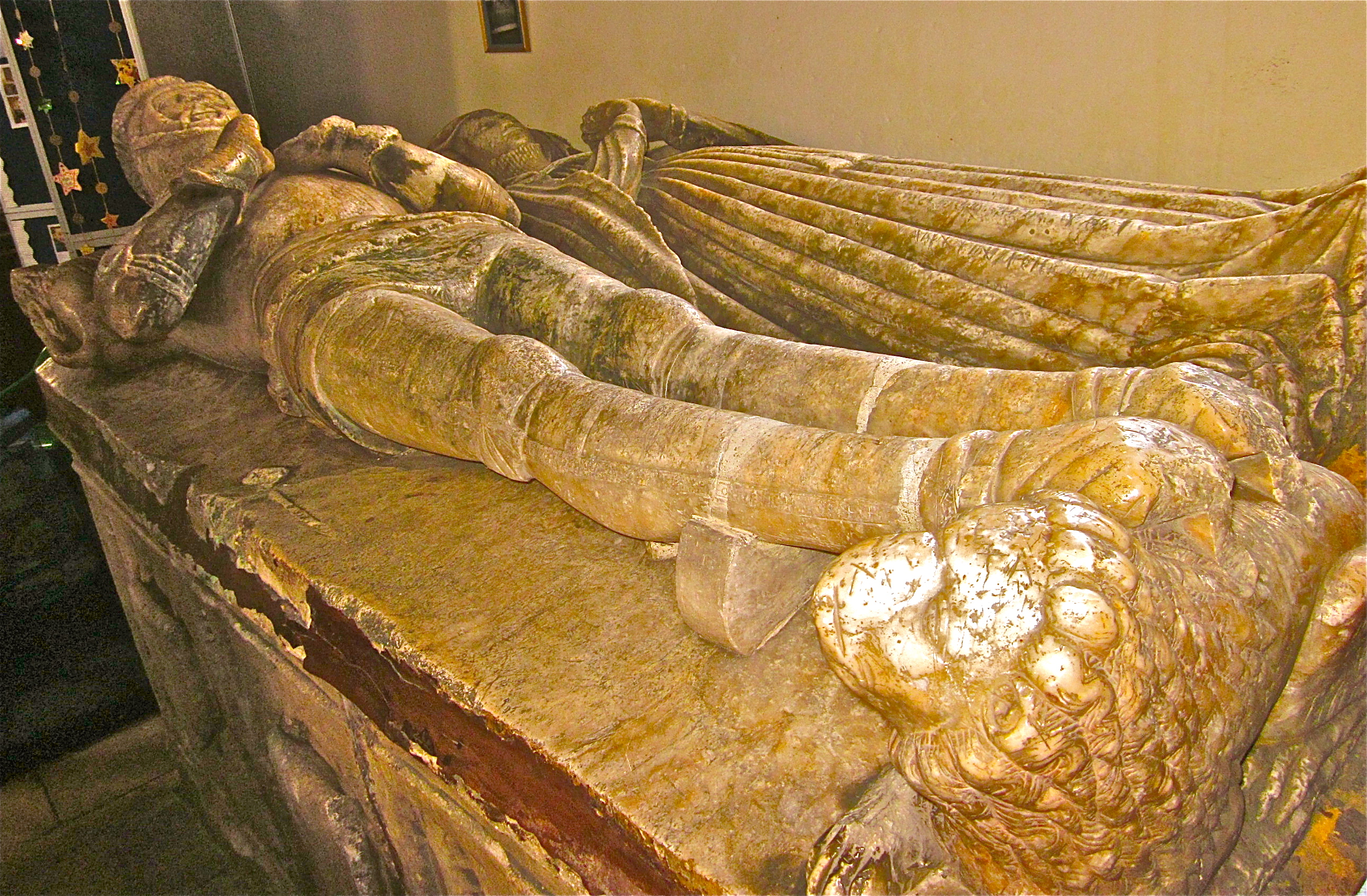
Tomb of Sir Thomas Grantham 1630

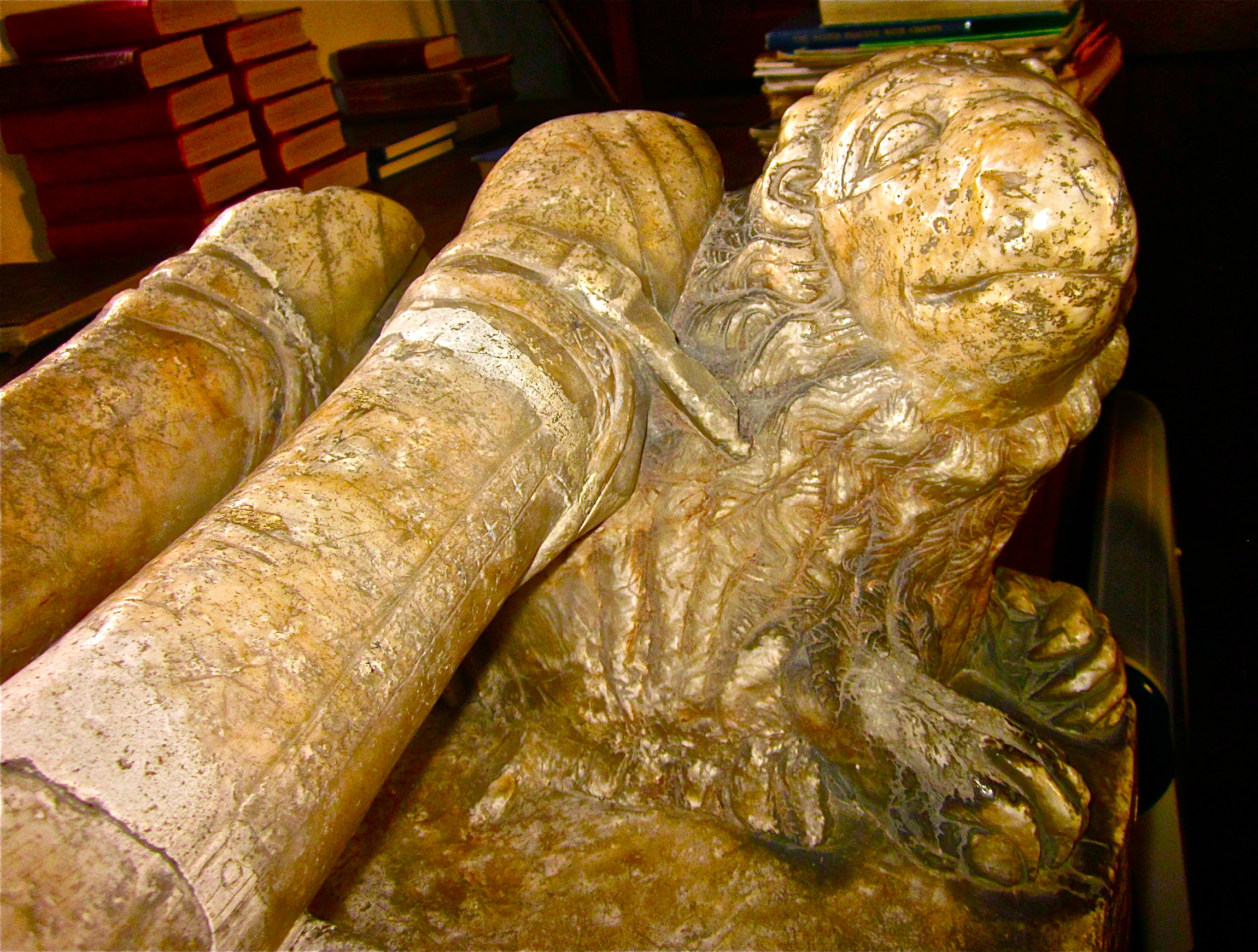
The lion on which Sir Thomas's feet rest

The Grantham family was an important and long-established family in the parish, who occupied the prebendal house of St Martin's on the High Street. The family monuments were in the north aisle of the chancel of the church. Of these monuments, one was a particularly fine Renaissance monument to Sir Thomas Grantham (died 1630) and his first wife Frances (Puckering) (died 1610). Sir Thomas was an MP for Lincoln and Lincolnshire. This monument is now in the church of St Mary le Wigford, Lincoln. The tomb, which now lacks its canopy, is made from alabaster sourced from Nottingham, and is likely to be the work of the noted sculptor Maximilian Colt. The tomb has had a very chequered history. When Edward James Willson visited the church in 1807 he found the canopy had fallen and broken the faces of the recumbent figures. It was later moved into the church tower. In 1889 a Mr Justice Grantham, who claimed to be a descendant, removed the tomb without permission to Barcombe in East Sussex. The remaining fragments of the effigies were reclaimed and placed in St Benedict's Church Lincoln, where in 1956 Sir Francis Hill says that the mutilated fragments lay '"after unseemly neglect and ill-usage"'.

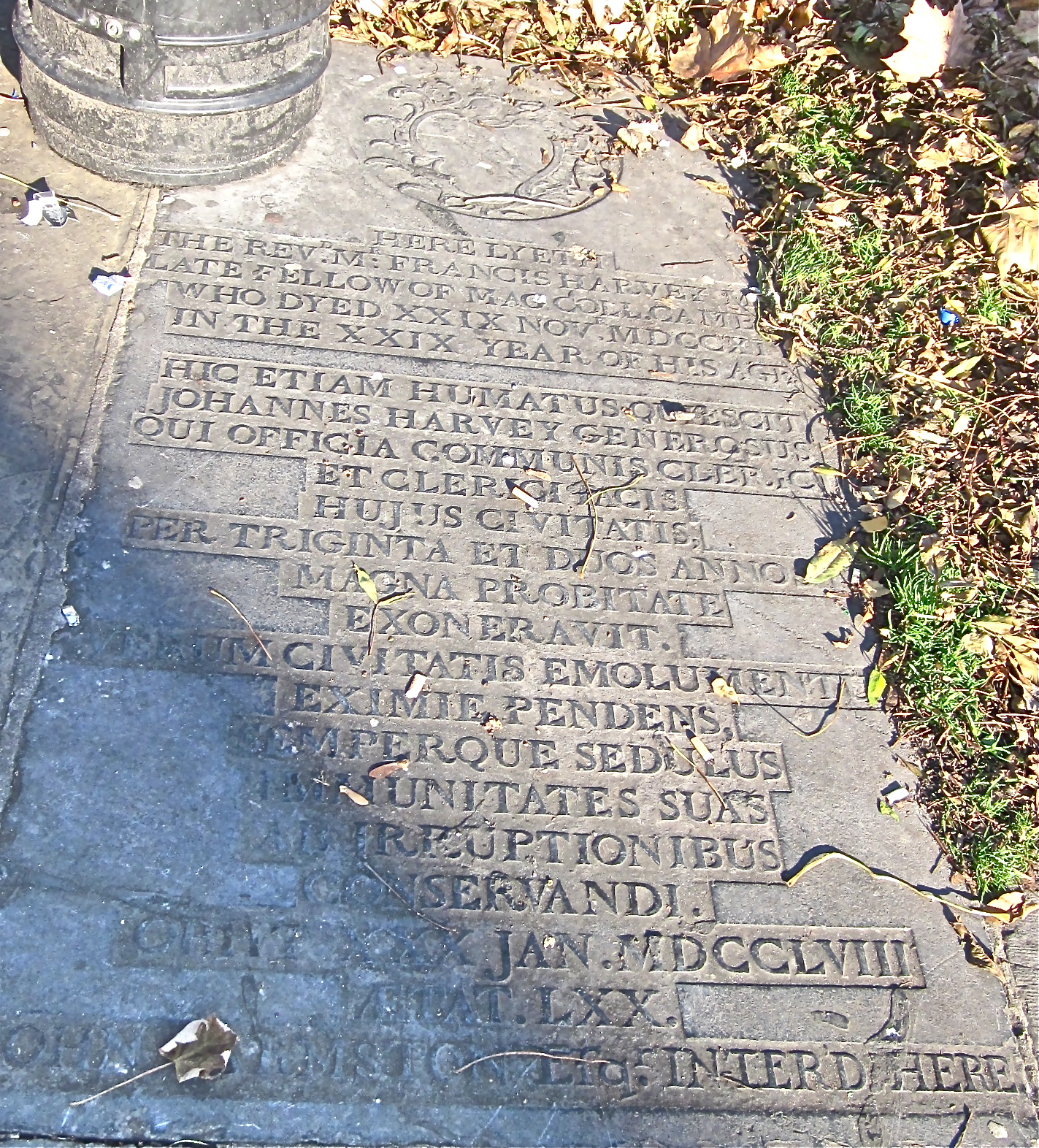
Grave slab of the Rev Francis Harvey and John Harvey in St Martin's churchyard in Lincoln

Sometime before 1985 the tomb chest and fragments were reassembled in St Mary le Wigford and this was recorded by the Church Monuments Society. However, subsequently more of the figures have re-appeared including the lion on which Sir Thomas rests his feet, and the figures have been re-arranged.

=== Grave slab in St Martin’s Churchyard to the Rev. Francis Harvey and John Harvey ===
Among the grave slabs now used as paving in St Martin's Churchyard is a fine memorial slab to the Rev. Francis Harvey who died aged 29 years in 1711, and John Harvey who died in 1758. The grave slab is carved in cameo lettering on a black marble slab with the family coat of arms above. There are two very similarly carved black marble slabs, the source of which is yet to be identified, in the east end of the chancel of Lincoln Cathedral. These distinctive grave slabs were presumably produced in a local workshop.

Details of Francis Harvey are given in Alumni Cantabrigienses. He was the son of Francis Harvey of Lincoln and went to school at Newark. He became a fellow of Magdalene College, Cambridge in 1708.

== The St Martin of Lincoln silver penny ==
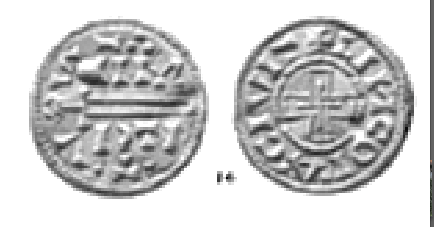
St Martin of Lincoln silver penny c.918 A.D

These very rare silver coins were minted in Lincoln shortly before the end of Danish rule. The obverse of the coin has a sword and is crudely lettered "Sancti Marti", and on the reverse is a cross and is lettered "Civit Lincolia", for Lincoln. It is possible that at that time St Martin was the patron saint of Lincoln and that these coins were minted in the vicinity of St Martin's church, the main commercial centre of Lincoln then. Currently about 14 examples of these coins are known, and one from the Sir Francis Hill collection is in the Usher Gallery in Lincoln. A particularly fine specimen of a St Martin penny was found in the Vale of York Hoard in 2006.

== See also ==
- Churches in Lincoln

== Literature ==
- Antram N (revised), Pevsner N & Harris J, (1989), The Buildings of England: Lincolnshire, Yale University Press.
- Pevsner N & Harris J, (1964), The Buildings of England: Lincolnshire, Penguin. p. 144.
- Stewart I. (1967) The St Martin Coins of Lincoln British Numismatic Journal, Vol.36, pp. 46–54.
- Venables E. (1875-6) The Destroyed churches of St Paul and St Martin in the City of Lincoln. Associated Architectural Society Reports and Papers, Vol.13, pp. 208–216.
