= City of Lincoln Council elections =

Local government elections in Lincolnshire, England

One third of the City of Lincoln Council in Lincolnshire, England is elected each year, followed by one year when there is an election to Lincolnshire County Council instead. Since the last boundary changes in 2016 the council has comprised 33 councillors representing 11 wards, with each ward electing three councillors.

== Council elections ==
- 1973 City of Lincoln Council election
- 1976 City of Lincoln Council election
- 1979 City of Lincoln Council election (New ward boundaries)
- 1980 City of Lincoln Council election
- 1982 City of Lincoln Council election (City boundary changes took place but the number of seats remained the same)
- 1983 City of Lincoln Council election
- 1984 City of Lincoln Council election
- 1986 City of Lincoln Council election
- 1987 City of Lincoln Council election
- 1988 City of Lincoln Council election
- 1990 City of Lincoln Council election
- 1991 City of Lincoln Council election
- 1992 City of Lincoln Council election
- 1994 City of Lincoln Council election
- 1995 City of Lincoln Council election
- 1996 City of Lincoln Council election
- 1998 City of Lincoln Council election
- 1999 City of Lincoln Council election (New ward boundaries)
- 2000 City of Lincoln Council election
- 2002 City of Lincoln Council election
- 2003 City of Lincoln Council election
- 2004 City of Lincoln Council election
- 2006 City of Lincoln Council election
- 2007 City of Lincoln Council election (New ward boundaries)
- 2008 City of Lincoln Council election
- 2010 City of Lincoln Council election
- 2011 City of Lincoln Council election
- 2012 City of Lincoln Council election
- 2014 City of Lincoln Council election
- 2015 City of Lincoln Council election
- 2016 City of Lincoln Council election (New ward boundaries)
- 2018 City of Lincoln Council election
- 2019 City of Lincoln Council election
- 2021 City of Lincoln Council election
- 2022 City of Lincoln Council election
- 2023 City of Lincoln Council election
- 2024 City of Lincoln Council election
- 2026 City of Lincoln Council election

== Result maps ==
1979 results map

1980 results map

1982 results map

1983 results map

1984 results map

1986 results map

1987 results map

1988 results map

1990 results map

1991 results map

1992 results map

1994 results map

1995 results map

1996 results map

1998 results map

1999 results map

2000 results map

2002 results map

2003 results map

2004 results map

2006 results map

2007 results map

2008 results map

2010 results map

2011 results map

2012 results map

2014 results map

2015 results map

2016 results map

2018 results map

2019 results map

2021 results map

2022 results map

2023 results map

2024 results map

2026 results map

== By-election results ==
=== 1994-1998 ===
Carholme By-Election 22 May 1997
Party	Candidate	Votes	%	±%
Labour		841	54.6	
Conservative		380	24.7	
Independent		223	14.5	
Green		95	6.2	
Majority		461	29.9	
Turnout		1,539	28.3	
Labour hold		Swing		

=== 1998-2002 ===
Park By-Election 2 July 1998
Party	Candidate	Votes	%	±%
Labour		416	52.1	▼28.5
Conservative		156	19.5	▲5.8
Liberal Democrats		112	14.0	▲14.0
Independent		93	11.7	▲11.7
Green		21	2.6	▼3.1
Majority		260	32.6	
Turnout		798		
Labour hold		Swing		

=== 2002-2006 ===
Boultham By-Election 11 July 2002
Party	Candidate	Votes	%	±%
Labour		605	52.9	▼3.3
Independent		273	23.9	▲5.0
Conservative		265	23.2	▲0.0
Majority		332	29.0	
Turnout		1,143	20.5	
Labour hold		Swing		

=== 2006-2010 ===
Moorland By-Election 29 June 2006
Party	Candidate	Votes	%	±%
Conservative	Oliver Peeke	640	39.9	▼15.9
Labour	Martin Bushell	569	35.5	▼8.7
BNP	Philip Marshall	254	15.8	▲15.8
Liberal Democrats	John Price	96	6.0	▲6.0
UKIP	Nicholas Smith	46	2.9	▲2.9
Majority		71	4.4	
Turnout		1,605	28.1	
Conservative hold		Swing	-3.6	

=== 2010-2014 ===
Bracebridge By-Election 22 August 2013
Party	Candidate	Votes	%	±%
Labour	Katie Vause	577	38.7%	▼2.5
Conservative	David Denman	480	32.2%	▼8.6
UKIP	Elaine Elizabeth Warde	345	32.1%	▲12.7
Liberal Democrats	Ross David Pepper	75	5.0%	▲0.3
TUSC	Karen Elizabeth Williams	14	0.9%	▲0.9
Majority		97		
Turnout		1,491	26%	
Labour gain from Conservative		Swing		

Carholme By-Election 19 October 2017
Party	Candidate	Votes	%	±%
Labour	Lucinda Preston	922	63.4%	▲6.3%
Conservative	Kateryna R Salvador	368	25.3%	▲5.2%
Green	Benjamin Loryman	83	5.7%	▼8.5%
Liberal Democrats	James R. Brown	82	5.6	▼2.9%
Majority				
Turnout		1,455		
Labour hold		Swing		

=== 2018-2022 ===
Witham By-Election 12 December 2019
Party	Candidate	Votes	%	±%
Conservative	Bill Mara	2,403	59.0%	▲3.7
Labour	Calum Watt	1,190	29.2%	▲1.2
Liberal Democrats	Charles Parker	267	6.6%	▲0.8
Green	Michele Servaud	214	5.3%	▼5.5
Majority		1,213	29.8	
Turnout		4,074		
Conservative hold		Swing		

=== 2022-2026 ===
Park By-Election 3 April 2025
Party	Candidate	Votes	%	±%
Liberal Democrats	Sarah Uldall	366	35.7	+12.3
Labour	Sean Burke-Ulyat	280	27.3	–19.9
Reform	Tony Todd	180	17.6	+11.4
Conservative	Joey Gwinn	87	8.5	+1.3
Green	Sally Horscroft	87	8.5	–1.8
TUSC	Nick Parker	25	2.4	N/A
Majority		86	8.4	
Turnout		1,025		
Liberal Democrats gain from Labour		Swing		
