= 2024 City of Lincoln Council election =

2024 election in Lincolnshire, England

← 2023	2 May 2024	2026 →

11 of the 33 seats to City of Lincoln Council 17 seats needed for a majority

	First party	Second party	Third party
Leader	Ric Metcalfe	Thomas Dyer	Clare Smalley
Party	Labour	Conservative	Liberal Democrats
Last election	20	9	4
Seats won	8	1	2
Seats after	23	5	5
Seat change	▲3	▼4	▲1
Popular vote	8,196	3,853	3,314
Percentage	45.0%	21.1%	18.2%
Swing	▼4.2%	▼4.7%	▲1.5%
- Map showing the results of the 2024 Lincoln City Council elections by ward. Red shows Labour, blue shows the Conservatives and orange shows the Liberal Democrats.
Leader before election
Ric Metcalfe
Labour
Leader after election
Naomi Tweddle
Labour

The 2024 City of Lincoln Council election was held on Thursday 2 May 2024 to elect 11 of the 33 members of City of Lincoln Council, being the usual third of the council. It took place on the same day as other local elections in the United Kingdom.

== Summary ==
The council remained under Labour majority control at this election, with the party increasing their majority. The leader of the council prior to the election, Ric Metcalfe, did not stand for re-election. After the election Labour chose Naomi Tweddle to be their new group leader. She was formally appointed as leader of the council at the subsequent annual council meeting on 14 May 2024.

== Pre-election composition ==
Pre-Election Composition
Party	Seats
Labour	20
Conservative	9
Liberal Democrat	4

== Councillors standing down ==
Councillor	Ward	First elected	Party	Date announced
Ric Metcalfe	Glebe	1982	Labour	16 January 2024

== Results summary ==
2024 Lincoln City Council election
Party	This election			Full council			This election		
Party	Seats	Net	Seats %	Other	Total	Total %	Votes	Votes %	+/−
Labour	8	▲3	72.7	15	23	69.7	8,196	45.0	-4.2
Conservative	1	▼4	9.1	4	5	15.2	3,853	21.1	-4.7
Liberal Democrats	2	▲1	18.2	3	5	15.2	3,314	18.2	+1.5
Reform UK	0	Steady	0.0	0	0	0.0	1470	8.1	+5.8
Green	0	Steady	0.0	0	0	0.0	985	5.4	+1.0
Party of Women	0	Steady	0.0	0	0	0.0	167	0.9	New
Lincolnshire Independent	0	Steady	0.0	0	0	0.0	140	0.8	New
TUSC	0	Steady	0.0	0	0	0.0	73	0.4	0.0
Liberal	0	Steady	0.0	0	0	0.0	26	0.1	0.0

== Ward results ==
=== Abbey ===
Abbey
Party	Candidate	Votes	%	±%
Liberal Democrats	Clare Smalley	1,050	52.5	−3.9
Labour Co-op	Calvin Bissitt	630	31.5	+4.5
Conservative	Roger Hansard	109	5.5	−2.9
Reform UK	Donald Penman	109	5.5	+2.4
Green	Betty Whitwell	101	5.1	+0.1
Majority		420	21.0	−8.4
Turnout		1,999	32.2	+2.4
Liberal Democrats hold		Swing	▼4.2	

=== Birchwood ===
Birchwood
Party	Candidate	Votes	%	±%
Labour	Laura Danese	663	43.8	−1.3
Conservative	Eddie Strengeil	573	37.8	−2.0
Reform UK	Tony Todd	175	11.6	+4.3
Liberal Democrats	Felicity Christopher	104	6.9	−0.9
Majority		90	6.0	+0.7
Turnout		1,515	25.8	+0.1
Labour gain from Conservative		Swing	▲0.4	

=== Boultham ===
Boultham
Party	Candidate	Votes	%	±%
Labour Co-op	Calum Watt	801	55.4	−3.6
Conservative	George Clark	250	17.3	−8.2
Reform UK	Mike Bailey	155	10.7	+10.7
Liberal Democrats	Debbie Grant	123	8.5	+1.2
Green	David Kenyon	116	8.0	−1.0
Majority		551	38.1	+4.6
Turnout		1,445	28.3	+1.3
Labour Co-op hold		Swing	▲2.3	

=== Carholme ===
Carholme
Party	Candidate	Votes	%	±%
Labour Co-op	Lucinda Preston	1,062	56.3	−2.6
Liberal Democrats	Freddie Easters	366	19.4	+14.7
Conservative	Thomas Hulme	141	7.5	−4.5
Lincolnshire Independent	Ashley Delaney	140	7.4	+7.4
Green	Séamus Murray	103	5.5	−3.0
TUSC	Nick Parker	73	3.9	+0.3
Majority		636	36.9	−10.0
Turnout		1,885	34.3	+0.1
Labour Co-op hold		Swing	▼5.0	

=== Castle ===
Castle
Party	Candidate	Votes	%	±%
Labour	Donald Nannestad	894	59.9	−2.5
Conservative	Joseph Gwinn	212	14.2	−5.3
Green	Lauren Ross	141	9.4	−0.7
Reform UK	Corina Ochoa Avalos	130	8.7	+8.7
Liberal Democrats	Keith Ballinger	90	6.0	−2.1
Liberal	Charles Shaw	26	1.7	+1.7
Majority		682	45.7	+2.8
Turnout		1,493	28.0	−1.5
Labour hold		Swing	▲1.4	

=== Glebe ===
Glebe
Party	Candidate	Votes	%	±%
Liberal Democrats	James Brown	857	51.7	−5.9
Labour	Duncan Spencer	473	28.5	+2.3
Conservative	Victoria Brooks	173	10.4	−2.2
Reform UK	Allan McCauley	156	9.4	+9.4
Majority		384	23.2	−8.2
Turnout		1,659	29.1	−1.9
Liberal Democrats gain from Labour		Swing	▼4.1	

=== Hartsholme ===
Hartsholme
Party	Candidate	Votes	%	±%
Labour	Annie Currier	849	43.3	−18.5
Conservative	David Clarkson	692	35.3	+7.8
Reform UK	Jane Smith	190	9.7	+5.1
Liberal Democrats	Jim Charters	129	6.6	+0.6
Green	Charles Rodgers	99	5.1	+5.1
Majority		157	8.0	−26.3
Turnout		1,959	31.5	−4.9
Labour gain from Conservative		Swing	▼13.2	

=== Minster ===
Minster
Party	Candidate	Votes	%	±%
Labour	Anita Pritchard	816	49.2	−1.8
Conservative	Mark Storer	457	27.5	−8.1
Reform UK	Alex Cambo	129	7.8	+4.3
Green	Valeria Wilkinson	89	5.4	−0.1
Liberal Democrats	Aidan Turner	85	5.1	+0.6
Party of Women	Esther Knight	84	5.1	+5.1
Majority		359	21.7	+6.3
Turnout		1,660	31.5	−2.0
Labour gain from Conservative		Swing	▲3.2	

=== Moorland ===
Moorland
Party	Candidate	Votes	%	±%
Labour	Callum Roper	667	45.5	−7.8
Conservative	Matthew Fido	479	32.7	−4.4
Reform UK	Darren Benson	155	10.6	+10.6
Green	Paddy Driscoll	100	6.8	+6.8
Liberal Democrats	Olly Craven	64	4.4	−5.2
Majority		188	12.8	−3.4
Turnout		1,465	26.5	+0.8
Labour hold		Swing	▼1.7	

=== Park ===
Park
Party	Candidate	Votes	%	±%
Labour Co-op	Chris Burke	696	47.2	−16.2
Liberal Democrats	Sarah Uldall	346	23.4	+16.2
Green	Sally Horscroft	152	10.3	−1.6
Conservative	Charlie Rogers	107	7.2	−10.2
Reform UK	Ben Jackson	92	6.2	+6.2
Party of Women	Sarah Freeman	83	5.6	+5.6
Majority		350	23.8	−22.1
Turnout		1,476	23.4	+3.5
Labour Co-op hold		Swing	▼16.2	

=== Witham ===
Witham
Party	Candidate	Votes	%	±%
Conservative	Bill Mara	660	39.6	−8.9
Labour	Jane Loffhagen	645	38.7	−0.6
Reform UK	Nick Smith	179	10.7	+6.0
Liberal Democrats	Sharon Osborne	100	6.0	−1.5
Green	Lynda Skipper	84	5.0	+5.0
Majority		15	0.9	−8.3
Turnout		1,668	28.3	−2.6
Conservative hold		Swing	▼4.7	

=== By-elections ===
==== Park ====
Park by-election: 3 April 2025
Party	Candidate	Votes	%	±%
Liberal Democrats	Sarah Uldall	366	35.7	+12.3
Labour	Sean Burke-Ulyat	280	27.3	–19.9
Reform UK	Tony Todd	180	17.6	+11.4
Conservative	Joey Gwinn	87	8.5	+1.3
Green	Sally Horscroft	87	8.5	–1.8
TUSC	Nick Parker	25	2.4	N/A
Majority		86	8.4	N/A
Turnout		1,025	15.7	–7.7
Liberal Democrats gain from Labour		Swing	▲16.1	

== See also ==
- City of Lincoln Council elections
