= 1996 City of Lincoln Council election =

Election held in City of Lincoln Council in 1996

← 1995	2 May 1996	1998 →

11 of the 33 seats to City of Lincoln Council 17 seats needed for a majority
	First party	Second party
Party	Labour	Conservative
Last election	31	2
Seats won	11	0
Seats after	33	0
Seat change	▲2	▼2
Popular vote	14,161	4,883
Percentage	69.4%	23.9%
- Map showing the results of the 1996 Lincoln City Council elections by ward. Red shows Labour seats and blue shows Conservative seats.
Council control before election
Labour
Council control after election
Labour

The 1996 City of Lincoln Council election took place on 2 May 1996. This was on the same day as other local elections. One third of the council was up for election: the seats of which were last contested in 1992. The Labour Party retained control of the council.

== Overall results ==
1996 City of Lincoln Council Election
Party	Seats	Gains	Losses	Net gain/loss	Seats %	Votes %	Votes	+/−
Labour	11	2	0	▲2	100.0	69.4	14,161	▲17.8
Conservative	0	0	2	▼2	0.0	23.9	4,883	▼18.5
Liberal Democrats	0	0	0	Steady	0.0	1.2	243	▼2.6
Green	0	0	0	Steady	0.0	5.5	1,130	▲3.0
Total	11						20,417	

All comparisons in vote share are to the corresponding 1992 election.

== Ward results ==
=== Abbey ===
Location of Abbey ward

Abbey
Party	Candidate	Votes	%
Labour	J. Robertson	1,190	79.2%
Conservative	P. Forbes-Ritte	208	13.8%
Green	P. North	104	6.9%
Turnout			30.2%
Labour hold			

=== Birchwood ===
Location of Birchwood ward

Birchwood
Party	Candidate	Votes	%
Labour	Stephen Allnutt	1,820	58.9%
Conservative	Edmund Strengiel	1,147	37.1%
Green	T. Ligema	121	3.9%
Turnout			32.4%
Labour gain from Conservative			

=== Boultham ===
Location of Boultham ward

Boultham
Party	Candidate	Votes	%
Labour	Ralph Toofany	1,221	76.5%
Conservative	M. Franks	268	16.8%
Green	G. Phillips	108	6.8%
Turnout			30.9%
Labour hold			

=== Bracebridge ===
Location of Bracebridge ward

Bracebridge
Party	Candidate	Votes	%
Labour	A. Bradley	1,273	69.0%
Conservative	R. Meads	491	26.6%
Green	R. Leedham-Green	80	4.3%
Turnout			30.7%
Labour hold			

=== Carholme ===
Location of Carholme ward

Carholme
Party	Candidate	Votes	%
Labour	S. Paterson	1,264	60.8%
Conservative	M. Mellows	402	19.3%
Liberal Democrats	L. Gabriel	243	11.7%
Green	D. Kane	171	8.2%
Turnout			38.3%
Labour hold			

=== Castle ===
Location of Castle ward

Castle
Party	Candidate	Votes	%
Labour	Loraine Woolley	1,324	75.1%
Conservative	B. Tibble	334	19.0%
Green	E. Gurney	104	5.9%
Turnout			33.4%
Labour hold			

=== Longdales ===
Location of Longdales ward

Longdales
Party	Candidate	Votes	%
Labour	P. McGinlay	1,216	69.5%
Conservative	David Gratrick	476	27.2%
Green	A. Hansell	57	3.3%
Turnout			36.6%
Labour hold			

=== Minster ===
Location of Minster ward

Minster
Party	Candidate	Votes	%
Labour	Lawrence Wells	1,648	65.3%
Conservative	C. Talbor	719	28.5%
Green	A. Smith	156	6.2%
Turnout			34.4%
Labour hold			

=== Moorland ===
Location of Moorland ward

Moorland
Party	Candidate	Votes	%
Labour	N. Baldock	1,192	70.7%
Conservative	D. Fraser	410	24.3%
Green	L. Durrant	84	5.0%
Turnout			34.5%
Labour gain from Conservative			

=== Park ===
Location of Park ward

Park
Party	Candidate	Votes	%
Labour	Y. Jackson	868	73.6%
Conservative	B. Briggs	223	18.9%
Green	K. Yates	88	7.5%
Turnout			23.9%
Labour hold			

=== Tritton ===
Location of Tritton ward

Tritton
Party	Candidate	Votes	%
Labour	Richard Coupland	1,145	81.4%
Conservative	M. Clark	205	14.6%
Green	R. Weavers	57	4.1%
Turnout			33.9%
Labour hold			

== By-elections between 1996 and 1998 ==
Carholme By-Election 22 May 1997
Party	Candidate	Votes	%
Labour		841	54.6
Conservative		380	24.7
Independent		223	14.5
Green		95	6.2
Majority		461	29.9
Turnout		1,539	28.3
Labour hold			
