= 1999 City of Lincoln Council election =

1999 UK local government election

← 1998	6 May 1999	2000 →

All 33 seats to City of Lincoln Council 17 seats needed for a majority
	First party	Second party
Party	Labour	Conservative
Last election	29	1
Seats after	31	2
Seat change	▲2	▲1
Popular vote	10,255	5,625
Percentage	47.5%	26.1%
- Map showing the results of the 1999 Lincoln City Council elections by ward. Red shows Labour seats and blue shows Conservative seats.
Council control before election
Labour
Council control after election
Labour

Elections to City of Lincoln Council in Lincolnshire, England, were held on 6 May 1999. The whole council was up for election with boundary changes since the last election in 1998. The Labour Party stayed in overall control of the Council.

== Election results ==
Lincoln local election result 1999
Party	Seats	Gains	Losses	Net gain/loss	Seats %	Votes %	Votes	+/−
Labour	31	3	1	▲2	93.9	47.5	10,255	
Conservative	2	1	0	▲1	6.1	26.1	5,625	
Independent	0	0	0	Steady	0.0	14.9	3,219	
Green	0	0	0	Steady	0.0	7.4	1,604	
Liberal Democrats	0	0	0	Steady	0.0	4.0	871	

All comparisons in vote share are to the corresponding 1995 election.

== Ward results ==
=== Abbey ===
Location of Abbey ward

Abbey
Party	Candidate	Votes	%
Labour	Alan Darley	758	
Labour	Peter West	753	
Labour	Fay Smith	704	
Independent	J. Robertson	289	
Conservative	S. Grice	280	
Green	A. Smith	256	
Turnout			23.6%
Labour win (new seat)			
Labour win (new seat)			
Labour win (new seat)			

=== Birchwood ===
Location of Birchwood ward

Birchwood
Party	Candidate	Votes	%
Labour	Stephen Allnutt	675	
Labour	Lynne Gray	566	
Conservative	Edmund Strengiel	556	
Labour	W. Duncan	548	
Independent	A. Maddox	407	
Independent	B. Freeborough	407	
Independent	G. Priddey	317	
Turnout			28.4%
Labour win (new seat)			
Labour win (new seat)			
Conservative win (new seat)			

=== Boultham ===
Location of Boultham ward

Boultham
Party	Candidate	Votes	%
Labour	T. Rook	1,151	
Labour	Gary Hewson	1,117	
Labour	Ralph Toofany	1,107	
Independent	M. Skeels	510	
Conservative	D. Braithwaite	465	
Green	B. Alford	257	
Turnout			32.3%
Labour win (new seat)			
Labour win (new seat)			
Labour win (new seat)			

=== Bracebridge ===
Location of Bracebridge ward

Bracebridge
Party	Candidate	Votes	%
Labour	Bud Robinson	1,179	
Labour	P. Taylor	957	
Labour	A. Taylor	950	
Conservative	Darren Grice	705	
Conservative	Hilton Spratt	696	
Green	G. Phillips	365	
Independent	R. Wells	280	
Turnout			32.1%
Labour win (new seat)			
Labour win (new seat)			
Labour win (new seat)			

=== Carholme ===
Location of Carholme ward

Carholme
Party	Candidate	Votes	%
Labour	Sharon Clark	899	
Labour	Lesley Rose	818	
Labour	Neil Murray	807	
Liberal Democrats	L. Gabriel	553	
Conservative	Sandra Gratrick	427	
Green	D. Kane	297	
Green	N. Watson	292	
Turnout			31.8%
Labour win (new seat)			
Labour win (new seat)			
Labour win (new seat)			

=== Castle ===
Location of Castle ward

Castle
Party	Candidate	Votes	%
Labour	Anthony Morgan	959	
Labour	Loraine Woolley	863	
Labour	Donald Nannestad	853	
Conservative	P. Mappin	367	
Green	K. Stephenson	226	
Independent	A. Wenham	175	
Turnout			28.1%
Labour win (new seat)			
Labour win (new seat)			
Labour win (new seat)			

=== Glebe ===
Location of Glebe ward

Glebe
Party	Candidate	Votes	%
Labour	Richard Metcalfe	1,076	
Labour	Jerome O'Brien	911	
Labour	Lawrence Wells	883	
Conservative	J. Gainey	455	
Independent	T. Clark	267	
Turnout			27.4%
Labour win (new seat)			
Labour win (new seat)			
Labour win (new seat)			

=== Hartsholme ===
Location of Hartsholme ward

Hartsholme
Party	Candidate	Votes	%
Labour	Christopher Grimshaw	870	
Labour	Richard Coupland	860	
Conservative	Ronald Hills	852	
Labour	L. Burke	779	
Independent	R. Hall	682	
Turnout			29.7%
Labour win (new seat)			
Labour win (new seat)			
Conservative win (new seat)			

=== Minster ===
Location of Minster ward

Minster
Party	Candidate	Votes	%
Labour	Morris Cookson	878	
Labour	P. McGinlay	836	
Labour	M. Schofield	762	
Conservative	David Gratrick	721	
Independent	P. Wilkinson	418	
Independent	J. Humphries	363	
Turnout			33.4%
Labour win (new seat)			
Labour win (new seat)			
Labour win (new seat)			

=== Moorland ===
Location of Moorland ward

Moorland
Party	Candidate	Votes	%
Labour	Geoffrey Ellis	1,021	
Labour	Martin Bushell	894	
Labour	Denise Moore	841	
Conservative	D. Fraser	512	
Independent	D. Priddey	191	
Turnout			27.7%
Labour win (new seat)			
Labour win (new seat)			
Labour win (new seat)			

=== Park ===
Location of Park ward

Park
Party	Candidate	Votes	%
Labour	David Jackson	789	
Labour	M. Theaker	678	
Labour	Patrick Vaughan	614	
Liberal Democrats	D. Paton	318	
Conservative	P. Brooks	285	
Green	K. Yates	203	
Turnout			22.0%
Labour win (new seat)			
Labour win (new seat)			
Labour win (new seat)			
