= 1998 City of Lincoln Council election =

1998 UK local government election

| ← 1996 | 7 May 1998 | 1999 → |

11 of the 33 seats to City of Lincoln Council 17 seats needed for a majority
| | First party | Second party | Third party |
|---|---|---|---|
| Party | Labour | Independent Labour | Conservative |
| Last election | 33 | 0 | 0 |
| Seats before | 26 | 7 | 7 |
| Seats won | 10 | 1 | 1 |
| Seats after | 29 | 3 | 1 |
| Seat change | ▼1 | ▼4 | ▲1 |
| Popular vote | 9,994 | 4,811 | 4,811 |
| Percentage | 59.6% | 28.7% | 28.7% |
- Map showing the results of the 1998 Lincoln City Council elections by ward. Red shows Labour seats and blue shows Conservative seats.
Council control before election
Labour
Council control after election
Labour

An election took place on 7 May 1998 to elect members of Lincoln District Council in Lincolnshire, England. One third of the council was up for election and the Labour Party stayed in overall control of the Council.

After the 1996 election the Labour Party held all of the seats on the council but before the 1998 election 7 councillors broke away to sit as Independent Labour councillors.

After the election, the composition of the council was:

- Labour 28
- Independent Labour 3
- Conservative 1
- Vacant 1

== Election result ==
Lincoln local election result 1998
| Party | Seats | Gains | Losses | Net gain/loss | Seats % | Votes % | Votes | +/− |
|---|---|---|---|---|---|---|---|---|
| Labour | 10 | 3 | 0 | ▲3 | 90.9 | 59.6 | 9,994 | ▼9.1 |
| Conservative | 1 | 1 | 0 | ▲1 | 9.1 | 28.7 | 4,811 | ▲4.0 |
| Independent Labour | 0 | 0 | 4 | ▼4 | 0.0 | 6.3 | 1,051 | ▲5.5 |
| Total | 11 | | | | | | 16,776 | |

All comparisons in vote share are to the corresponding 1994 election.

== Ward results ==
=== Abbey ===
Location of Abbey ward

Abbey
| Party | Candidate | Votes | % |
|---|---|---|---|
| Labour | Fay Smith | 649 | 57.7% |
| Conservative | P. Forbes-Ritte | 170 | 15.1% |
| Independent Labour | F. Martin | 154 | 13.7% |
| Liberal Democrats | J. Price | 152 | 13.5% |
| Turnout | | | 21.4% |
| Labour gain from Independent Labour | | | |

=== Birchwood ===
Location of Birchwood ward

Birchwood
| Party | Candidate | Votes | % |
|---|---|---|---|
| Conservative | Edmund Strengiel | 1,040 | 37.7% |
| Labour | G. Priddey | 954 | 34.6% |
| Independent Labour | B. Freeborough | 765 | 27.7% |
| Turnout | | | 26.9% |
| Conservative gain from Independent Labour | | | |

=== Boultham ===
Location of Boultham ward

Boultham
| Party | Candidate | Votes | % |
|---|---|---|---|
| Labour | Gary Hewson | 966 | 71.4% |
| Conservative | D. Grice | 251 | 18.6% |
| Green | J. Hayes | 136 | 10.1% |
| Turnout | | | 25.0% |
| Labour hold | | | |

=== Bracebridge ===
Location of Bracebridge ward

Bracebridge
| Party | Candidate | Votes | % |
|---|---|---|---|
| Labour | Bud Robinson | 1,078 | 70.7% |
| Conservative | A. Simpson | 447 | 29.3% |
| Turnout | | | 25.1% |
| Labour hold | | | |

=== Carholme ===
Location of Carholme ward

Carholme
| Party | Candidate | Votes | % |
|---|---|---|---|
| Labour | Lesley Rose | 883 | 56.3% |
| Liberal Democrats | L. Gabriel | 356 | 22.7% |
| Conservative | Sandra Gratrick | 330 | 21.0% |
| Turnout | | | 28.7% |
| Labour hold | | | |

=== Castle ===
Location of Castle ward

Castle
| Party | Candidate | Votes | % |
|---|---|---|---|
| Labour | Donald Nannestad | 1,062 | 73.5% |
| Conservative | P. Mappin | 382 | 26.5% |
| Turnout | | | 27.4% |
| Labour hold | | | |

=== Longdales ===
Location of Longdales ward

Longdales
| Party | Candidate | Votes | % |
|---|---|---|---|
| Labour | Morris Cookson | 865 | 63.0% |
| Conservative | David Gratrick | 509 | 37.0% |
| Turnout | | | 29.5% |
| Labour hold | | | |

=== Minster ===
Location of Minster ward

Minster
| Party | Candidate | Votes | % |
|---|---|---|---|
| Labour | Richard Metcalfe | 1,235 | 57.2% |
| Conservative | J. Gainey | 706 | 32.7% |
| Green | L. Monds | 217 | 10.1% |
| Turnout | | | 29.3% |
| Labour hold | | | |

=== Moorland ===
Location of Moorland ward

Moorland
| Party | Candidate | Votes | % |
|---|---|---|---|
| Labour | Geoffrey Ellis | 886 | 61.8% |
| Conservative | D. Fraser | 415 | 29.0% |
| Independent Labour | D. Martin | 132 | 9.2% |
| Turnout | | | 29.2% |
| Labour hold | | | |

=== Park ===
Location of Park ward

Park
| Party | Candidate | Votes | % |
|---|---|---|---|
| Labour | Patrick Vaughan | 658 | 68.1% |
| Conservative | B. Briggs | 249 | 25.8% |
| Green | K. Yates | 59 | 6.1% |
| Turnout | | | 20.3% |
| Labour hold | | | |

=== Tritton ===
Location of Tritton ward

Tritton
| Party | Candidate | Votes | % |
|---|---|---|---|
| Labour | Denise Moore | 758 | 70.8% |
| Conservative | R. Hills | 312 | 29.2% |
| Turnout | | | 25.1% |
| Labour hold | | | |

== By-elections between 1998 and 1999 ==
Park By-Election 2 July 1998
| Party | Candidate | Votes | % | ±% |
|---|---|---|---|---|
| Labour | | 416 | 52.1 | ▼28.5 |
| Conservative | | 156 | 19.5 | ▲5.8 |
| Liberal Democrats | | 112 | 14.0 | ▲14.0 |
| Independent | | 93 | 11.7 | ▲11.7 |
| Green | | 21 | 2.6 | ▼3.1 |
| Majority | | 260 | 32.6 | |
| Turnout | | 798 | | |
| Labour hold | | Swing | | |
