= 1994 City of Lincoln Council election =

Election held in City of Lincoln Council in 1994

← 1992	5 May 1994	1995 →

11 of the 33 seats to City of Lincoln Council 17 seats needed for a majority
	First party	Second party
Party	Labour	Conservative
Last election	30	3
Seats won	11	0
Seats after	30	3
Seat change	Steady	Steady
Popular vote	15,229	5,480
Percentage	68.7%	24.7%
- Map showing the results of the 1994 Lincoln City Council elections by ward. Red shows Labour seats and blue shows Conservative seats.
Council control before election
Labour
Council control after election
Labour

The 1994 City of Lincoln Council election took place on 5 May 1994. This was on the same day as other local elections. One third of the council was up for election: the seats of which were last contested in 1990. The Labour Party retained control of the council.

== Overall results ==
1994 City of Lincoln Council Election
Party	Seats	Gains	Losses	Net gain/loss	Seats %	Votes %	Votes	+/−
Labour	11	0	0	Steady	100.0	68.7	15,229	▲3.2
Conservative	0	0	0	Steady	0.0	24.7	5,480	▼3.4
Liberal Democrats	0	0	0	Steady	0.0	1.3	285	New
Green	0	0	0	Steady	0.0	4.5	989	▼1.0
Independent Labour	0	0	0	Steady	0.0	0.8	175	New
Total	11						22,158	

All comparisons in vote share are to the corresponding 1990 election.

== Ward results ==
=== Abbey ===
Location of Abbey ward

Abbey
Party	Candidate	Votes	%
Labour	F. Martin	1,420	83.3%
Conservative	M. Kaye	284	16.7%
Turnout			33.1%
Labour hold			

=== Birchwood ===
Location of Birchwood ward

Birchwood
Party	Candidate	Votes	%
Labour	B. Freeborough	2,047	57.8%
Conservative	M. Mellows	1,496	42.2%
Turnout			35.2%
Labour hold			

=== Boultham ===
Location of Boultham ward

Boultham
Party	Candidate	Votes	%
Labour	Gary Hewson	1,321	67.5%
Conservative	P. Daly	285	14.6%
Liberal Democrats	D. Paton	277	14.1%
Green	P. North	75	3.8%
Turnout			37.4%
Labour hold			

=== Bracebridge ===
Location of Bracebridge ward

Bracebridge
Party	Candidate	Votes	%
Labour	Bud Robinson	1,643	72.7%
Conservative	D. Fraser	616	27.3%
Turnout			37.8%
Labour hold			

=== Carholme ===
Location of Carholme ward

Carholme
Party	Candidate	Votes	%
Labour	L. Vaisey	1,311	58.0%
Conservative	I. Galinski	477	21.1%
Green	D. Kane	298	13.2%
Independent Labour	L. Nottingham	175	7.7%
Turnout			41.1%
Labour hold			

=== Castle ===
Location of Castle ward

Castle
Party	Candidate	Votes	%
Labour	Donald Nannestad	1,532	73.2%
Conservative	Y. Sampson	408	19.5%
Green	B. Alford	152	7.3%
Turnout			38.2%
Labour hold			

=== Longdales ===
Location of Longdales ward

Longdales
Party	Candidate	Votes	%
Labour	N. Haigh	1,448	73.8%
Conservative	P. Farrow	514	26.2%
Turnout			40.6%
Labour hold			

=== Minster ===
Location of Minster ward

Minster
Party	Candidate	Votes	%
Labour	Richard Metcalfe	1,924	66.6%
Conservative	A. Grant	766	26.5%
Green	S. Harriman	201	7.0%
Turnout			%
Labour hold			

=== Moorland ===
Location of Moorland ward

Moorland
Party	Candidate	Votes	%
Labour	Geoffrey Ellis	1,489	69.9%
Conservative	R. Meads	642	30.1%
Turnout			42.5%
Labour hold			

=== Park ===
Location of Park ward

Park
Party	Candidate	Votes	%
Labour	Adelle Ellis	1,094	80.6%
Green	K. Yates	263	19.4%
Turnout			26.5%
Labour hold			

=== Tritton ===
Location of Tritton ward

Tritton
Party	Candidate	Votes	%
Labour	C. Meanwell		
Turnout			
Labour hold			
