= 2004 City of Lincoln Council election =

English political election

← 2003	10 June 2004	2006 →

11 of the 33 seats to City of Lincoln Council 17 seats needed for a majority
	First party	Second party	Third party
Party	Labour	Conservative	Liberal Democrats
Last election	27	6	0
Seats won	5	5	1
Seats after	25	7	1
Seat change	▼2	▲1	▲1
Popular vote	9,450	9,689	3,211
Percentage	39.2%	40.2%	13.3%
- Map showing the results of the 2004 Lincoln City Council elections by ward. Red shows Labour seats, blue shows Conservative seats and orange shows Liberal Democrat seats.
Council control before election
Labour
Council control after election
Labour

Elections to City of Lincoln Council in Lincolnshire, England, were held on 10 June 2004. One third of the council was up for election and the Labour Party stayed in overall control of the council.

After the election, the composition of the council was:

- Labour 25
- Conservative 7
- Liberal Democrat 1

== Election result ==
Lincoln local election result 2004
Party	Seats	Gains	Losses	Net gain/loss	Seats %	Votes %	Votes	+/−
Conservative	5	1	0	▲1	45.5	40.2	9,689	▲4.4
Labour	5	0	2	▼2	45.5	39.2	9,450	▼12.3
Liberal Democrats	1	1	0	▲1	9.1	13.3	3,211	▲10.4
Lincoln Independent Alliance	0	0	0	Steady	0.0	5.0	1,218	▼0.2
Socialist Alternative	0	0	0	Steady	0.0	1.4	329	▲1.4
Independent	0	0	0	Steady	0.0	0.9	222	▼1.3

All comparisons in vote share are to the corresponding 2000 election.

== Ward results ==
=== Abbey ===
Location of Abbey ward

Abbey
Party	Candidate	Votes	%
Labour	Fay Smith	703	42.1
Liberal Democrats	John Margetts	489	29.3
Conservative	Anne Duguid	479	28.7
Majority		214	12.8
Turnout		1,671	40.0%
Labour hold			

=== Birchwood ===
Location of Birchwood ward

Birchwood
Party	Candidate	Votes	%
Conservative	Edmund Strengiel	1,015	48.3
Labour	Julie Cooper	756	36.0
Socialist Alternative	Ryan Hayward	329	15.7
Majority		259	12.3
Turnout		2,100	38.9%
Conservative hold			

=== Boultham ===
Location of Boultham ward

Boultham
Party	Candidate	Votes	%
Labour	Amode Toofany	979	43.5
Liberal Democrats	Jayne Fisk	637	28.3
Conservative	Darius Laws	635	28.2
Majority		342	15.2
Turnout		2,251	41.4%
Labour hold			

=== Bracebridge ===
Location of Bracebridge ward

Bracebridge
Party	Candidate	Votes	%
Conservative	Hilton Spratt	1,575	59.0
Labour	Kevin Parnham	1,093	41.0
Majority		482	18.0
Turnout		2,668	43.3%
Conservative hold			

=== Carholme ===
Location of Carholme ward

Carholme
Party	Candidate	Votes	%
Labour	Neil Murray	767	36.6
Liberal Democrats	Charles Shaw	596	28.5
Conservative	Jayne Harris	509	24.3
Independent	Peter McGovern	222	10.6
Majority		171	8.1
Turnout		2,094	45.4%
Labour hold			

=== Castle ===
Location of Castle ward

Castle
Party	Candidate	Votes	%
Labour	Donald Nannestad	790	40.7
Conservative	Michael Reeve	426	21.9
Liberal Democrats	Phillip Mappin	372	19.2
Lincoln Independent Alliance	Richard Hall	353	18.2
Majority		364	18.8
Turnout		1,941	42.1%
Labour hold			

=== Glebe ===
Location of Glebe ward

Glebe
Party	Candidate	Votes	%
Labour	Lawrence Wells	926	38.2
Lincoln Independent Alliance	George Spencer	865	35.7
Conservative	Geoffrey Brooking	634	26.1
Majority		61	2.5
Turnout		2,425	45.4%
Labour hold			

=== Hartsholme ===
Location of Hartsholme ward

Hartsholme
Party	Candidate	Votes	%
Conservative	Ronald Hills	1,710	63.7
Labour	Elizabeth Jones	973	36.3
Majority		737	27.4
Turnout		2,683	41.6%
Conservative hold			

=== Minster ===
Location of Minster ward

Minster
Party	Candidate	Votes	%
Conservative	David Gratrick	1,099	46.2
Labour	Winston Duncan	760	32.0
Liberal Democrats	Daphne Shaw	518	21.8
Majority		339	14.2
Turnout		2,377	46.1%
Conservative hold			

=== Moorland ===
Location of Moorland ward

Moorland
Party	Candidate	Votes	%
Conservative	David Bellamy	1,181	51.4
Labour	Denise Moore	1,117	48.6
Majority		64	2.8
Turnout		2,298	41.6%
Conservative hold			

=== Park ===
Location of Park ward

Park
Party	Candidate	Votes	%
Liberal Democrats	Heather Quinton	599	37.2
Labour	Patrick Vaughan	586	36.4
Conservative	Paul Grice	426	26.4
Majority		13	0.8
Turnout		1,611	33.5%
Liberal Democrats hold			
