= 2006 City of Lincoln Council election =

2006 UK local government election

← 2004	4 May 2006	2007 →

11 of the 33 seats to City of Lincoln Council 17 seats needed for a majority
	First party	Second party	Third party
Party	Labour	Conservative	Liberal Democrats
Last election	25	7	1
Seats won	4	6	1
Seats after	20	11	2
Seat change	▼5	▲4	▲1
Popular vote	7,063	7,693	1,371
Percentage	40.1%	43.6%	7.8%
- Map showing the results of the 2006 Lincoln City Council elections by ward. Red shows Labour seats, blue shows Conservative seats and orange shows Liberal Democrat seats.
Council control before election
Labour
Council control after election
Labour

Elections to City of Lincoln Council in Lincolnshire, England, were held on 4 May 2006. One third of the Council was up for election and the Labour Party stayed in overall control of the Council.

After the election, the composition of the council was:

- Labour 20
- Conservative 11
- Liberal Democrat 2

== Election result ==
Lincoln local election result 2006
Party	Seats	Gains	Losses	Net gain/loss	Seats %	Votes %	Votes	+/−
Conservative	6	4	0	▲4	54.5	43.6	7,693	▲17.0
Labour	4	0	5	▼5	36.4	40.1	7,063	▼16.0
Liberal Democrats	1	1	0	▲1	9.1	7.8	1,371	New
UKIP	0	0	0	Steady	0.0	8.5	1,506	New
Total	11						17,633	

All comparisons in vote share are to the corresponding 2002 election.

== Ward results ==
=== Abbey ===
Location of Abbey ward

Abbey
Party	Candidate	Votes	%
Labour	Peter West	716	61.8%
Conservative	John Woolf	443	38.2%
Majority		273	23.6%
Turnout		1,159	25.3%
Labour hold			

=== Birchwood ===
Location of Birchwood ward

Birchwood
Party	Candidate	Votes	%
Conservative	John Metcalfe	810	48.2%
Labour	Lynne Gray	577	34.4%
UKIP	Anthony Wells	292	17.4%
Majority		233	13.8%
Turnout		1,679	29.2%
Conservative hold			

=== Boultham ===
Location of Boultham ward

Boultham
Party	Candidate	Votes	%
Labour	Gary Hewson	819	51.4%
Conservative	Oliver Peeke	542	34.0%
UKIP	Malcolm Skeels	233	14.6%
Majority		277	17.4%
Turnout		1,594	28.8%
Labour hold			

=== Bracebridge ===
Location of Bracebridge ward

Bracebridge
Party	Candidate	Votes	%
Conservative	Darren Grice	1,209	62.0%
Labour	David Rimmington	740	38.0%
Majority		469	24.0%
Turnout		1,949	31.1%
Conservative hold			

=== Carholme ===
Location of Carholme ward

Carholme
Party	Candidate	Votes	%
Labour	Lesley Rose	594	37.0%
Liberal Democrats	Charles Shaw	551	34.4%
Conservative	Valerie Kirby	459	28.6%
Majority		43	2.6%
Turnout		1,604	30.4%
Labour hold			

=== Castle ===
Location of Castle ward

Castle
Party	Candidate	Votes	%
Labour	Loraine Woolley	690	51.5%
Conservative	Adrian Birks	440	32.8%
UKIP	Peter Sharpe	211	15.7%
Majority		250	18.7%
Turnout		1,341	27.5%
Labour hold			

=== Glebe ===
Location of Glebe ward

Glebe
Party	Candidate	Votes	%
Conservative	Claire Metcalfe	586	34.6%
Labour	Julian Gadd	566	33.5%
Liberal Democrats	Roy Harris	338	20.0%
UKIP	Jamie Corney	202	11.9%
Majority		20	1.1%
Turnout		1,692	26.0%
Conservative gain from Labour			

=== Hartsholme ===
Location of Hartsholme ward

Hartsholme
Party	Candidate	Votes	%
Conservative	Geoffrey Kirby	1,038	50.3%
Labour	Winston Duncan	634	30.7%
UKIP	Nicola Smith	391	19.0%
Majority		404	19.6%
Turnout		2,063	30.6%
Conservative hold			

=== Minster ===
Location of Minster ward

Minster
Party	Candidate	Votes	%
Conservative	Sandra Gratrick	963	52.2%
Labour	Patrick Vaughan	706	38.2%
UKIP	Nicholas Smith	177	9.6%
Majority		257	14.0%
Turnout		1,846	34.8%
Conservative hold			

=== Moorland ===
Location of Moorland ward

Moorland
Party	Candidate	Votes	%
Conservative	Paul Grice	899	55.8%
Labour	Martin Bushell	713	44.2%
Majority		186	11.6%
Turnout		1,612	28.4%
Conservative gain from Labour			

=== Park ===
Location of Park ward

Park
Party	Candidate	Votes	%
Liberal Democrats	Ryan Cullen	482	44.1%
Labour	Malcolm Withers	308	28.2%
Conservative	Jayne Heaton-Harris	304	27.8%
Majority		174	15.9%
Turnout		1,094	21.8%
Liberal Democrats gain from Labour			

== By-elections between 2006 and 2008 ==
Moorland By-Election 29 June 2006
Party	Candidate	Votes	%	±%
Conservative	Oliver Garbutt Peeke	640	39.9	▼15.9
Labour	Martin Bushell	569	35.5	▼8.7
BNP	Philip Marshall	254	15.8	▲15.8
Liberal Democrats	John Price	96	6.0	▲6.0
UKIP	Nicholas Smith	46	2.9	▲2.9
Majority		71	4.4	
Turnout		1,605	28.1	
Labour gain from Conservative		Swing		
