= 1984 City of Lincoln Council election =

Election held in City of Lincoln Council in 1984

← 1983	3 May 1984	1986 →

11 of the 33 seats to City of Lincoln Council 17 seats needed for a majority
	First party	Second party
Party	Labour	Conservative
Last election	23	10
Seats won	9	2
Seats after	25	8
Seat change	▲2	▼2
Popular vote	13,268	9,554
Percentage	54.0%	38.9%
- Map showing the results of the 1984 Lincoln City Council elections by ward. Red shows Labour seats and blue shows the Conservatives seats.
Council control before election
Labour
Council control after election
Labour

The 1984 City of Lincoln Council election took place on 3 May 1984. This was on the same day as other local elections. One third of the council was up for election: the seats of which were last contested in 1980. The Labour Party retained control of the council.

== Overall results ==
1984 City of Lincoln Council Election
Party	Seats	Gains	Losses	Net gain/loss	Seats %	Votes %	Votes	+/−
Labour	9	2	0	▲2	81.8	54.0	13,268	▲10.7
Conservative	2	0	2	▼2	18.2	38.9	9,554	▲1.0
Alliance	0	0	0	Steady	0.0	5.8	1,426	▼4.2
Ecology	0	0	0	Steady	0.0	0.6	142	▲0.2
Ind. Conservative	0	0	0	Steady	0.0	0.8	202	New
Total	11						24,592	

All comparisons in vote share are to the corresponding 1980 election.

== Ward results ==
=== Abbey ===
Location of Abbey ward

Abbey
Party	Candidate	Votes	%
Labour	J. Robertson	1,339	66.0%
Conservative	J. Frost	691	34.0%
Turnout			37.3%
Labour hold			

=== Birchwood ===
Location of Birchwood ward

Boultham
Party	Candidate	Votes	%
Labour	Wright	1,183	56.0%
Conservative	Cumberhulme	929	44.0%
Turnout			35.0%
Labour hold			

=== Boultham ===
Location of Boultham ward

Boultham
Party	Candidate	Votes	%
Labour	Ralph Toofany	1,276	49.9%
Conservative	P. Samways	958	37.5%
Alliance	Addlesee	257	10.1%
Ecology	C. Moulton	64	2.5%
Turnout			51.3%
Labour hold			

=== Bracebridge ===
Location of Bracebridge ward

Bracebridge
Party	Candidate	Votes	%
Conservative	Phoenix	917	38.2%
Labour	Fipperd	887	36.9%
Alliance	Robins	397	16.5%
Ind. Conservative	P. Roe	202	8.4%
Turnout			41.1%
Conservative hold			

=== Carholme ===
Location of Carholme ward

Carholme
Party	Candidate	Votes	%
Conservative	C. Ireland	1,278	51.0%
Labour	Parker	1,229	49.0%
Turnout			45.6%
Conservative hold			

=== Castle ===
Location of Castle ward

Castle
Party	Candidate	Votes	%
Labour	Withers	1,433	66.1%
Conservative	M. Mellows	736	33.9%
Turnout			41.4%
Labour gain from Conservative			

=== Longdales ===
Location of Longdales ward

Longdales
Party	Candidate	Votes	%
Labour	D. Miller	1,390	59.1%
Conservative	R. Long	963	40.9%
Turnout			48.5%
Labour hold			

=== Minster ===
Location of Minster ward

Minster
Party	Candidate	Votes	%
Labour	Courtney	1,419	47.8%
Conservative	Horn	1,215	40.9%
Alliance	Feeney	337	11.3%
Turnout			48.2%
Labour gain from Conservative			

=== Moorland ===
Location of Moorland ward

Moorland
Party	Candidate	Votes	%
Labour	N. Baldock	880	44.4%
Conservative	Keat	665	33.6%
Alliance	Tromans	435	22.0%
Turnout			39.7%
Labour hold			

=== Park ===
Location of Park ward

Park
Party	Candidate	Votes	%
Labour	J. Plant	1,010	61.3%
Alliance	Adams	559	33.9%
Ecology	K. Yates	78	4.7%
Turnout			33.0%
Labour hold			

=== Tritton ===
Location of Tritton ward

Tritton
Party	Candidate	Votes	%
Labour	H. Hubbard	1,222	65.5%
Conservative	Spratt	643	34.5%
Turnout			43.0%
Labour hold			
