= 1973 City of Lincoln Council election =

7 June 1973	1976 →

All 30 seats to City of Lincoln Council 16 seats needed for a majority
	First party	Second party	Third party
Party	Democratic Labour	Conservative	Independent
Seats won	20	6	2
Popular vote	8,660	6,062	997
Percentage	39.8%	27.9%	4.6%
	Fourth party	Fifth party
Party	Labour	Ind. Conservative
Seats won	1	1
Popular vote	5,469	544
Percentage	25.2%	2.0%
Council control after election
Democratic Labour

The 1973 City of Lincoln Council election were the first elections to the newly created City of Lincoln Council and took place on 7 June 1973. This was on the same day as other local elections. The Local Government Act 1972 stipulated that the elected members were to shadow and eventually take over from the predecessor corporation on 1 April 1974. The election resulted in the Democratic Labour Party gaining control of the council.

== Overall results ==
1973 City of Lincoln Council Election
Party	Seats	Gains	Losses	Net gain/loss	Seats %	Votes %	Votes	+/−
Democratic Labour	20	n/a	n/a	n/a	66.7	39.8	8,660	n/a
Conservative	6	n/a	n/a	n/a	20.0	27.9	6,062	n/a
Independent	2	n/a	n/a	n/a	6.7	4.6	997	n/a
Labour	1	n/a	n/a	n/a	3.3	25.2	5,469	n/a
Ind. Conservative	1	n/a	n/a	n/a	3.3	2.0	997	n/a
Total	30						21,732	

== Ward results ==
=== Abbey (3 seats) ===
Abbey (3 seats)
Party	Candidate	Votes	%
Democratic Labour	B. Ashmore	915	
Democratic Labour	N. Marshall	911	
Democratic Labour	K. Carveth	897	
Labour	Roussel	638	
Labour	Wright	612	
Labour	Wadsworth	592	
Conservative	Kendall	426	
Conservative	Baldwin	415	
Turnout			37.6%
Democratic Labour win (new seat)			
Democratic Labour win (new seat)			
Democratic Labour win (new seat)			

=== Boultham (3 seats) ===
Boultham (3 seats)
Party	Candidate	Votes	%
Democratic Labour	T. Rook	790	
Ind. Conservative	W. Pixsley	544	
Labour	J. Ward	480	
Conservative	Bean	479	
Labour	Jackson	424	
Labour	Maclaughlan	421	
Ind. Conservative	Carradice	420	
Turnout			41.5%
Democratic Labour win (new seat)			
Ind. Conservative win (new seat)			
Labour win (new seat)			

=== Bracebridge (3 seats) ===
Bracebridge (3 seats)
Party	Candidate	Votes	%
Democratic Labour	Judge	925	
Democratic Labour	D. Colam	836	
Democratic Labour	R. Brittan	825	
Conservative	R. Bracey	663	
Conservative	A. Roe	656	
Conservative	P. Roe	630	
Labour	Barlow	329	
Labour	Baldock	289	
Labour	Pawson	258	
Turnout			36.5%
Democratic Labour win (new seat)			
Democratic Labour win (new seat)			
Democratic Labour win (new seat)			

=== Carholme (3 seats) ===
Carholme (3 seats)
Party	Candidate	Votes	%
Conservative	N. Spence	872	
Conservative	I. Campbell	794	
Conservative	Lyall	792	
Democratic Labour	Shaw	695	
Democratic Labour	M. Smalec	690	
Democratic Labour	M. Marshall	688	
Labour	Lynn	323	
Labour	McHugh	282	
Labour	Weir	271	
Turnout			38.9%
Conservative win (new seat)			
Conservative win (new seat)			
Conservative win (new seat)			

=== Castle (3 seats) ===
Castle (3 seats)
Party	Candidate	Votes	%
Independent	Eccleshare	997	
Conservative	C. Robinson	813	
Independent	Blackbourn	758	
Conservative	Ireland	529	
Conservative	Long	509	
Labour	Tracey	426	
Labour	Hodson	398	
Labour	Thompson	383	
Turnout			39.3%
Independent win (new seat)			
Conservative win (new seat)			
Independent win (new seat)			

=== Ermine (3 seats) ===
Ermine (3 seats)
Party	Candidate	Votes	%
Democratic Labour	R. Barnes	1,278	
Democratic Labour	D. Chambers	1,208	
Democratic Labour	Kent	1,107	
Labour	Naftalin	909	
Labour	Middleton	844	
Labour	L. Vaisey	755	
Conservative	Chester	384	
Conservative	Cowton	382	
Conservative	Weaver	317	
Turnout			37.3%
Democratic Labour win (new seat)			
Democratic Labour win (new seat)			
Democratic Labour win (new seat)			

=== Hartsholme (3 seats) ===
Hartsholme (3 seats)
Party	Candidate	Votes	%
Democratic Labour	M. Richardson	971	
Democratic Labour	J. Bates	923	
Democratic Labour	Hallows	877	
Labour	Gardiner	635	
Labour	Barnes	537	
Labour	Baker	484	
Conservative	Godley	309	
Conservative	Bamford	308	
Conservative	Ranshaw	292	
Turnout			35.9%
Democratic Labour win (new seat)			
Democratic Labour win (new seat)			
Democratic Labour win (new seat)			

=== Minster (3 seats) ===
Minster (3 seats)
Party	Candidate	Votes	%
Conservative	Sookias	1,298	
Democratic Labour	C. Wilkinson	1,108	
Conservative	J. Sullivan	1,062	
Conservative	F. Horn	1,058	
Democratic Labour	G. Thornborrow	832	
Democratic Labour	Strangeway	820	
Labour	Miller	520	
Labour	Bennett	502	
Labour	Dawson	491	
Turnout			45.6%
Conservative win (new seat)			
Democratic Labour win (new seat)			
Conservative win (new seat)			

=== Moorland (3 seats) ===
Moorland (3 seats)
Party	Candidate	Votes	%
Democratic Labour	Ford	1,111	
Democratic Labour	R. Beecham	1,104	
Democratic Labour	Galjaard	1,066	
Labour	Brown	805	
Labour	J. Robertson	664	
Labour	Plant	603	
Conservative	Richards	554	
Turnout			34.1%
Democratic Labour win (new seat)			
Democratic Labour win (new seat)			
Democratic Labour win (new seat)			

=== Park (3 seats) ===
Park (3 seats)
Party	Candidate	Votes	%
Democratic Labour	F. Allen	867	
Democratic Labour	L. Shepheard	720	
Democratic Labour	Copley	696	
Labour	Archer	404	
Labour	Herbert	383	
Labour	Jackson	291	
Conservative	Rowley	264	
Turnout			32.6%
Democratic Labour win (new seat)			
Democratic Labour win (new seat)			
Democratic Labour win (new seat)			
