= 1988 City of Lincoln Council election =

Election held in City of Lincoln Council in 1988

← 1987	5 May 1988	1990 →

11 of the 33 seats to City of Lincoln Council 17 seats needed for a majority
	First party	Second party
Party	Labour	Conservative
Last election	25	7
Seats won	10	1
Seats after	27	6
Seat change	▲2	▼2
Popular vote	15,071	9,892
Percentage	60.2%	39.5%
- Map showing the results of the 1988 Lincoln City Council elections by ward. Red shows Labour seats and blue shows Conservative seats.
Council control before election
Labour
Council control after election
Labour

The 1988 City of Lincoln Council election took place on 5 May 1988. This was on the same day as other local elections. One third of the council was up for election: the seats of which were last contested in 1984. The Labour Party retained control of the council.

== Overall results ==
1988 City of Lincoln Council Election
Party	Seats	Gains	Losses	Net gain/loss	Seats %	Votes %	Votes	+/−
Labour	10	2	0	▲2	90.9	60.2	15,071	▲6.2
Conservative	1	0	2	▼2	9.1	39.5	9,892	▼0.6
Other parties	0	0	0	Steady	0.0	0.2	54	▼7.0
Total	11						25,017	

All comparisons in vote share are to the corresponding 1984 election.

== Ward results ==
=== Abbey ===
Location of Abbey ward

Abbey
Party	Candidate	Votes	%
Labour	J. Robertson	1,492	79.8%
Conservative	C. Sanderson	377	20.2%
Turnout			38.3%
Labour hold			

=== Birchwood ===
Location of Birchwood ward

Birchwood
Party	Candidate	Votes	%
Conservative	W. Crumblehulme	1,336	51.2%
Labour	B. Fippard	1,275	48.8%
Turnout			29.9%
Labour hold			

=== Boultham ===
Location of Boultham ward

Boultham
Party	Candidate	Votes	%
Labour	Ralph Toofany	1,432	68.5%
Conservative	W. Pixsley	657	31.5%
Turnout			41.0%
Labour hold			

=== Bracebridge ===
Location of Bracebridge ward

Bracebridge
Party	Candidate	Votes	%
Labour	A. Bradley	1,312	54.4%
Conservative	F. Hanson	1,100	45.6%
Turnout			40.0%
Labour gain from Conservative			

=== Carholme ===
Location of Carholme ward

Carholme
Party	Candidate	Votes	%
Labour	S. Paterson	1,287	54.3%
Conservative	C. Ireland	1,031	43.5%
Other parties	T. Kyle	54	2.3%
Turnout			43.8%
Labour gain from Conservative			

=== Castle ===
Location of Castle ward

Castle
Party	Candidate	Votes	%
Labour	Loraine Woolley	1,422	63.8%
Conservative	J. Fawcett	806	36.2%
Turnout			41.7%
Labour hold			

=== Longdales ===
Location of Longdales ward

Longdales
Party	Candidate	Votes	%
Labour	D. Miller	1,468	58.0%
Conservative	David Gratrick	1,062	42.0%
Turnout			51.5%
Labour hold			

=== Minster ===
Location of Minster ward

Minster
Party	Candidate	Votes	%
Labour	Lawrence Wells	1,733	55.4%
Conservative	J. Frost	1,396	44.6%
Turnout			44.2%
Labour hold			

=== Moorland ===
Location of Moorland ward

Moorland
Party	Candidate	Votes	%
Labour	N. Baldock	1,149	52.4%
Conservative	R. Meads	1,042	47.6%
Turnout			%
Labour hold			

=== Park ===
Location of Park ward

Park
Party	Candidate	Votes	%
Labour	Y. Jackson	1,143	71.5%
Conservative	F. Kay	455	28.5%
Turnout			31.2%
Labour hold			

=== Tritton ===
Location of Tritton ward

Tritton
Party	Candidate	Votes	%
Labour	B. Watson	1,358	68.3%
Conservative	J. Winder	630	31.7%
Turnout			46.6%
Labour hold			
