= 1990 City of Lincoln Council election =

Election held in City of Lincoln Council in 1990

← 1988	3 May 1990	1991 →

11 of the 33 seats to City of Lincoln Council 17 seats needed for a majority
	First party	Second party
Party	Labour	Conservative
Last election	27	6
Seats won	11	0
Seats after	28	5
Seat change	▲1	▼1
Popular vote	20,103	8,625
Percentage	65.5%	28.1%
- Map showing the results of the 1990 Lincoln City Council elections by ward. Red shows Labour seats and blue shows Conservative seats.
Council control before election
Labour
Council control after election
Labour

The 1990 City of Lincoln Council election took place on 3 May 1990. This was on the same day as other local elections. One third of the council was up for election: the seats of which were last contested in 1986. The Labour Party retained control of the council.

== Overall results ==
1990 City of Lincoln Council Election
Party	Seats	Gains	Losses	Net gain/loss	Seats %	Votes %	Votes	+/−
Labour	11	1	0	▲1	100.0	65.5	20,103	▲7.5
Conservative	0	0	1	▼1	0.0	28.1	8,625	▼7.3
Green	0	0	0	Steady	0.0	5.5	1,695	New
Independent Liberal	0	0	0	Steady	0.0	0.4	119	New
SDP	0	0	0	Steady	0.0	0.3	100	New
APT	0	0	0	Steady	0.0	0.2	50	New
Total	11						30,692	

All comparisons in vote share are to the corresponding 1986 election.

== Ward results ==
=== Abbey ===
Location of Abbey ward

Abbey
Party	Candidate	Votes	%
Labour	F. Martin	1,724	75.0%
Conservative	R. Boden	348	15.1%
Green	T. Jones	227	9.9%
Turnout			46.4%
Labour hold			

=== Birchwood ===
Location of Birchwood ward

Birchwood
Party	Candidate	Votes	%
Labour	B. Freeborough	2,430	58.8%
Conservative	J. Newton	1,701	41.2%
Turnout			44.8%
Labour hold			

=== Boultham ===
Location of Boultham ward

Boultham
Party	Candidate	Votes	%
Labour	P. Archer	1,749	71.8%
Conservative	P. Issac	428	17.6%
Green	S. Brown	260	10.7%
Turnout			48.0%
Labour hold			

=== Bracebridge ===
Location of Bracebridge ward

Bracebridge
Party	Candidate	Votes	%
Labour	Bud Robinson	1,874	65.8%
Conservative	R. Meads	976	34.2%
Turnout			48.4%
Labour hold			

=== Carholme ===
Location of Carholme ward

Carholme
Party	Candidate	Votes	%
Labour	L. Vaisey	1,721	62.3%
Conservative	B. Browne	677	24.5%
Green	I. McPherson	366	13.2%
Turnout			52.1%
Labour hold			

=== Castle ===
Location of Castle ward

Castle
Party	Candidate	Votes	%
Labour	H. Bunnage	1,957	70.5%
Conservative	M. Mellows	555	20.0%
Green	D. Kane	264	9.5%
Turnout			52.2%
Labour hold			

=== Longdales ===
Location of Longdales ward

Longdales
Party	Candidate	Votes	%
Labour	N. Haigh	1,686	53.7%
Conservative	N. McDonald	1,173	37.4%
Green	S. McGinty	129	4.1%
SDP	B. Smith	100	3.2%
APT	P. North	50	1.6%
Turnout			62.7%
Labour gain from Conservative			

=== Minster ===
Location of Minster ward

Minster
Party	Candidate	Votes	%
Labour	Richard Metcalfe	2,199	61.3%
Conservative	J. Frost	1,071	29.8%
Green	M. Watkins	319	8.9%
Turnout			50.0%
Labour hold			

=== Moorland ===
Location of Moorland ward

Moorland
Party	Candidate	Votes	%
Labour	Geoffrey Ellis	1,674	64.4%
Conservative	D. Browne	927	35.6%
Turnout			52.7%
Labour hold			

=== Park ===
Location of Park ward

Park
Party	Candidate	Votes	%
Labour	Adelle Ellis	1,404	70.7%
Conservative	M. Kay	333	16.8%
Green	K. Yates	130	6.5%
Independent Liberal	D. Webb	119	6.0%
Turnout			40.5%
Labour hold			

=== Tritton ===
Location of Tritton ward

Tritton
Party	Candidate	Votes	%
Labour	C. Meanwell	1,685	79.4%
Conservative	P. Farrow	436	20.6%
Turnout			51.0%
Labour hold			
