= 1976 City of Lincoln Council election =

Election held in City of Lincoln Council in 1976

| ← 1973 | 6 May 1976 | 1979 → |

All 30 seats to City of Lincoln Council 16 seats needed for a majority
| | First party | Second party |
|---|---|---|
| Party | Democratic Labour | Conservative |
| Last election | 20 | 6 |
| Seats won | 17 | 13 |
| Seat change | ▼3 | ▲7 |
| Popular vote | 10,122 | 8,004 |
| Percentage | 41.0% | 32.4% |
Council control before election
Democratic Labour
Council control after election
Democratic Labour

The 1976 City of Lincoln Council election took place on 6 May 1976. This was on the same day as other local elections. The entire council was up for election and the Democratic Labour Party retained control of the council.

== Overall results ==
1976 City of Lincoln Council Election
| Party | Seats | Gains | Losses | Net gain/loss | Seats % | Votes % | Votes | +/− |
|---|---|---|---|---|---|---|---|---|
| Democratic Labour | 17 | 2 | 5 | ▼3 | 56.7 | 41.0 | 10,122 | ▲1.2 |
| Conservative | 13 | 7 | 0 | ▲7 | 43.3 | 32.4 | 8,004 | ▲4.5 |
| Independent | 0 | 0 | 2 | ▼2 | 0.0 | 0.8 | 204 | ▼3.8 |
| Labour | 0 | 0 | 1 | ▼1 | 0.0 | 24.8 | 6,124 | ▼0.4 |
| Liberal | 0 | 0 | 0 | Steady | 0.0 | 1.0 | 259 | New |
| Ind. Conservative | 0 | 0 | 1 | ▼1 | 0.0 | 1.8 | 442 | ▼0.2 |
| Total | 30 | | | | | | 24,713 | |

== Ward results ==
=== Abbey (3 seats) ===
Abbey (3 seats)
| Party | Candidate | Votes | % |
|---|---|---|---|
| Democratic Labour | N. Marshall | 1,300 | |
| Democratic Labour | K. Carveth | 1,129 | |
| Democratic Labour | E. Coles | 1,046 | |
| Labour | D. Jackson | 641 | |
| Labour | M. McHugh | 634 | |
| Labour | N. Frohock | 550 | |
| Conservative | P. Chambers | 506 | |
| Conservative | P. Marshall | 442 | |
| Liberal | R. Feeney | 259 | |
| Independent | B. Ashmore | 204 | |
| Turnout | | | 48.1 |
| Democratic Labour hold | | | |
| Democratic Labour hold | | | |
| Democratic Labour hold | | | |

=== Boultham (3 seats) ===
Boultham (3 seats)
| Party | Candidate | Votes | % |
|---|---|---|---|
| Democratic Labour | T. Rook | 1,000 | |
| Democratic Labour | A. Padget | 876 | |
| Democratic Labour | D. McLeish | 845 | |
| Conservative | W. Pixsley | 518 | |
| Conservative | F. Hamill | 426 | |
| Labour | J. Ward | 417 | |
| Conservative | C. Ireland | 402 | |
| Labour | D. Bessey | 341 | |
| Labour | P. Deverill | 321 | |
| Turnout | | | 48.9 |
| Democratic Labour hold | | | |
| Democratic Labour gain from Ind. Conservative | | | |
| Democratic Labour gain from Labour | | | |

=== Bracebridge (3 seats) ===
Bracebridge (3 seats)
| Party | Candidate | Votes | % |
|---|---|---|---|
| Conservative | E. Jenkins | 1,090 | |
| Conservative | R. Bracey | 972 | |
| Conservative | P. Roe | 960 | |
| Democratic Labour | D. Colam | 888 | |
| Democratic Labour | R. Brittan | 876 | |
| Democratic Labour | D. Shaw | 763 | |
| Labour | J. Colam | 534 | |
| Labour | D. Colam | 501 | |
| Labour | J. Plant | 449 | |
| Turnout | | | 40.7 |
| Conservative gain from Democratic Labour | | | |
| Conservative gain from Democratic Labour | | | |
| Conservative gain from Democratic Labour | | | |

=== Carholme (3 seats) ===
Carholme (3 seats)
| Party | Candidate | Votes | % |
|---|---|---|---|
| Conservative | N. Spence | 1,010 | |
| Conservative | S. Campbell | 914 | |
| Conservative | I. Campbell | 832 | |
| Democratic Labour | M. Smalec | 694 | |
| Democratic Labour | M. Marshall | 645 | |
| Labour | S. Bishop | 477 | |
| Labour | W. Parker | 457 | |
| Labour | R. Templeman | 434 | |
| Turnout | | | 45.0 |
| Conservative hold | | | |
| Conservative hold | | | |
| Conservative hold | | | |

=== Castle (3 seats) ===
Castle (3 seats)
| Party | Candidate | Votes | % |
|---|---|---|---|
| Conservative | C. Robinson | 1,161 | |
| Conservative | C. North | 979 | |
| Conservative | N. McDonald | 956 | |
| Democratic Labour | F. Goulding | 846 | |
| Democratic Labour | R. Jones | 836 | |
| Labour | T. Dawson | 387 | |
| Labour | H. Bunnage | 356 | |
| Labour | A. Weir | 322 | |
| Turnout | | | 48.8 |
| Conservative gain from Independent | | | |
| Conservative hold | | | |
| Conservative gain from Independent | | | |

=== Ermine (3 seats) ===
Ermine (3 seats)
| Party | Candidate | Votes | % |
|---|---|---|---|
| Democratic Labour | D. Chambers | 1,212 | |
| Democratic Labour | R. Barnes | 1,167 | |
| Democratic Labour | L. Davis | 1,095 | |
| Labour | J. Bennett | 1,043 | |
| Labour | L. Vaisey | 947 | |
| Labour | J. Pulford | 880 | |
| Conservative | E. Fox | 760 | |
| Turnout | | | 42.4 |
| Democratic Labour hold | | | |
| Democratic Labour hold | | | |
| Democratic Labour hold | | | |

=== Hartsholme (3 seats) ===
Hartsholme (3 seats)
| Party | Candidate | Votes | % |
|---|---|---|---|
| Democratic Labour | J. Golding | 1,117 | |
| Democratic Labour | J. Bates | 1,090 | |
| Democratic Labour | M. Richardson | 1,068 | |
| Labour | F. Wright | 821 | |
| Labour | I. Goldson | 773 | |
| Labour | K. Wood | 772 | |
| Conservative | B. Howson | 630 | |
| Communist | J. Ginniff | 49 | |
| Turnout | | | 45.6 |
| Democratic Labour hold | | | |
| Democratic Labour hold | | | |
| Democratic Labour hold | | | |

=== Minster (3 seats) ===
Minster (3 seats)
| Party | Candidate | Votes | % |
|---|---|---|---|
| Conservative | B. Ferguson | 1,333 | |
| Conservative | J. Sullivan | 1,116 | |
| Conservative | F. Horn | 1,062 | |
| Democratic Labour | C. Wilkinson | 831 | |
| Democratic Labour | G. Thornborrow | 674 | |
| Democratic Labour | M. Cole | 669 | |
| Labour | S. Walker | 619 | |
| Labour | L. Wells | 568 | |
| Labour | H. Hubbard | 490 | |
| Turnout | | | 47.1 |
| Democratic Labour hold | | | |
| Conservative gain from Democratic Labour | | | |
| Democratic Labour hold | | | |

=== Moorland (3 seats) ===
Moorland (3 seats)
| Party | Candidate | Votes | % |
|---|---|---|---|
| Democratic Labour | R. Beecham | 1,300 | |
| Democratic Labour | J. Turner | 1,011 | |
| Conservative | B. Abbott | 996 | |
| Conservative | R. Long | 963 | |
| Labour | N. Baldock | 806 | |
| Labour | J. Robertson | 791 | |
| Labour | R. Hodson | 732 | |
| Turnout | | | 41.3 |
| Democratic Labour hold | | | |
| Democratic Labour hold | | | |
| Conservative gain from Democratic Labour | | | |

=== Park (3 seats) ===
Park (3 seats)
| Party | Candidate | Votes | % |
|---|---|---|---|
| Democratic Labour | F. Allen | 934 | |
| Democratic Labour | L. Shepheard | 854 | |
| Democratic Labour | A. Hunt | 678 | |
| Ind. Conservative | R. Bullimore | 442 | |
| Labour | M. Brittan | 379 | |
| Labour | A. Gibbons | 347 | |
| Labour | N. Smith | 304 | |
| Turnout | | | 38.9 |
| Democratic Labour hold | | | |
| Democratic Labour hold | | | |
| Democratic Labour hold | | | |
