= 1987 City of Lincoln Council election =

Election held in City of Lincoln Council in 1987

← 1986	7 May 1987	1988 →

11 of the 33 seats to City of Lincoln Council 17 seats needed for a majority
	First party	Second party
Party	Labour	Conservative
Last election	26	7
Seats won	25	8
Seats after	7	4
Seat change	▼1	▲1
Popular vote	13,557	10,996
Percentage	48.1%	39.0%
- Map showing the results of the 1987 Lincoln City Council elections by ward. Red shows Labour seats and blue shows Conservative seats.
Council control before election
Labour
Council control after election
Labour

The 1987 City of Lincoln Council election took place on 7 May 1987. This was on the same day as other local elections. One third of the council was up for election: the seats of which were last contested in 1983. The Labour Party retained control of the council.

== Overall results ==
1987 City of Lincoln Council Election
Party	Seats	Gains	Losses	Net gain/loss	Seats %	Votes %	Votes	+/−
Labour	7	0	1	▼1	63.6	48.1	13,557	▲1.7
Conservative	4	1	0	▲1	36.4	39.0	10,996	▼0.2
Alliance	0	0	0	Steady	0.0	9.6	2,698	▼3.6
Green	0	0	0	Steady	0.0	1.3	375	▲0.6
Ind. Social Democrat	0	0	0	Steady	0.0	1.4	402	New
Ind. Conservative	0	0	0	Steady	0.0	0.6	156	New
Total	11						28,184	

All comparisons in vote share are to the corresponding 1983 election.

== Ward results ==
=== Abbey ===
Location of Abbey ward

Abbey
Party	Candidate	Votes	%
Labour	Peter West	1,214	54.7%
Conservative	E. Greenfield	539	24.3%
Alliance	R. Jones	402	18.1%
Green	A. Kinneavy	65	2.9%
Turnout			41.9%
Labour hold			

=== Birchwood ===
Location of Birchwood ward

Birchwood
Party	Candidate	Votes	%
Conservative	A. Foulkes	1,458	49.9%
Labour	Lawrence Wells	1,060	36.3%
Ind. Social Democrat	S. Addlesee	402	13.8%
Turnout			37.9%
Conservative gain from Labour			

=== Boultham ===
Location of Boultham ward

Boultham
Party	Candidate	Votes	%
Labour	T. Rook	1,386	58.2%
Conservative	M. Mellows	686	28.8%
Alliance	A. Gowen	311	13.1%
Turnout			%
Labour hold			

=== Bracebridge ===
Location of Bracebridge ward

Bracebridge
Party	Candidate	Votes	%
Conservative	E. Jenkins	1,428	51.7%
Labour	Y. Jackson	1,176	42.6%
Ind. Conservative	P. Roe	156	5.7%
Turnout			46.3%
Conservative hold			

=== Carholme ===
Location of Carholme ward

Carholme
Party	Candidate	Votes	%
Conservative	S. Campbell	1,077	38.2%
Labour	E. Walsh	957	33.9%
Alliance	J. Matthews	689	24.4%
Green	P. Boizot	100	3.5%
Turnout			51.7%
Conservative hold			

=== Castle ===
Location of Castle ward

Castle
Party	Candidate	Votes	%
Labour	Anthony Morgan	1,452	59.3%
Conservative	J. Fawcett	848	34.6%
Alliance	B. Alford	149	6.1%
Turnout			46.6%
Labour hold			

=== Longdales ===
Location of Longdales ward

Longdales
Party	Candidate	Votes	%
Labour	Neil Murray	1,289	47.9%
Conservative	David Gratrick	973	36.1%
Alliance	R. Barnes	431	16.0%
Turnout			54.3%
Labour hold			

=== Minster ===
Location of Minster ward

Minster
Party	Candidate	Votes	%
Labour	Jerome O'Brien	1,777	52.5%
Conservative	J. Sullivan	1,607	47.5%
Turnout			49.6%
Labour gain from Conservative			

=== Moorland ===
Location of Moorland ward

Moorland
Party	Candidate	Votes	%
Conservative	Hilton Spratt	1,327	54.1%
Labour	S. Taggart	1,125	45.9%
Turnout			49.9%
Conservative hold			

=== Park ===
Location of Park ward

Park
Party	Candidate	Votes	%
Labour	David Jackson	1,027	54.8%
Conservative	F. Kay	514	27.4%
Alliance	C. Jarman	271	14.5%
Green	K. Yates	61	3.3%
Turnout			36.4%
Labour hold			

=== Tritton ===
Location of Tritton ward

Tritton
Party	Candidate	Votes	%
Labour	R. Hurst	1,094	49.1%
Alliance	G. Lines	594	26.7%
Conservative	R. Hills	539	24.2%
Turnout			51.5%
Labour hold			
