= 1986 City of Lincoln Council election =

Election held in City of Lincoln Council in 1986

← 1984	8 May 1986	1987 →

11 of the 33 seats to City of Lincoln Council 17 seats needed for a majority
	First party	Second party
Party	Labour	Conservative
Last election	25	8
Seats won	11	1
Seats after	26	7
Seat change	▲1	▼1
Popular vote	13,625	8,311
Percentage	58.0%	35.4%
- Map showing the results of the 1986 Lincoln City Council elections by ward. Red shows Labour seats and blue shows Conservative seats.
Council control before election
Labour
Council control after election
Labour

The 1986 City of Lincoln Council election took place on 8 May 1986. This was on the same day as other local elections. One third of the council was up for election: the seats of which were last contested in 1982. The Labour Party retained control of the council.

== Overall results ==
1986 City of Lincoln Council Election
Party	Seats	Gains	Losses	Net gain/loss	Seats %	Votes %	Votes	+/−
Labour	11	1	0	▲1	91.7	58.0	13,625	
Conservative	1	0	1	▼1	8.3	35.4	8,311	
Alliance	0	0	0	Steady	0.0	5.0	1,169	
Green	0	0	0	Steady	0.0	1.6	378	
Total	12						23,483	

All comparisons in vote share are to the corresponding 1982 election.

== Ward results ==
=== Abbey ===
Location of Abbey ward

Abbey
Party	Candidate	Votes	%
Labour	A. Gibbons	1,549	75.3%
Conservative	H. Nicholson	509	24.7%
Turnout			38.3%
Labour hold			

=== Birchwood ===
Location of Birchwood ward

Birchwood
Party	Candidate	Votes	%
Labour	B. Freeborough	1,245	54.7%
Conservative	J. Calland	1,032	45.3%
Turnout			33.2%
Labour hold			

=== Boultham ===
Location of Boultham ward

Boultham
Party	Candidate	Votes	%
Labour	P. Archer	1,307	64.7%
Conservative	M. Mellows	713	35.3%
Turnout			39.7%
Labour hold			

=== Bracebridge ===
Location of Bracebridge ward

Bracebridge
Party	Candidate	Votes	%
Labour	Bud Robinson	1,169	51.7%
Conservative	R. Bracey	1,090	48.3%
Turnout			37.7%
Labour gain from Conservative			

=== Carholme ===
Location of Carholme ward

Carholme
Party	Candidate	Votes	%
Labour	L. Vaisey	834	40.8%
Conservative	J. Fawcett	626	30.6%
Alliance	K. Harrison	474	23.2%
Green	P. Boizot	111	5.4%
Turnout			37.6%
Labour gain from Conservative			

=== Castle (2 seats) ===
Location of Castle ward

Castle (2 seats)
Party	Candidate	Votes	%
Labour	H. Bunnage	1,402	
Labour	Loraine Woolley	1,310	
Conservative	P. Adams	650	
Conservative	J. Fawcett	632	
Green	B. Alford	157	
Turnout			40.9%
Labour hold			
Labour hold			

=== Longdales ===
Location of Longdales ward

Longdales
Party	Candidate	Votes	%
Conservative	N. McDonald	1,150	44.2%
Labour	B. Watson	1,143	43.9%
Alliance	B. Smith	311	11.9%
Turnout			52.4%
Conservative hold			

=== Minster ===
Location of Minster ward

Minster
Party	Candidate	Votes	%
Labour	Richard Metcalfe	1,720	61.7%
Conservative	F. Horn	1,069	38.3%
Turnout			43.0%
Labour hold			

=== Moorland ===
Location of Moorland ward

Moorland
Party	Candidate	Votes	%
Labour	Geoffrey Ellis	1,173	64.0%
Conservative	M. Campbell	661	36.0%
Turnout			37.3%
Labour hold			

=== Park ===
Location of Park ward

Park
Party	Candidate	Votes	%
Labour	R. Drinkall	1,035	66.5%
Conservative	J. Howitt	411	26.4%
Green	K. Yates	110	7.1%
Turnout			31.3%
Labour hold			

=== Tritton ===
Location of Tritton ward

Tritton
Party	Candidate	Votes	%
Labour	C. Meanwell	1,048	57.2%
Conservative	R. Hills	400	21.8%
Alliance	G. Lines	384	21.0%
Turnout			42.1%
Labour hold			
