= Democratic Labour Party (UK, 1972) =

Defunct social democratic political party in the United Kingdom

- Leader: Dick Taverne
- Founded: 1972
- Split from: Labour Party
- Merged into: Social Democratic Alliance
- Ideology: Social democracy

The Democratic Labour Party, sometimes referred to as the Lincoln Democratic Labour Association, was a minor political party operating in the United Kingdom in the 1970s. It was formed by the Labour MP Dick Taverne when his Constituency Labour Party (CLP) in the Lincoln constituency deselected him as its candidate at the next general election. He had fallen out with it over Britain's proposed membership of the European Communities, which he supported but it did not.

== History ==
=== Establishment and 1973 by-election ===
Dick Taverne had been first elected to Lincoln in the 1962 by-election as a Labour MP. A moderate in the party, Taverne had been part of the Campaign for Democratic Socialism. In 1971, despite the wishes of his increasingly left-wing dominated Constituency Labour Party (CLP), Taverne had voted with the Conservative government to join the European Economic Community (EEC). Due to this, Taverne's CLP voted to deselect him as their MP in 1972, and this was upheld by Labour's National Executive Committee after an appeal. Taverne decided to resign from Labour on 6 October 1972, and formed the Lincoln Democratic Labour Association, which his supporters in the CLP joined. His initial intention was to eventually rejoin the Labour Party, but some others attempted to persuade him to try to establish a new party of the political centre. Taverne admitted that he would have rather stood as a "Social Democrat" candidate, but the term was not familiar to the public at large at the time.

Taverne resigned from parliament at the same time that he resigned from the Labour Party in order to force the issue into the open and establish a credible third party between Labour and the Conservatives. He won the ensuing Lincoln by-election, held in March 1973. Taverne ran on a platform of support for the EEC, industrial democracy and price and incomes policy, as well as arguing that MPs should be representatives of their constituencies rather than beholden to a party line.

His victory was aided by the controversial adoption of Jonathan Guinness by the Conservatives, and by the lack of a Liberal Party candidate, for the Liberal Party decided to support Taverne's candidacy. Taverne was also covertly aided by some figures on the moderate flank of the Labour party, though most prominent moderates, including those who would later go on to form the Social Democratic Party (SDP), thought he was going too far. Taverne did try to convince Roy Jenkins to join him in defecting, but was unsuccessful; Jenkins believed he could bring around a dozen Labour MPs with him, but did not think the time was right. However, in 1979, Jenkins said not supporting Taverne in 1973 was a 'big mistake'.

=== 1974 and 1979 general elections ===
Shortly after his by-election victory, Taverne formed the Campaign for Social Democracy as a national body. He was re-elected in the February 1974 general election, and continued to serve until the October 1974 general election when he was defeated, Harold Wilson having demanded the Labour Party "throw the kitchen sink" at Lincoln in its efforts to displace him. Taverne did not stand in the seat again, but Democratic Labour continued to organise politically, to the extent that Democratic Labour controlled Lincoln City Council from 1973 until 1979 and across England during the 1973 local elections Democratic Labour candidates achieved some success.

At the 1979 general election, Democratic Labour contested two constituencies: Lincoln, and Brigg and Scunthorpe. Taverne advised against nominating any candidates, but campaigned for them anyway. Both were unsuccessful in their attempts to gain seats in the House of Commons, losing their deposits (at that time 12.5% of the vote was required in order to retain deposits; this was reduced to 5% after the 1983 general election). However, both seats were narrowly gained from the incumbent Labour MPs by the Conservative Party's candidates, with the Conservative majority over Labour being less than the Democratic Labour vote. In an analysis of the voting in the election, Ivor Crewe, Director of the British Election Study, stated that the Democratic Labour candidates "splintered enough of the Labour vote ... to allow the Conservatives to gain both seats".

=== Lincoln local elections ===
In the 1973 City of Lincoln council election, Democratic Labour got 20 seats, a majority. The party held power until the 1979 election, and it lost its last councillor in 1980.

=== Merger and legacy ===
In 1980, Democratic Labour merged with the Social Democratic Alliance. A social club that the groups had established ran until 1987.

Prior to his defection to the Conservatives in 1977, Reg Prentice considered standing as a social democrat and stood on a platform with Taverne calling for a new party.

In many ways, Democratic Labour can be seen as a forerunner of the SDP, which broke away from Labour in the early 1980s, putting forward many of the same viewpoints as Taverne. He twice stood as a SDP candidate but failed to be elected. "Democratic Labour" had even been considered as a potential name for what would be the SDP.

== Election results ==
=== General elections ===
Election	Constituency	Candidate	Votes	Percentage	Position
1973 by-election	Lincoln	Dick Taverne	21,967	58.2	1
1974 Feb general election	Lincoln	Dick Taverne	14,780	35.6	1
1974 Oct general election	Lincoln	Dick Taverne	13,714	34.6	2
1979 general election	Brigg and Scunthorpe	Cyril Nottingham	2,042	2.9	4
1979 general election	Lincoln	Freddie Stockdale	1,743	4.1	4

=== Local elections ===
Election	Votes	%	Seats	+/−
1973 Lincoln	8,660	39.8 (#1)	20 / 30	New
1976 Lincoln	10,122	41.0 (#1)	17 / 30	▼3
1979 Lincoln (Note: The total seats on the council was increased from 30 to 33.)	7,462	18.3 (#3)	3 / 33	▼14
1980 Lincoln (Note: Only 11 out of the 33 seats were up for election.)	1,842	8.0 (#3)	0 / 33	▼3

== See also ==
- List of Labour Party breakaway parties (UK)
