= 1983 City of Lincoln Council election =

Election held in City of Lincoln Council in 1983

- 5 May 1983

11 of the 33 seats to City of Lincoln Council 17 seats needed for a majority
| | First party | Second party |
|---|---|---|
| Party | Labour | Conservative |
| Last election | 20 | 13 |
| Seats won | 8 | 3 |
| Seats after | 23 | 10 |
| Seat change | ▲3 | ▼3 |
| Popular vote | 12,532 | 10,575 |
| Percentage | 46.4% | 39.2% |
- Map showing the results of the 1983 Lincoln City Council elections by ward. Red shows Labour seats and blue shows the Conservatives seats.
Council control before election
Labour
Council control after election
Labour

The 1983 City of Lincoln Council election took place on 5 May 1983. This was on the same day as other local elections. One third of the council was up for election: the seats of the top-polling candidates at the all out election of 1979. The Labour Party retained control of the council.

== Overall results ==
1983 City of Lincoln Council Election
| Party | Seats | Gains | Losses | Net gain/loss | Seats % | Votes % | Votes | +/− |
|---|---|---|---|---|---|---|---|---|
| Labour | 8 | 3 | 0 | ▲3 | 72.7 | 46.4 | 12,532 | |
| Conservative | 3 | 0 | 3 | ▼3 | 27.3 | 39.2 | 10,575 | |
| Alliance | 0 | 0 | 0 | Steady | 0.0 | 13.2 | 3,561 | |
| Ecology | 0 | 0 | 0 | Steady | 0.0 | 0.7 | 181 | |
| Independent Labour | 0 | 0 | 0 | Steady | 0.0 | 0.4 | 118 | |
| Rev Reform | 0 | 0 | 0 | Steady | 0.0 | 0.0 | 17 | |
| Total | 11 | | | | | | 26,984 | |

== Ward results ==
=== Abbey ===
Location of Abbey ward

Abbey
| Party | Candidate | Votes | % |
|---|---|---|---|
| Labour | Peter West | 1,150 | 51.2% |
| Conservative | J. Frost | 722 | 32.2% |
| Alliance | M. Sedgwick | 372 | 16.6% |
| Turnout | | | 41.5% |
| Labour hold | | | |

=== Birchwood ===
Location of Birchwood ward

Birchwood
| Party | Candidate | Votes | % |
|---|---|---|---|
| Labour | Lawrence Wells | 910 | 40.9% |
| Conservative | W. Crumblehulme | 864 | 38.8% |
| Labour | L. Retallack | 418 | 18.8% |
| Independent Labour | K. Erskine | 34 | 1.5% |
| Turnout | | | 40.2% |
| Labour gain from Conservative | | | |

=== Boultham ===
Location of Boultham ward

Boultham
| Party | Candidate | Votes | % |
|---|---|---|---|
| Labour | T. Rook | 1,305 | 52.1% |
| Conservative | P. Samways | 870 | 34.7% |
| Alliance | L. Davis | 264 | 10.5% |
| Ecology | C. Moulton | 65 | 2.6% |
| Turnout | | | 51.3% |
| Labour hold | | | |

Note: T. Rook had been elected as a Democratic Labour councillor in 1979

=== Bracebridge ===
Location of Bracebridge ward

Bracebridge
| Party | Candidate | Votes | % |
|---|---|---|---|
| Conservative | E. Jenkins | 1,603 | 61.3% |
| Labour | W. Fielder | 1,011 | 38.7% |
| Turnout | | | 45.4% |
| Conservative hold | | | |

=== Carholme ===
Location of Carholme ward

Carholme
| Party | Candidate | Votes | % |
|---|---|---|---|
| Conservative | S. Campbell | 1,185 | 43.3% |
| Labour | B. Phippard | 799 | 29.2% |
| Alliance | S. England | 684 | 25.0% |
| Ecology | S. Moulton | 69 | 2.5% |
| Turnout | | | 49.5% |
| Conservative hold | | | |

=== Castle ===
Location of Castle ward

Castle
| Party | Candidate | Votes | % |
|---|---|---|---|
| Labour | Anthony Morgan | 1,419 | 55.8% |
| Conservative | M. Mellows | 766 | 30.1% |
| Alliance | E. Thompson | 356 | 14.0% |
| Turnout | | | 49.1% |
| Labour hold | | | |

=== Longdales ===
Location of Longdales ward

Longdales
| Party | Candidate | Votes | % |
|---|---|---|---|
| Labour | Neil Murray | 1,160 | 46.0% |
| Conservative | C. North | 979 | 38.8% |
| Alliance | R. Barnes | 356 | 14.1% |
| Independent Labour | M. King | 27 | 1.1% |
| Turnout | | | 51.4% |
| Labour gain from Conservative | | | |

=== Minster ===
Location of Minster ward

Minster
| Party | Candidate | Votes | % |
|---|---|---|---|
| Labour | Jerome O'Brien | 1,481 | 44.8% |
| Conservative | J. Sullivan | 1,352 | 40.9% |
| Alliance | C. Davis | 415 | 12.6% |
| Independent Labour | N. Erskin | 57 | 1.7% |
| Turnout | | | 53.9% |
| Labour gain from Conservative | | | |

=== Moorland ===
Location of Moorland ward

Moorland
| Party | Candidate | Votes | % |
|---|---|---|---|
| Conservative | B. Abbott | 1,051 | 46.5% |
| Labour | R. Hodson | 949 | 42.0% |
| Alliance | C. Robins | 243 | 10.8% |
| Rev Reform | T. Kyle | 17 | 0.8% |
| Turnout | | | 45.7% |
| Conservative hold | | | |

=== Park ===
Location of Park ward

Park
| Party | Candidate | Votes | % |
|---|---|---|---|
| Labour | David Jackson | 1,004 | 48.1% |
| Conservative | K. Pullen | 582 | 27.9% |
| Alliance | F. Allen | 453 | 21.7% |
| Ecology | G. Bosworth | 47 | 2.3% |
| Turnout | | | 41.9% |
| Labour hold | | | |

=== Tritton ===
Location of Tritton ward

Tritton
| Party | Candidate | Votes | % |
|---|---|---|---|
| Labour | Roland Hurst | 1,344 | 69.1% |
| Conservative | R. Seale | 601 | 30.9% |
| Turnout | | | 44.8% |
| Labour hold | | | |
