= 1980 City of Lincoln Council election =

Election held in City of Lincoln Council in 1980

← 1979	1 May 1980	1982 →

11 of the 33 seats to City of Lincoln Council 17 seats needed for a majority
	First party	Second party	Third party
Party	Conservative	Labour	Democratic Labour
Last election	21	9	3
Seats before	21	10	2
Seats won	4	7	0
Seats after	17	16	0
Seat change	▼4	▲6	▼2
Popular vote	8,758	9,986	1,842
Percentage	37.9%	43.3%	8.0%
- Map showing the results of the 1980 Lincoln City Council elections by ward. Red shows Labour seats and blue shows the Conservatives seats.
Council control before election
Conservative
Council control after election
Conservative

The 1980 City of Lincoln Council election took place on 1 May 1980. This was on the same day as other local elections. One third of the council was up for election: the seats of the candidates who polled third at the all out election of 1979. The Conservative Party retained control of the council.

== Overall results ==
1980 City of Lincoln Council Election
Party	Seats	Gains	Losses	Net gain/loss	Seats %	Votes %	Votes	+/−
Labour	4	6	0	▲6	63.6	43.3	9,986	
Conservative	7	0	4	▼4	36.4	37.9	8,758	
Democratic Labour	0	0	2	▼2	0.0	8.0	1,842	
Liberal	0	0	0	Steady	0.0	10.4	2,399	
Ecology	0	0	0	Steady	0.0	0.4	96	
Total	11						23,081	

== Ward results ==
=== Abbey ===
Location of Abbey ward

Abbey
Party	Candidate	Votes	%
Labour	J. Robertson	1,066	50.8%
Conservative	J. Frost	567	27.0%
Democratic Labour	C. Sanderson	235	11.2%
Liberal	Feeney	232	11.0%
Turnout			40.1%
Labour gain from Democratic Labour			

=== Birchwood ===
Location of Birchwood ward

Boultham
Party	Candidate	Votes	%
Labour	Wright	823	45.4%
Conservative	Colam	567	31.3%
Liberal	Templeman	424	23.4%
Turnout			46.7%
Labour gain from Conservative			

=== Boultham ===
Location of Boultham ward

Boultham
Party	Candidate	Votes	%
Labour	Ralph Toofany	877	41.6%
Conservative	B. Stanton	698	33.1%
Democratic Labour	H. Buttery	293	13.9%
Liberal	Raisen	187	8.9%
Ecology	C. Moulton	52	2.5%
Turnout			42.9%
Labour gain from Conservative			

=== Bracebridge ===
Location of Bracebridge ward

Bracebridge
Party	Candidate	Votes	%
Conservative	P. Roe	988	46.1%
Labour	S. Close	876	40.9%
Liberal	J. Gill	280	13.1%
Turnout			40.5%
Conservative hold			

=== Carholme ===
Location of Carholme ward

Carholme
Party	Candidate	Votes	%
Conservative	C. Ireland	1,180	51.2%
Democratic Labour	L. Wells	801	34.8%
Labour	D. Smith	323	14.0%
Turnout			42.1%
Conservative hold			

=== Castle ===
Location of Castle ward

Castle
Party	Candidate	Votes	%
Conservative	D. Chambers	1,060	43.4%
Labour	Townrow	994	40.7%
Liberal	F. Goulding	272	11.1%
Democratic Labour	Barnes	118	4.8%
Turnout			48.2%
Conservative hold			

=== Longdales ===
Location of Longdales ward

Longdales
Party	Candidate	Votes	%
Labour	D. Miller	934	44.1%
Conservative	R. Long	856	40.4%
Liberal	Turver	216	10.2%
Democratic Labour	L. Davis	113	5.3%
Turnout			42.2%
Labour gain from Conservative			

=== Minster ===
Location of Minster ward

Minster
Party	Candidate	Votes	%
Conservative	F. Horn	1,220	46.9%
Labour	J. Ward	1,078	41.4%
Liberal	Hoyes	304	11.7%
Turnout			44.1%
Conservative hold			

=== Moorland ===
Location of Moorland ward

Moorland
Party	Candidate	Votes	%
Labour	N. Baldock	921	50.7%
Conservative	A. Parker	897	49.3%
Turnout			37.7%
Labour gain from Conservative			

=== Park ===
Location of Park ward

Park
Party	Candidate	Votes	%
Labour	J. Plant	577	30.1%
Liberal	P. Taylor	484	25.2%
Democratic Labour	F. Allen	422	22.0%
Conservative	J. Kay	393	20.5%
Ecology	Camidge	44	2.3%
Turnout			39.4%
Labour gain from Democratic Labour			

=== Tritton ===
Location of Tritton ward

Tritton
Party	Candidate	Votes	%
Labour	H. Hubbard	1,039	60.8%
Democratic Labour	Phillips	338	19.8%
Conservative	Burgess	332	19.4%
Turnout			39.3%
Labour hold			
