= 2003 City of Lincoln Council election =

2003 UK local government election

← 2002	1 May 2003	2004 →

11 of the 33 seats to City of Lincoln Council 17 seats needed for a majority
	First party	Second party
Party	Labour	Conservative
Last election	27	6
Seats won	11	0
Seats after	27	6
Seat change	Steady	Steady
Popular vote	14,382	10,005
Percentage	51.5%	35.8%
- Map showing the results of the 2003 Lincoln City Council elections by ward. Red shows Labour seats and blue shows Conservative seats.
Council control before election
Labour
Council control after election
Labour

Elections to City of Lincoln Council in Lincolnshire, England, were held on 1 May 2003. One third of the Council was up for election and the Labour Party stayed in overall control of the council.

A trial took place for all postal voting leading to turnout increasing from 26% in 2002 to 47% in this election.

After the election, the composition of the council was:

- Labour 27
- Conservative 6

== Election result ==
Lincoln local election result 2003
Party	Seats	Gains	Losses	Net gain/loss	Seats %	Votes %	Votes	+/−
Labour	11	0	0	Steady	100	51.5	14,382	▲5.1
Conservative	0	0	0	Steady	0	35.8	10,005	▼2.3
Lincoln Independent Alliance	0	0	0	Steady	0	5.2	1,455	▼4.7
Liberal Democrats	0	0	0	Steady	0	2.9	812	▼1.5
Green	0	0	0	Steady	0	2.4	657	▲1.2
Independent	0	0	0	Steady	0	2.2	613	▲2.2

== Ward results ==
=== Abbey ===
Location of Abbey ward

Abbey
Party	Candidate	Votes	%
Labour	Kathleen Brothwell	1,011	50.4
Conservative	David Bellamy	641	32.0
Liberal Democrats	Charles Shaw	353	17.6
Majority		370	18.4
Turnout		2,005	46.2%
Labour hold			

=== Birchwood ===
Location of Birchwood ward

Birchwood
Party	Candidate	Votes	%
Labour	Stephen Allnutt	1,100	45.2
Conservative	Frank Martin	801	32.9
Lincoln Independent Alliance	Richard Hall	532	21.9
Majority		299	12.3
Turnout		2,433	46.3%
Labour hold			

=== Boultham ===
Location of Boultham ward

Boultham
Party	Candidate	Votes	%
Labour	Richard Coupland	1,346	53.6
Independent	Malcolm Skeels	613	24.4
Conservative	John Woolf	550	21.9
Majority		733	29.2
Turnout		2,509	46.8%
Labour hold			

=== Bracebridge ===
Location of Bracebridge ward

Bracebridge
Party	Candidate	Votes	%
Labour	Bud Robinson	1,628	52.5
Conservative	Paul Grice	1,473	47.5
Majority		155	5.0
Turnout		3,101	50.8%
Labour hold			

=== Carholme ===
Location of Carholme ward

Carholme
Party	Candidate	Votes	%
Labour	Karen Lee	970	42.0
Conservative	Ann Duguid	584	25.3
Liberal Democrats	Phillip Mappin	459	19.9
Green	Nicola Watson	299	12.9
Majority		386	16.7
Turnout		2,312	45.5%
Labour hold			

=== Castle ===
Location of Castle ward

Castle
Party	Candidate	Votes	%
Labour	Anthony Morgan	1,470	66.2
Conservative	Michael Reeve	749	33.8
Majority		721	32.4
Turnout		2,219	47.7%
Labour hold			

=== Glebe ===
Location of Glebe ward

Glebe
Party	Candidate	Votes	%
Labour	Richard Metcalfe	1,254	44.0
Lincoln Independent Alliance	George Spencer	923	32.4
Conservative	Marion Mellows	670	23.5
Majority		331	11.6
Turnout		2,847	48.8%
Labour hold			

=== Hartsholme ===
Location of Hartsholme ward

Hartsholme
Party	Candidate	Votes	%
Labour	Christopher Grimshaw	1,563	51.4
Conservative	Philip Hubbard	1,477	48.6
Majority		86	2.8
Turnout		3,070	46.7%
Labour hold			

=== Minster ===
Location of Minster ward

Minster
Party	Candidate	Votes	%
Labour	Morris Cookson	1,336	50.4
Conservative	Anthony Calvert	1,313	49.6
Majority		23	0.8
Turnout		2,649	51.6%
Labour hold			

=== Moorland ===
Location of Moorland ward

Moorland
Party	Candidate	Votes	%
Labour	Geoffrey Ellis	1,638	58.6
Conservative	Duncan Fraser	1,157	41.4
Majority		481	17.2
Turnout		2,795	51.0%
Labour hold			

=== Park ===
Location of Park ward

Park
Party	Candidate	Votes	%
Labour	David Jackson	1,066	52.9
Conservative	Barry Briggs	590	29.3
Green	Kenneth Yates	358	17.8
Majority		576	23.6
Turnout		2,014	39.1%
Labour hold			
