= 1992 City of Lincoln Council election =

Election held in City of Lincoln Council in 1992

← 1991	7 May 1992	1994 →

11 of the 33 seats to City of Lincoln Council 17 seats needed for a majority
	First party	Second party
Party	Labour	Conservative
Last election	31	2
Seats won	9	2
Seats after	30	3
Seat change	▼1	▲1
Popular vote	12,242	10,066
Percentage	51.6%	42.4%
- Map showing the results of the 1992 Lincoln City Council elections by ward. Red shows Labour seats and blue shows Conservative seats.
Council control before election
Labour
Council control after election
Labour

The 1992 City of Lincoln Council election took place on 7 May 1992. This was on the same day as other local elections. One third of the council was up for election: the seats of which were last contested in 1988. The Labour Party retained control of the council.

== Overall results ==
1992 City of Lincoln Council Election
Party	Seats	Gains	Losses	Net gain/loss	Seats %	Votes %	Votes	+/−
Labour	9	0	1	▼1	81.8	51.6	12,242	▼8.6
Conservative	2	1	0	▲1	18.2	42.4	10,066	▲2.9
Liberal Democrats	0	0	0	0	0.0	2.8	653	New
Green	0	0	0	0	0.0	2.5	602	New
Liberal	0	0	0	0	0.0	0.6	150	New
Total	11						23,713	

All comparisons in vote share are to the corresponding 1988 election.

== Ward results ==
=== Abbey ===
Location of Abbey ward

Abbey
Party	Candidate	Votes	%
Labour	J. Robertson	1,119	69.2%
Conservative	J. McKernan	497	30.8%
Turnout			31.6%
Labour hold			

=== Birchwood ===
Location of Birchwood ward

Birchwood
Party	Candidate	Votes	%
Conservative	W. Crumblehulme	2,001	57.6%
Labour	G. Pepper	1,165	33.5%
Liberal Democrats	G. Scarisbrick	309	8.9%
Turnout			35.5%
Conservative hold			

=== Boultham ===
Location of Boultham ward

Boultham
Party	Candidate	Votes	%
Labour	Ralph Toofany	1,022	56.8%
Conservative	P. Daly	551	30.6%
Liberal Democrats	D. Paton	132	7.3%
Green	P. North	95	5.3%
Turnout			34.6%
Labour hold			

=== Bracebridge ===
Location of Bracebridge ward

Bracebridge
Party	Candidate	Votes	%
Labour	A. Bradley	1,079	46.1%
Conservative	R. Meads	1,048	44.8%
Liberal Democrats	N. Sandall	212	9.1%
Turnout			39.4%
Labour hold			

=== Carholme ===
Location of Carholme ward

Carholme
Party	Candidate	Votes	%
Labour	S. Paterson	1,261	52.7%
Conservative	M. Mellows	900	37.6%
Green	D. Kane	233	9.7%
Turnout			44.8%
Labour hold			

=== Castle ===
Location of Castle ward

Castle
Party	Candidate	Votes	%
Labour	Loraine Woolley	1,140	55.8%
Conservative	T. McKernan	735	36.0%
Green	S. Brown	168	8.2%
Turnout			36.7%
Labour hold			

=== Longdales ===
Location of Longdales ward

Longdales
Party	Candidate	Votes	%
Labour	D. Miller	1,207	56.9%
Conservative	Sandra Gratrick	913	43.1%
Turnout			42.6%
Labour hold			

=== Minster ===
Location of Minster ward

Minster
Party	Candidate	Votes	%
Labour	Lawrence Wells	1,415	49.8%
Conservative	David Gratrick	1,279	45.0%
Liberal	D. Webb	150	5.3%
Turnout			38.1%
Labour hold			

=== Moorland ===
Location of Moorland ward

Moorland
Party	Candidate	Votes	%
Conservative	D. Browne	1,151	53.4%
Labour	N. Baldock	1,006	46.6%
Turnout			43.0%
Conservative gain from Labour			

=== Park ===
Location of Park ward

Park
Party	Candidate	Votes	%
Labour	Y. Jackson	787	56.9%
Conservative	J. Winder	489	35.4%
Green	K. Yates	106	7.7%
Turnout			27.3%
Labour hold			

=== Tritton ===
Location of Tritton ward

Tritton
Party	Candidate	Votes	%
Labour	Richard Coupland	1,041	67.5%
Conservative	P. Farrow	502	32.5%
Turnout			36.7%
Labour hold			
