= 1991 City of Lincoln Council election =

Election held in City of Lincoln Council in 1991

← 1990	2 May 1991	1992 →

11 of the 33 seats to City of Lincoln Council 17 seats needed for a majority
	First party	Second party
Party	Labour	Conservative
Last election	28	5
Seats won	10	1
Seats after	31	2
Seat change	▲3	▼3
Popular vote	16,710	9,864
Percentage	59.7%	35.3%
- Map showing the results of the 1991 Lincoln City Council elections by ward. Red shows Labour seats and blue shows Conservative seats.
Council control before election
Labour
Council control after election
Labour

The 1991 City of Lincoln Council election took place on 2 May 1991. This was on the same day as other local elections. One third of the council was up for election: the seats of which were last contested in 1987. The Labour Party retained control of the council.

== Overall results ==
1991 City of Lincoln Council Election
Party	Seats	Gains	Losses	Net gain/loss	Seats %	Votes %	Votes	+/−
Labour	10	3	0	▲3	90.9	59.7	16,710	▲10.6
Conservative	1	0	3	▼3	9.1	35.3	9,864	▼3.7
Green	0	0	0	Steady	0.0	4.4	1,218	▲3.1
Independent Liberal	0	0	0	Steady	0.0	0.7	186	New
Total	11						27,978	

All comparisons in vote share are to the corresponding 1987 election.

== Ward results ==
=== Abbey ===
Location of Abbey ward

Abbey
Party	Candidate	Votes	%
Labour	Peter West	1,467	76.5%
Conservative	Meads R.	451	23.5%
Turnout			39.4%
Labour hold			

=== Birchwood ===
Location of Birchwood ward

Birchwood
Party	Candidate	Votes	%
Conservative	Edmund Strengiel	1,941	49.7%
Labour	D. Martin	1,705	43.7%
Green	P. North	259	6.6%
Turnout			41.9%
Conservative hold			

=== Boultham ===
Location of Boultham ward

Boultham
Party	Candidate	Votes	%
Labour	T. Rook	1,612	71.2%
Conservative	P. Isaac	493	21.8%
Green	S. Brown	160	7.1%
Turnout			44.6%
Labour hold			

=== Bracebridge ===
Location of Bracebridge ward

Bracebridge
Party	Candidate	Votes	%
Labour	R. Hall	1,542	55.6%
Conservative	E. Jenkins	1,233	44.4%
Turnout			47.5%
Labour gain from Conservative			

=== Carholme ===
Location of Carholme ward

Carholme
Party	Candidate	Votes	%
Labour	L. Richardson	1,414	54.5%
Conservative	M. Mellows	884	34.1%
Green	I. McPherson	297	11.4%
Turnout			50.7%
Labour gain from Conservative			

=== Castle ===
Location of Castle ward

Castle
Party	Candidate	Votes	%
Labour	Anthony Morgan	1,563	64.6%
Conservative	I. Adams	643	26.6%
Green	D. Kane	213	8.8%
Turnout			44.7%
Labour hold			

=== Longdales ===
Location of Longdales ward

Longdales
Party	Candidate	Votes	%
Labour	Neil Murray	1,614	63.7%
Conservative	Sandra Gratrick	920	36.3%
Turnout			51.2%
Labour hold			

=== Minster ===
Location of Minster ward

Minster
Party	Candidate	Votes	%
Labour	Jerome O'Brien	1,785	54.2%
Conservative	David Gratrick	1,157	35.1%
Independent Liberal	D. Webb	186	5.6%
Green	P. Watkins	167	5.1%
Turnout			45.5%
Labour hold			

=== Moorland ===
Location of Moorland ward

Moorland
Party	Candidate	Votes	%
Labour	E. Noble	1,342	51.9%
Conservative	Hilton Spratt	1,245	48.1%
Turnout			52.2%
Labour gain from Conservative			

=== Park ===
Location of Park ward

Park
Party	Candidate	Votes	%
Labour	David Jackson	1,188	68.6%
Conservative	F. Kay	423	24.4%
Green	K. Yates	122	7.0%
Turnout			36.2%
Labour hold			

=== Tritton ===
Location of Tritton ward

Tritton
Party	Candidate	Votes	%
Labour	R. Hurst	1,478	75.7%
Conservative	P. Farrow	474	24.3%
Turnout			47.1%
Labour hold			
