= 2000 City of Lincoln Council election =

← 1999	3 May 2000	2002 →

11 of the 33 seats to City of Lincoln Council 17 seats needed for a majority
	First party	Second party
Party	Labour	Conservative
Last election	31	2
Seats won	7	4
Seats after	29	4
Seat change	▼2	▲2
Popular vote	7,095	5,725
Percentage	46.7%	37.6%
- Map showing the results of the 2000 Lincoln City Council elections by ward. Red shows Labour seats and blue shows Conservative seats.
Council control before election
Labour
Council control after election
Labour

Elections to City of Lincoln Council in Lincolnshire, England, were held on 4 May 2000. One third of the council was up for election and the Labour Party stayed in overall control of the council.

After the election, the composition of the council was:

- Labour 29
- Conservative 4

== Election results ==
Lincoln local election result 2000
Party	Seats	Gains	Losses	Net gain/loss	Seats %	Votes %	Votes	+/−
Labour	7	0	2	▼2	63.6	46.7	7,095	
Conservative	4	2	0	▲2	36.4	37.6	5,725	
Lincoln Independent Alliance	0	0	0	Steady	0.0	10.0	1,522	
Liberal Democrats	0	0	0	Steady	0.0	4.5	681	
Green	0	0	0	Steady	0.0	1.2	184	

== Ward results ==
=== Abbey ===
Location of Abbey ward

Abbey
Party	Candidate	Votes	%
Labour	Fay Smith	663	64.4%
Conservative	J. Gainey	366	35.6%
Turnout			20.4%
Labour hold			

=== Birchwood ===
Location of Birchwood ward

Birchwood
Party	Candidate	Votes	%
Conservative	Edmund Strengiel	672	50.9%
Labour	P. Gowen	560	42.5%
Lincoln Independent Alliance	R. Wells	87	6.6%
Turnout			24.3%
Conservative hold			

=== Boultham ===
Location of Boultham ward

Boultham
Party	Candidate	Votes	%
Labour	Ralph Toofany	749	52.1%
Conservative	D. Grice	327	22.7%
Lincoln Independent Alliance	M. Skeels	240	16.7%
Liberal Democrats	D. Paton	122	8.5%
Turnout			25.2%
Labour hold			

=== Bracebridge ===
Location of Bracebridge ward

Bracebridge
Party	Candidate	Votes	%
Conservative	Hilton Spratt	812	47.2%
Labour	A. Taylor	688	40.0%
Liberal Democrats	D. Simpson	192	11.2%
Lincoln Independent Alliance	A. Fletcher	27	1.6%
Turnout			27.8%
Conservative gain from Labour			

=== Carholme ===
Location of Carholme ward

Carholme
Party	Candidate	Votes	%
Labour	Neil Murray	695	45.4%
Conservative	S. Grice	364	23.8%
Liberal Democrats	L. Gabriel	239	15.6%
Green	N. Watson	147	9.6%
Lincoln Independent Alliance	J. Spencer	87	5.7%
Turnout			28.8%
Labour hold			

=== Castle ===
Location of Castle ward

Castle
Party	Candidate	Votes	%
Labour	Donald Nannestad	714	57.8%
Conservative	B. Hollands	442	35.8%
Lincoln Independent Alliance	L. Openshaw	80	6.5%
Turnout			23.9%
Labour hold			

=== Glebe ===
Location of Glebe ward

Glebe
Party	Candidate	Votes	%
Labour	Lawrence Wells	692	49.7%
Conservative	P. Mappin	408	29.3%
Lincoln Independent Alliance	G. Spencer	292	21.0%
Turnout			23.7%
Labour hold			

=== Hartsholme ===
Location of Hartsholme ward

Hartsholme
Party	Candidate	Votes	%
Conservative	Ronald Hills	814	47.5%
Labour	L. Burke	535	31.2%
Lincoln Independent Alliance	R. Hall	364	21.2%
Turnout			25.3%
Conservative gain from Labour			

=== Minster ===
Location of Minster ward

Minster
Party	Candidate	Votes	%
Conservative	David Gratrick	757	47.4%
Labour	M. Schofield	601	37.7%
Lincoln Independent Alliance	P. Wilkinson	238	14.9%
Turnout			28.9%
Conservative hold			

=== Moorland ===
Location of Moorland ward

Moorland
Party	Candidate	Votes	%
Labour	Denise Moore	686	52.6%
Conservative	D. Fraser	541	41.5%
Lincoln Independent Alliance	J. Webster	76	5.8%
Turnout			22.8%
Labour hold			

=== Park ===
Location of Park ward

Park
Party	Candidate	Votes	%
Labour	Patrick Vaughan	512	55.1%
Conservative	B. Briggs	222	23.9%
Liberal Democrats	J. Merian	128	13.8%
Green	K. Yates	37	4.0%
Lincoln Independent Alliance	B. Freeborough	31	3.3%
Turnout			16.4%
Labour hold			
