= 2002 City of Lincoln Council election =

2002 UK local government election

← 2000	2 May 2002	2003 →

11 of the 33 seats to City of Lincoln Council 17 seats needed for a majority
	First party	Second party
Party	Labour	Conservative
Last election	29	4
Seats won	9	2
Seats after	27	6
Seat change	▼2	▲2
Popular vote	8,502	6,082
Percentage	52.4%	37.5%
- Map showing the results of the 2002 Lincoln City Council elections by ward. Red shows Labour seats and blue shows Conservative seats.
Council control before election
Labour
Council control after election
Labour

Elections to City of Lincoln Council in Lincolnshire, England, were held on 2 May 2002. One third of the council was up for election and the Labour Party stayed in overall control of the council.

After the election, the composition of the council was:

- Labour 27
- Conservative 6

== Election result ==
Lincoln local election result 2002
Party	Seats	Gains	Losses	Net gain/loss	Seats %	Votes %	Votes	+/−
Labour	7	0	2	▼2	63.6	52.4	8,502	
Conservative	4	2	0	▲2	36.4	37.5	6,082	
Lincoln Independent Alliance	0	0	0	Steady	0	7.3	1,184	
Green	0	0	0	Steady	0	2.8	450	

== Ward results ==
=== Abbey ===
Location of Abbey ward

Abbey
Party	Candidate	Votes	%
Labour	Fay Smith	663	64.4
Conservative	Jonathan Gainey	366	35.6
Majority		297	28.8
Turnout		1,029	
Labour hold			

=== Birchwood ===
Location of Birchwood ward

Birchwood
Party	Candidate	Votes	%
Conservative	Edmund Strengiel	672	50.9
Labour	Paul Gowen	560	42.5
Lincoln Independent Alliance	Robert Wells	87	6.6
Majority		112	8.4
Turnout		1,319	
Conservative gain from Labour			

=== Boultham ===
Location of Boultham ward

Boultham
Party	Candidate	Votes	%
Labour	Amode Toofany	749	52.1
Conservative	Darren Grice	327	22.7
Lincoln Independent Alliance	Malcolm Skeels	240	16.7
Liberal Democrats	Daniel Paton	122	8.5
Majority		422	29.4
Turnout		1,438	
Labour hold			

=== Bracebridge ===
Location of Bracebridge ward

Bracebridge
Party	Candidate	Votes	%
Conservative	Hilton Spratt	912	50.1
Labour	Andrew Taylor	688	37.8
Liberal Democrats	Donald Simpson	192	10.6
Lincoln Independent Alliance	Amanda Fletcher	27	1.5
Majority		224	12.3
Turnout		1,819	
Conservative gain from Labour			

=== Carholme ===
Location of Carholme ward

Carholme
Party	Candidate	Votes	%
Labour	Neil Murray	695	45.4
Conservative	Sally-Ann Grice	364	23.8
Liberal Democrats	Daniel Paton	239	15.6
Green	Nicola Watson	147	9.6
Lincoln Independent Alliance	Janet Spencer	87	5.7
Majority		331	21.6
Turnout		1,532	
Labour hold			

=== Castle ===
Location of Castle ward

Castle
Party	Candidate	Votes	%
Labour	Donald Nannestad	714	57.8
Conservative	Beryl Hollands	442	35.8
Lincoln Independent Alliance	Lee Openshaw	80	6.5
Majority		272	22.0
Turnout		1,236	
Labour hold			

=== Glebe ===
Location of Glebe ward

Glebe
Party	Candidate	Votes	%
Labour	Lawrence Wells	692	49.7
Conservative	Phillip Mappin	408	29.3
Lincoln Independent Alliance	George Spencer	292	21.0
Majority		284	20.4
Turnout		1,392	
Labour hold			

=== Hartsholme ===
Location of Hartsholme ward

Hartsholme
Party	Candidate	Votes	%
Conservative	Ronald Hills	814	47.5
Labour	Leslie Burke	535	31.2
Lincoln Independent Alliance	Richard Hall	364	21.2
Majority		279	16.3
Turnout		1,713	
Conservative gain from Labour			

=== Minster ===
Location of Minster ward

Minster
Party	Candidate	Votes	%
Conservative	David Gratrick	757	47.4
Labour	Margaret Schofield	601	37.7
Lincoln Independent Alliance	Paul Wilkinson	238	14.9
Majority		156	9.7
Turnout		1,596	
Conservative gain from Labour			

=== Moorland ===
Location of Moorland ward

Moorland
Party	Candidate	Votes	%
Labour	Denise Moore	686	52.6
Conservative	Duncan Fraser	541	41.5
Lincoln Independent Alliance	John Webster	76	5.8
Majority		145	11.1
Turnout		1,303	
Labour hold			

=== Park ===
Location of Park ward

Park
Party	Candidate	Votes	%
Labour	Patrick Vaughan	512	55.1
Conservative	Barry Briggs	222	23.9
Liberal Democrats	Jack Merian	128	13.8
Green	Kenneth Yates	37	4.0
Lincoln Independent Alliance	Barbara Freeborough	31	3.3
Majority		290	31.2
Turnout		930	
Labour hold			

== By-elections between 2002 and 2003 ==
Boultham By-Election 11 July 2002
Party	Candidate	Votes	%	±%
Labour		605	52.9	▼3.3
Independent		273	23.9	▲5.0
Conservative		265	23.2	0.0
Majority		332	29.0	
Turnout		1,143	20.5	
Labour hold		Swing		
