= 1979 City of Lincoln Council election =

Election held in City of Lincoln Council in 1979

← 1976	3 May 1979	1980 →

All 33 seats to City of Lincoln Council 17 seats needed for a majority
	First party	Second party	Third party
Party	Conservative	Labour	Democratic Labour
Last election	12	0	17
Seats won	21	9	3
Seat change	▲8	▲9	▼14
Popular vote	16,796	14,516	7,462
Percentage	41.2%	35.6%	18.3%
- Map showing the results the 1979 Lincoln City Council elections by ward. Red shows Labour seats, blue shows the Conservatives and orange shows Democratic Labour seats. Striped wards indicate wards with mixed representation.
Council control before election
Democratic Labour
Council control after election
Conservative

The 1979 City of Lincoln Council election took place on 3 May 1979. This was on the same day as other local elections. This was the first election to be held under new ward boundaries. The entire council was up for election and the Conservative Party gained control of the council from the Democratic Labour Party.

== Overall results ==
1979 City of Lincoln Council Election
Party	Seats	Gains	Losses	Net gain/loss	Seats %	Votes %	Votes	+/−
Conservative	21			▲8	63.6	41.2	16,796	▲8.8
Labour	9			▲9	27.3	35.6	14,516	▲10.8
Democratic Labour	3			▼14	9.1	18.3	7,462	▼22.7
Independent	0			Steady	0.0	0.5	195	▼0.3
Liberal	0			Steady	0.0	4.3	1,770	▲3.3
Total	33						85,973	

== Ward results ==
=== Abbey (3 seats) ===
Location of Abbey ward

Abbey (3 seats)
Party	Candidate	Votes	%
Labour	P. Fletcher	1,453	
Labour	A. Gibbons	1,393	
Democratic Labour	K. Carveth	1,384	
Conservative	R. McMahon	1,343	
Democratic Labour	E. Coles	1,319	
Labour	R. Hodson	1,159	
Democratic Labour	C. Hurley	878	
Turnout			76.0%
Labour win (new seat)			
Labour win (new seat)			
Democratic Labour win (new seat)			

=== Birchwood (3 seats) ===
Location of Birchwood ward

Boultham (3 seats)
Party	Candidate	Votes	%
Conservative	L. Crumblehulme	1,321	
Conservative	W. Crumblehulme	1,320	
Conservative	C. Sparkes	1,156	
Labour	G. Turner	1,029	
Democratic Labour	J. Golding	921	
Labour	W. Fowles	871	
Labour	L. Gerrans	837	
Democratic Labour	A. West	699	
Democratic Labour	R. West	603	
Turnout			74.3%
Conservative win (new seat)			
Conservative win (new seat)			
Conservative win (new seat)			

=== Boultham (3 seats) ===
Location of Boultham ward

Boultham (3 seats)
Party	Candidate	Votes	%
Democratic Labour	T. Rook	1,517	
Labour	P. Archer	1,281	
Conservative	B. Stanton	1,137	
Conservative	D. McLeish	1,114	
Conservative	J. Paine	1,076	
Democratic Labour	H. Buttery	1,058	
Labour	A. Toofany	937	
Democratic Labour	M. Snalec	912	
Labour	L. Wells	911	
Turnout			77.7%
Democratic Labour win (new seat)			
Labour win (new seat)			
Conservative win (new seat)			

=== Bracebridge (3 seats) ===
Location of Bracebridge ward

Bracebridge (3 seats)
Party	Candidate	Votes	%
Conservative	E. Jenkins	1,908	
Conservative	R. Bracey	1,778	
Conservative	P. Roe	1,741	
Labour	A. Bull	1,014	
Labour	S. Close	994	
Liberal	R. Hayward	927	
Labour	P. Hurst	871	
Liberal	P. Taylor	848	
Liberal	D. Templeman	794	
Turnout			80.8%
Conservative win (new seat)			
Conservative win (new seat)			
Conservative win (new seat)			

=== Carholme (3 seats) ===
Location of Carholme ward

Carholme (3 seats)
Party	Candidate	Votes	%
Conservative	S. Campbell	2,119	
Conservative	I. Campbell	2,112	
Conservative	C. Ireland	1,972	
Labour	J. Martin	1,413	
Labour	P. Rattigan	1,325	
Labour	D. Smith	1,290	
Turnout			73.0%
Conservative win (new seat)			
Conservative win (new seat)			
Conservative win (new seat)			

=== Castle (3 seats) ===
Location of Castle ward

Castle (3 seats)
Party	Candidate	Votes	%
Labour	N. Jackson	1,644	
Labour	H. Bunnage	1,433	
Conservative	D. Chambers	1,372	
Labour	P. West	1,350	
Conservative	David Gratrick	1,317	
Conservative	P. Hind	1,309	
Liberal	F. Goulding	843	
Liberal	E. Turver	700	
Liberal	D. Hoyes	682	
Turnout			80.0%
Labour win (new seat)			
Labour win (new seat)			
Conservative win (new seat)			

=== Longdales (3 seats) ===
Location of Longdales ward

Longdales (3 seats)
Party	Candidate	Votes	%
Conservative	C. North	1,566	
Conservative	N. McDonald	1,536	
Conservative	R. Long	1,531	
Labour	D. Miller	1,385	
Labour	P. Aylmer	1,252	
Labour	B. Townrow	1,128	
Democratic Labour	R. Barnes	846	
Democratic Labour	L. Davis	768	
Democratic Labour	R. King	665	
Turnout			77.1%
Conservative win (new seat)			
Conservative win (new seat)			
Conservative win (new seat)			

=== Minster (3 seats) ===
Location of Minster ward

Minster (3 seats)
Party	Candidate	Votes	%
Conservative	J. Sullivan	2,240	
Conservative	M. Cass	2,217	
Conservative	F. Horn	2,167	
Labour	J. Ward	1,777	
Labour	S. Walker	1,655	
Labour	R. Mulder	1,631	
Turnout			76.7%
Conservative win (new seat)			
Conservative win (new seat)			
Conservative win (new seat)			

=== Moorland (3 seats) ===
Location of Moorland ward

Moorland (3 seats)
Party	Candidate	Votes	%
Conservative	B. Abbott	1,617	
Conservative	M. Duff	1,459	
Conservative	A. Parker	1,362	
Labour	J. Robertson	1,147	
Labour	N. Baldock	1,119	
Labour	N. Smith	1,067	
Democratic Labour	M. Baguley	636	
Democratic Labour	R. Turner	572	
Democratic Labour	C. Benton	564	
Independent	C. Hurst	195	
Turnout			78.0%
Conservative win (new seat)			
Conservative win (new seat)			
Conservative win (new seat)			

=== Park (3 seats) ===
Location of Park ward

Park (3 seats)
Party	Candidate	Votes	%
Labour	David Jackson	1,223	
Conservative	G. Close	1,146	
Democratic Labour	F. Allen	1,109	
Conservative	M. Brittan	936	
Democratic Labour	L. Shepheard	915	
Conservative	J. Kay	893	
Labour	J. Plant	746	
Democratic Labour	J. Turner	722	
Turnout			70.9%
Labour win (new seat)			
Conservative win (new seat)			
Democratic Labour win (new seat)			

=== Tritton (3 seats) ===
Location of Tritton ward

Tritton (3 seats)
Party	Candidate	Votes	%
Labour	C. Green	1,150	
Labour	C. Meanwell	1,081	
Labour	H. Hubbard	1,061	
Democratic Labour	J. Bates	1,049	
Conservative	G. Read	1,027	
Conservative	R. Brittan	1,013	
Democratic Labour	A. Jackson	977	
Conservative	M. Jaques	929	
Democratic Labour	D. Sanderson	676	
Turnout			79.3%
Labour win (new seat)			
Labour win (new seat)			
Labour win (new seat)			
