= 1995 City of Lincoln Council election =

Election held in City of Lincoln Council in 1995

- 4 May 1995

11 of the 33 seats to City of Lincoln Council 17 seats needed for a majority
	First party	Second party
Party	Labour	Conservative
Last election	30	3
Seats won	11	0
Seats after	31	2
Seat change	▲1	▼1
Popular vote	16,949	5,447
Percentage	72.8%	23.4%
- Map showing the results of the 1995 Lincoln City Council elections by ward. Red shows Labour seats and blue shows Conservative seats.
Council control before election
Labour
Council control after election
Labour

The 1995 City of Lincoln Council election took place on 4 May 1995. This was on the same day as other local elections. One third of the council was up for election: the seats of which were last contested in 1991. The Labour Party retained control of the council.

== Overall results ==
1995 City of Lincoln Council Election
Party	Seats	Gains	Losses	Net gain/loss	Seats %	Votes %	Votes	+/−
Labour	11	1	0	▲1	100.0	72.8	16,949	▲12.9
Conservative	0	0	1	▼1	0.0	23.4	5,447	▼11.9
Liberal Democrats	0	0	0	Steady	0.0	1.0	240	New
Green	0	0	0	Steady	0.0	2.5	573	▼1.9
Independent	0	0	0	Steady	0.0	0.3	68	New
Total	11						23,277	

All comparisons in vote share are to the corresponding 1991 election.

== Ward results ==
=== Abbey ===
Location of Abbey ward

Abbey
Party	Candidate	Votes	%
Labour	Peter West	1,322	78.1%
Conservative	P. Forbes-Ritte	200	11.8%
Green	P. North	102	6.0%
Independent	D. Webb	68	4.0%
Turnout			33.7%
Labour hold			

=== Birchwood ===
Location of Birchwood ward

Birchwood
Party	Candidate	Votes	%
Labour	W. Duncan	2,092	59.6%
Conservative	Edmund Strengiel	1,421	40.4%
Turnout			35.1%
Labour gain from Conservative			

=== Boultham ===
Location of Boultham ward

Boultham
Party	Candidate	Votes	%
Labour	T. Rook	1,414	74.9%
Liberal Democrats	D. Paton	240	12.7%
Conservative	S. Daly	234	12.4%
Turnout			36.9%
Labour hold			

=== Bracebridge ===
Location of Bracebridge ward

Bracebridge
Party	Candidate	Votes	%
Labour	R. Hall	1,602	72.4%
Conservative	R. Meads	611	27.6%
Turnout			38.1%
Labour hold			

=== Carholme ===
Location of Carholme ward

Carholme
Party	Candidate	Votes	%
Labour	L. Richardson	1,548	68.0%
Conservative	Sandra Gratrick	449	19.7%
Green	D. Kane	278	12.2%
Turnout			41.8%
Labour hold			

=== Castle ===
Location of Castle ward

Castle
Party	Candidate	Votes	%
Labour	Anthony Morgan	1,659	79.2%
Conservative	Y. Sampson	322	15.4%
Green	B. Alford	114	5.4%
Turnout			37.5%
Labour hold			

=== Longdales ===
Location of Longdales ward

Longdales
Party	Candidate	Votes	%
Labour	Neil Murray	1,497	74.7%
Conservative	David Gratrick	507	25.3%
Turnout			41.8%
Labour hold			

=== Minster ===
Location of Minster ward

Minster
Party	Candidate	Votes	%
Labour	Jerome O'Brien	1,943	70.9%
Conservative	C. Talbot	799	29.1%
Turnout			37.4%
Labour hold			

=== Moorland ===
Location of Moorland ward

Moorland
Party	Candidate	Votes	%
Labour	Martin Bushell	1,420	75.8%
Conservative	D. Fraser	454	24.2%
Turnout			36.9%
Labour hold			

=== Park ===
Location of Park ward

Park
Party	Candidate	Votes	%
Labour	David Jackson	1,109	80.6%
Conservative	P. Brooks	188	13.7%
Green	K. Yates	79	5.7%
Turnout			27.6%
Labour hold			

=== Tritton ===
Location of Tritton ward

Tritton
Party	Candidate	Votes	%
Labour	Roland Hurst	1,343	83.7%
Conservative	M. Clark	262	16.3%
Turnout			38.7%
Labour hold			
