= 1982 City of Lincoln Council election =

Election held in City of Lincoln Council in 1982

- 6 May 1982

11 of the 33 seats to City of Lincoln Council 17 seats needed for a majority
| | First party | Second party |
|---|---|---|
| Party | Labour | Conservative |
| Last election | 16 | 17 |
| Seats won | 8 | 3 |
| Seats after | 20 | 13 |
| Seat change | ▲4 | ▼4 |
| Popular vote | 10,573 | 8,906 |
| Percentage | 40.7% | 34.3% |
- Map showing the results of the 1982 Lincoln City Council elections by ward. Red shows Labour seats and blue shows the Conservatives seats.
Council control before election
Conservative
Council control after election
Labour

The 1982 City of Lincoln Council election took place on 6 May 1982. This was on the same day as other local elections. One third of the council was up for election: the seats of the second-highest polling candidates at the all out election of 1979. The Labour Party gained control of the council from the Conservative Party.

== Overall results ==
1982 City of Lincoln Council Election
| Party | Seats | Gains | Losses | Net gain/loss | Seats % | Votes % | Votes | +/− |
|---|---|---|---|---|---|---|---|---|
| Labour | 8 | 4 | 0 | ▲4 | 72.7 | 40.7 | 10,573 | |
| Conservative | 3 | 0 | 4 | ▼4 | 27.3 | 34.3 | 8,906 | |
| Alliance | 0 | 0 | 0 | Steady | 0.0 | 24.3 | 6,314 | |
| Ecology | 0 | 0 | 0 | Steady | 0.0 | 0.4 | 116 | |
| Independent | 0 | 0 | 0 | Steady | 0.0 | 0.2 | 53 | |
| Rev Reform | 0 | 0 | 0 | Steady | 0.0 | 0.0 | 11 | |
| Total | 11 | | | | | | 25,973 | |

== Ward results ==
=== Abbey ===
Location of Abbey ward

Abbey
| Party | Candidate | Votes | % |
|---|---|---|---|
| Labour | A. Gibbons | 1,012 | 47.5% |
| Conservative | M. Mellows | 601 | 28.2% |
| Alliance | E. Coles | 519 | 24.3% |
| Turnout | | | 39.7% |
| Labour hold | | | |

=== Birchwood ===
Location of Birchwood ward

Birchwood
| Party | Candidate | Votes | % |
|---|---|---|---|
| Labour | R. Hall | 950 | 44.5% |
| Conservative | W. Crumblehulme | 658 | 30.8% |
| Alliance | F. Hyde | 525 | 24.6% |
| Turnout | | | 40.5% |
| Labour gain from Conservative | | | |

=== Boultham ===
Location of Boultham ward

Boultham
| Party | Candidate | Votes | % |
|---|---|---|---|
| Labour | P. Archer | 945 | 43.2% |
| Conservative | P. Samways | 710 | 32.4% |
| Alliance | B. Smith | 502 | 22.9% |
| Ecology | C. Moulton | 33 | 1.5% |
| Turnout | | | 44.5% |
| Labour hold | | | |

=== Bracebridge ===
Location of Bracebridge ward

Bracebridge
| Party | Candidate | Votes | % |
|---|---|---|---|
| Conservative | R. Bracey | 1,224 | 47.4% |
| Labour | Roland Hurst | 859 | 33.3% |
| Alliance | J. Gill | 500 | 19.4% |
| Turnout | | | 45.5% |
| Conservative hold | | | |

=== Carholme ===
Location of Carholme ward

Carholme
| Party | Candidate | Votes | % |
|---|---|---|---|
| Conservative | I. Campbell | 1,040 | 39.6% |
| Labour | L. Wells | 781 | 29.8% |
| Alliance | F. Goulding | 752 | 28.6% |
| Ecology | S. Moulton | 52 | 2.0% |
| Turnout | | | 47.6% |
| Conservative hold | | | |

=== Castle ===
Location of Castle ward

Castle
| Party | Candidate | Votes | % |
|---|---|---|---|
| Labour | H. Bunnage | 1,214 | 48.6% |
| Conservative | I. Adams | 704 | 28.2% |
| Alliance | J. Kirby | 580 | 23.2% |
| Turnout | | | 48.6% |
| Labour hold | | | |

=== Longdales ===
Location of Longdales ward

Longdales
| Party | Candidate | Votes | % |
|---|---|---|---|
| Conservative | N. McDonald | 1,030 | 42.4% |
| Labour | N. Murray | 973 | 40.1% |
| Alliance | L. Davis | 426 | 17.5% |
| Turnout | | | 49.0% |
| Conservative hold | | | |

=== Minster ===
Location of Minster ward

Minster
| Party | Candidate | Votes | % |
|---|---|---|---|
| Labour | Richard Metcalfe | 1,228 | 38.6% |
| Conservative | Y. Bodger | 1,175 | 37.0% |
| Alliance | B. Bagnall | 722 | 22.7% |
| Independent | M. Erskine | 53 | 1.7% |
| Turnout | | | 51.8% |
| Labour gain from Conservative | | | |

=== Moorland ===
Location of Moorland ward

Moorland
| Party | Candidate | Votes | % |
|---|---|---|---|
| Labour | L. Greenhalgh | 839 | 38.5% |
| Conservative | J. Turner | 723 | 33.2% |
| Alliance | G. Quixley | 606 | 27.8% |
| Rev Reform | T. Kyle | 11 | 0.5% |
| Turnout | | | 44.6% |
| Labour gain from Conservative | | | |

=== Park ===
Location of Park ward

Park
| Party | Candidate | Votes | % |
|---|---|---|---|
| Labour | R. Mason | 780 | 36.6% |
| Alliance | P. Taylor | 699 | 32.8% |
| Conservative | G. Close | 619 | 29.1% |
| Ecology | K. Yates | 31 | 1.5% |
| Turnout | | | 41.9% |
| Labour gain from Conservative | | | |

=== Tritton ===
Location of Tritton ward

Tritton
| Party | Candidate | Votes | % |
|---|---|---|---|
| Labour | C. Meanwell | 992 | 52.3% |
| Conservative | R. Barnes | 483 | 25.5% |
| Alliance | S. Stanton | 422 | 22.2% |
| Turnout | | | 43.4% |
| Labour hold | | | |
