= Abbey, Lincoln =

Suburb and ward of Lincoln in Lincolnshire, England

Coordinates: 53.232701°N 0.516705°W

Abbey
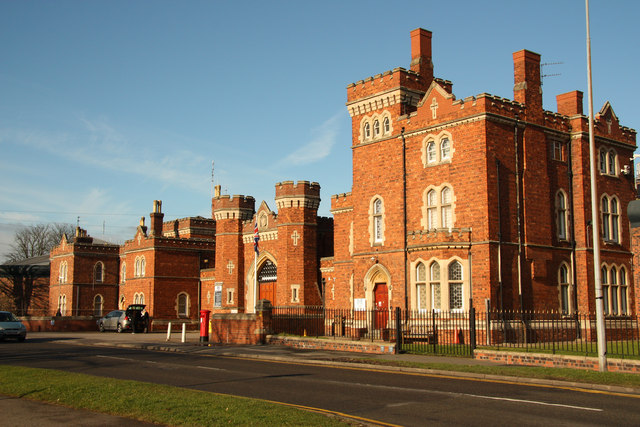
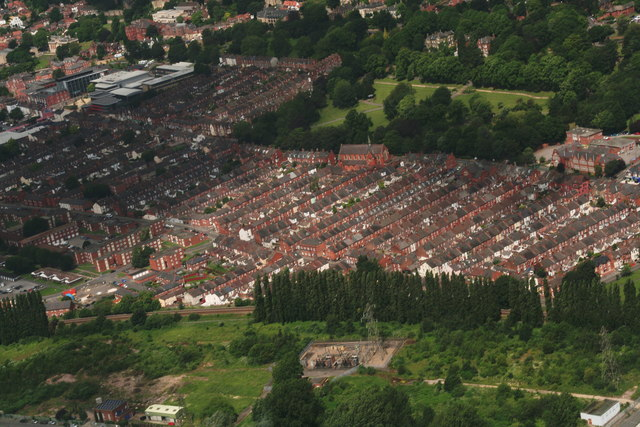
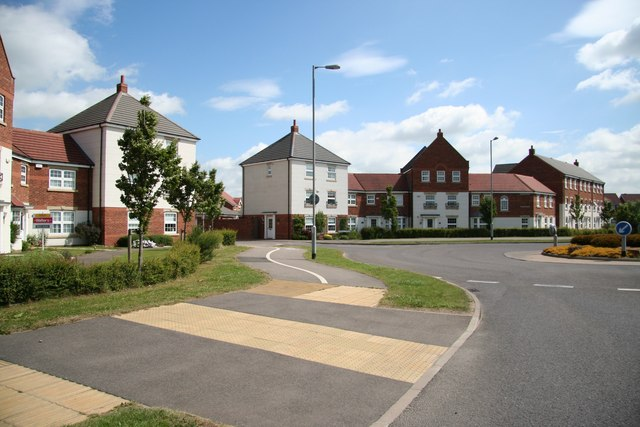
- Clockwise from top: Lincoln Prison, Carlton Boulevard & Monks Road and All Saints Church aerial

- Location within Lincolnshire
- Population: 11,310 (2021 Census Ward Profile)
  - London: 157 mi (253 km) S
- Civil parish: Unparished
- District: Lincoln
- Shire county: Lincolnshire
- Region: East Midlands
- Country: England
- Sovereign state: United Kingdom
- Post town: Lincoln
- Postcode district: LN2
- Dialling code: 01522
- Police: Lincolnshire
- Fire: Lincolnshire
- Ambulance: East Midlands
- UK Parliament: Lincoln
- Councillors: Clare Smalley (Liberal Democrat); Martin Christopher (Liberal Democrat); Natasha Chapman (Liberal Democrat)

Abbey is one of eleven electoral districts within the City of Lincoln Council. As of 2023, the Liberal Democrats hold all three seats in the ward having first taken a seat in the 2021 local elections being the first time a non-Labour Party candidate had won a seat in the ward since 1979. The ward is split between two Lincolnshire County Council divisions, St Giles in the north and Park in the south who respectively have elected a Conservative and Labour county councillor.

== Geography ==
Abbey Ward Map

The ward encompasses a large part of the east of Lincoln, stretching from Danesgate near the centre of town, up part of Lindum Hill, along Monks, Greetwell and Wragby Road, ending at the Carlton Centre bordering West Lindsey. It contains the County Hospital, Lincoln Prison, Greetwell Hollow Nature Reserve, the Usher Art Gallery and the Museum as well as the City of Lincoln Arboretum and the ruins of an abbey on Monks Road. Furthermore, there are two primary and secondary education schools in the ward; Monks Abbey School and Lincoln Carlton Academy as well as Lincoln College on the west end of Monks Road.

Abbey ward contains several areas of high deprivation, with an area in the south of the ward covering Cannon and Croft Street ranking in the top 5% in the UK for economic deprivation with 25.7% of children in poverty.

Approximately 9.4% of 16–18 year olds not in education, employment or training, the second highest in the city and the ward has the highest unemployment rate of all electoral wards in the city, at 10.8%.

== Demographics ==
At the 2021 census, the ward profile population was 11,310. Of the findings, the ethnicity and religious composition of the ward was:

Abbey: Ethnicity: 2021 Census
Ethnic group	Population	%
White	9,766	86.4%
Asian or Asian British	638	5.6%
Black or Black British	317	2.8%
Mixed	305	2.7%
Other Ethnic Group	192	1.7%
Arab	86	0.8%
Total	11,310	100%

The religious composition of the ward at the 2021 Census was recorded as:

Abbey: Religion: 2021 Census
Religious	Population	%
Irreligious	5,032	48.3%
Christian	4,598	44.1%
Muslim	455	4.4%
Other religion	132	1.3%
Hindu	114	1.1%
Buddhist	57	0.5%
Sikh	18	0.3%
Jewish	10	0.2%
Total	11,310	100%

== Councillors ==
Abbey is represented in Westminster by Hamish Falconer MP for Lincoln.

The ward is represented on the City of Lincoln Council by three councillors: Clare Smalley, Martin Christopher and Natasha Chapman. Each of the three were elected in the 2021, 2022 and 2023 local elections respectively, with the latter two defeating incumbent Labour Councillors.

Election	Councillor
2016	K. Brothwell (Labour Party); F. Smith (Labour Party); P. West (Labour Party)
2018	B. Bilton (Labour Party)
2019	J. Loffhagen (Labour Party)
2021	C. Smalley (Liberal Democrat)
2022	M. Christopher (Liberal Democrat)
2023	N. Chapman (Liberal Democrat)

== Electoral history ==
=== 2020s ===
2023 City of Lincoln Council election
Party	Candidate	Votes	%	±%
Liberal Democrats	Natasha Chapman	1,028	56.4	▼6.3
Labour	Jane Loffhagen	493	27.0	▼1.1
Conservative	Roger Hansard	154	8.4	▼0.8
Green	Seamus Murray	92	5.0	▲5.0
Reform	Benjamin Jackson	57	3.1	▲3.1
Majority		535	29.4	
Turnout		1,824	29.8	
Liberal Democrats gain from Labour		Swing	▼2.6	

2022 City of Lincoln Council election
Party	Candidate	Votes	%	±%
Liberal Democrats	Martin Christopher	1,220	62.7	▲13.1
Labour	Bill Bilton	546	28.1	▲0.1
Conservative	Roger Hansard	180	9.2	▼6.3
Majority		674	34.6	
Turnout		1,946		
Liberal Democrats gain from Labour		Swing	▲6.5	

2021 City of Lincoln Council election
Party	Candidate	Votes	%	±%
Liberal Democrats	Clare Smalley	974	49.6	▲24.8
Labour	Val Moore	549	28.0	▼22.7
Conservative	Roger Hansard	305	15.5	▲2.0
Green	Kenneth Yates	99	5.0	▼6.1
Reform	Donald Penman	36	1.8	▲1.8
Majority		425	21.6	
Turnout		1,963		
Liberal Democrats gain from Labour		Swing	▲23.8	

=== 2010s ===
2019 City of Lincoln Council election
Party	Candidate	Votes	%
Labour	Jane Loffhagen	679	42
Liberal Democrats	Clare Smalley	478	29
Conservative	Adam Clegg	260	16
Green	Edward Francis	214	13
Majority		201	13
Turnout		28.27	
Labour hold			

2018 City of Lincoln Council election
Party	Candidate	Votes	%
Labour	Bill Bilton	850	52.0
Conservative	Richard Butroid	348	21.3
Liberal Democrats	Clare Smalley	311	19.0
Green	Edward Evelyn Francis	126	7.7
Majority		502	30.7
Turnout		28%	
Labour hold			

2016 City of Lincoln Council election (3)
Party	Candidate	Votes	%
Labour	Kathleen Brothwell	877	19.3%
Labour	Fay Smith	833	18.3%
Labour	Peter West	790	17.4%
Conservative	Graham Bratby	381	8.4%
Conservative	Douglas Collison	303	6.7%
Conservative	Caleb Harris	286	6.3%
UKIP	Chris Butler	271	6.0%
Green	Kenneth Yates	247	5.4%
Liberal Democrats	Clare Smalley	191	4.2%
Liberal Democrats	Michael Brown	188	4.1%
TUSC	Nick Parker	64	1.4%
TUSC	Gavyn Graham	61	1.3%
TUSC	Jac Green	54	1.2%
Turnout		4,546	
Labour win (new seat)			
Labour win (new seat)			
Labour win (new seat)			

2015 City of Lincoln Council election
Party	Candidate	Votes	%
Labour	Fay Smith	1,730	42.9%
Conservative	Yaroslav Pustarnakov	1,034	25.7%
UKIP	Chris Butler	568	14.1%
Green	James Bird	417	10.3%
Liberal Democrats	Aarron Smith	207	5.1%
TUSC	Danny Wilkinson	74	1.8%
Turnout		4,030	55.9%
Labour hold			

2014 City of Lincoln Council election
Party	Candidate	Votes	%
Labour	Peter West	744	43.2%
UKIP	Chris Butler	385	22.3%
Conservative	Christopher Reid	364	21.1%
Liberal Democrats	Heather Cullen	138	8.0%
TUSC	Nick Parker	93	5.4%
Majority		359	20.9%
Turnout		1,724	
Labour hold			

2012 City of Lincoln Council election
Party	Candidate	Votes	%
Labour	Kath Brothwell	892	57.3%
Conservative	Laura Goodliffe	386	24.8%
Liberal Democrats	Natasha Chapman	141	9.1%
TUSC	Gavyn Graham	139	8.9%
Majority		506	32.5%
Turnout		1,558	23.4%
Labour hold			

2011 City of Lincoln Council election
Party	Candidate	Votes	%
Labour	Fay Smith	1,052	48.3%
Conservative	Barry Reeves	619	28.4%
Liberal Democrats	Charly Harding-Price	236	10.8%
UKIP	Pat Nurse	151	6.9%
TUSC	Richard Steven Banks	120	5.5%
Majority		433	19.9%
Turnout		2,178	31.16%
Labour hold			

2010 City of Lincoln Council election
Party	Candidate	Votes	%
Labour	Peter West	1,438	37.0%
Conservative	James Clarkson	1,155	29.7%
Liberal Democrats	Matthew Holden	1,018	26.2%
UKIP	Pat Nurse	207	5.3%
TUSC	Richard Banks	71	1.8%
Majority		283	7.3%
Turnout		3,889	55.5%
Labour hold			

=== 2000s ===
2008 City of Lincoln Council election
Party	Candidate	Votes	%
Labour	Kath Brothwell	657	40.0%
Conservative	Cordelia McCartney	625	38.1%
Liberal Democrats	Heather Cullen	259	15.8%
UKIP	Carol Pearson	101	6.2%
Majority		32	1.9%
Turnout		1,642	25.2%
Labour hold			
