= 2022 City of Lincoln Council election =

UK local election

← 2021	5 May 2022	2023 →

11 of the 33 seats to City of Lincoln Council 17 seats needed for a majority
- Turnout: 29.07%
	First party	Second party	Third party
Leader	Ric Metcalfe	Thomas Dyer	Clare Smalley
Party	Labour	Conservative	Liberal Democrats
Last election	22	10	1
Seats won	7	3	1
Seats after	22	9	2
Seat change	Steady	▼1	▲1
Popular vote	8,216	6,081	2,688
Percentage	45.2%	33.5%	14.8%
Swing	▲4.5%	▼8.2%	▲6.0%
- Map showing the results of the 2022 Lincoln City Council elections by ward. Red shows Labour, blue shows the Conservatives and orange shows the Liberal Democrats.
Council control before election
Labour
Council control after election
Labour

The 2022 City of Lincoln Council election took place on 5 May 2022 to elect members of City of Lincoln Council in Lincolnshire, England. This was held on the same day as other local elections.

== Pre-election composition ==
Pre-Election Composition
Party	Seats
Labour	22
Conservative	10
Liberal Democrat	1

== Councillors standing down ==
Councillor	Ward	First elected	Party	Date announced
Laura Angela McWilliams	Carholme	2018	Labour	6 April 2022
Andrew Kerry	Hartsholme	2008	Conservative	6 April 2022
Helena Mair	Park	2016	Labour	6 April 2022

== Results summary ==
2022 City of Lincoln Council election
Party	This election			Full council			This election		
Party	Seats	Net	Seats %	Other	Total	Total %	Votes	Votes %	+/−
Labour	7	Steady	63.6	15	22	66.7	8,216	45.2	+4.5
Conservative	3	▼1	27.3	6	9	27.3	6,081	33.5	-8.2
Liberal Democrats	1	▲1	9.1	1	2	6.1	2,688	14.8	+6.0
Green	0	Steady	0.0	0	0	0.0	1,128	6.2	-1.7
TUSC	0	Steady	0.0	0	0	0.0	62	0.3	-0.1

== Ward results ==
=== Abbey ===
Abbey
Party	Candidate	Votes	%	±%
Liberal Democrats	Martin Christopher	1,220	62.7	+13.1
Labour	Bill Bilton	546	28.1	+0.1
Conservative	Roger Hansard	180	9.3	−6.2
Majority		674	34.6	
Turnout		1,946		
Liberal Democrats gain from Labour		Swing	▲6.5	

=== Birchwood ===
Birchwood
Party	Candidate	Votes	%	±%
Conservative	Alan Briggs	723	48.6	−9.6
Labour	Sean Burke-Ulyat	609	41.0	+6.9
Green	John Radford	83	5.6	+1.0
Liberal Democrats	Stephen Chapman	72	4.8	+1.7
Majority		114	7.6	
Turnout		1,487		
Conservative hold		Swing	▼8.3	

=== Boultham ===
Boultham
Party	Candidate	Votes	%	±%
Labour	Gary Hewson	778	55.3	+8.9
Conservative	Daniel Carvalho	444	31.6	−9.0
Liberal Democrats	Sarah Uldall	96	6.8	+1.8
Green	Kenneth Yates	89	6.3	−1.7
Majority		334	23.7	
Turnout		1,407		
Labour hold		Swing	▲9.0	

=== Carholme ===
Carholme
Party	Candidate	Votes	%	±%
Labour Co-op	Emily Wood	1,020	57.8	−1.9
Conservative	Thomas Hulme	318	18.0	−4.2
Green	Nicola Watson	220	12.5	+2.2
Liberal Democrats	Oliver Craven	145	8.2	+3.6
TUSC	Nick Parker	62	3.5	+1.8
Majority		702	39.8	
Turnout		1,765		
Labour Co-op hold		Swing	▲1.2	

=== Castle ===
Castle
Party	Candidate	Votes	%	±%
Labour	Loraine Woolley	957	58.9	+9.2
Conservative	George Clark	378	23.3	−13.2
Green	Lauren Ross	164	10.1	+0.9
Liberal Democrats	Aidan Turner	125	7.7	+3.1
Majority		579	35.6	
Turnout		1,624		
Labour hold		Swing	▲11.2	

=== Glebe ===
Glebe
Party	Candidate	Votes	%	±%
Labour	Patrick Vaughan	581	36.8	−7.6
Conservative	Jeanette Pavey	479	30.3	−12.3
Liberal Democrats	Aiden Wells	413	26.2	N/A
Green	Tjeerd Carter-Tijmstra	106	6.7	−6.3
Majority		102	6.5	
Turnout		1,579		
Labour hold		Swing	▲2.4	

=== Hartsholme ===
Hartsholme
Party	Candidate	Votes	%	±%
Conservative	Rachel Storer	971	49.9	−7.6
Labour Co-op	Callum Roper	748	38.5	+9.2
Liberal Democrats	Jim Charters	226	11.6	+7.4
Majority		223	11.4	
Turnout		1,945		
Conservative hold		Swing	▼8.4	

=== Minster ===
Minster
Party	Candidate	Votes	%	±%
Labour	Joshua Wells	922	49.5	+9.6
Conservative	Christopher Reid	721	38.7	−10.9
Green	Valerie Wilkinson	112	6.0	+1.6
Liberal Democrats	Felicity Christopher	108	5.8	−0.3
Majority		201	10.8	
Turnout		1,863		
Labour gain from Conservative		Swing	▲10.3	

=== Moorland ===
Moorland
Party	Candidate	Votes	%	±%
Labour	Adrianna McNulty	701	45.9	+3.7
Conservative	Pete Edwards	644	42.2	−5.7
Green	Christopher Padley	100	6.6	−0.1
Liberal Democrats	Ross Pepper	81	5.3	+2.1
Majority		57	3.7	
Turnout		1,526		
Labour hold		Swing	▲4.7	

=== Park ===
Park
Party	Candidate	Votes	%	±%
Labour Co-op	Debbie Armiger	706	57.3	+5.8
Conservative	Liam Sperrin	296	24.0	−4.1
Green	Sally Horscroft	150	12.2	+1.3
Liberal Democrats	Natasha Chapman	81	6.6	−0.4
Majority		410	33.3	
Turnout		1,233		
Labour hold		Swing	▲5.0	

=== Witham ===
Witham
Party	Candidate	Votes	%	±%
Conservative	Hilton Spratt	927	51.5	−6.7
Labour Co-op	Calvin Bissitt	648	36.0	+6.6
Liberal Democrats	Ben Atkinson	121	6.7	+2.5
Green	Victoria Sonnenberg	104	5.8	−0.7
Majority		279	15.5	
Turnout		1,800		
Conservative hold		Swing	▼6.7	
