= 2021 City of Lincoln Council election =

UK local election

← 2019	6 May 2021	2022 →

11 of the 33 seats to City of Lincoln Council 17 seats needed for a majority
- Turnout: 31.27%
	First party	Second party	Third party
Leader	Ric Metcalfe	Thomas Dyer	Clare Smalley
Party	Labour	Conservative	Liberal Democrats
Last election	24	9	0
Seats won	5	5	1
Seats after	22	10	1
Seat change	▼2	▲1	▲1
Popular vote	7,921	8,114	1,709
Percentage	40.7%	41.7%	8.8%
Swing	▼3.5%	▲11.0%	▼2.9%
- Map showing the results of the 2021 Lincoln City Council elections by ward. Red shows Labour, blue shows the Conservatives and orange shows the Liberal Democrats.
Council control before election
Labour
Council control after election
Labour

The 2021 City of Lincoln Council election took place on 6 May 2021 to elect members of City of Lincoln Council in Lincolnshire, England. This was held on the same day as other local elections. One third of 33 seats were up for election, with one councillor in each of the 11 wards being elected. As the election in 2016 had been an all-out election with new ward boundaries, the seats of the candidates that had finished first in each ward in the all-out 2016 election were now up for election.

== Results summary ==
2021 Lincoln City Council election
Party	This election			Full council			This election		
Party	Seats	Net	Seats %	Other	Total	Total %	Votes	Votes %	+/−
Labour	5	▼2	45.5	17	22	66.7	7,921	40.7	-3.5
Conservative	5	▲1	45.5	5	10	30.3	8,114	41.7	+11.0
Liberal Democrats	1	▲1	9.1	0	1	3.0	1,709	8.8	-2.9
Green	0	Steady	0.0	0	0	0.0	1,530	7.9	-4.9
Reform UK	0	Steady	0.0	0	0	0.0	69	0.4	New
TUSC	0	Steady	0.0	0	0	0.0	69	0.4	New
Liberal	0	Steady	0.0	0	0	0.0	29	0.1	New

== Ward results ==
=== Abbey ===
Abbey
Party	Candidate	Votes	%	±%
Liberal Democrats	Clare Smalley	974	49.6	+24.8
Labour	Val Moore	549	28.0	−22.7
Conservative	Roger Hansard	305	15.5	−0.4
Green	Kenneth Yates	99	5.0	−6.1
Reform UK	Donald Penman	36	1.8	+1.8
Majority		425	21.6	+9.3
Turnout		1,963		
Liberal Democrats gain from Labour		Swing	▲23.8	

=== Birchwood ===
Birchwood
Party	Candidate	Votes	%	±%
Conservative	Eddie Strengiel	958	58.2	+20.1
Labour Co-op	Paul Gowen	562	34.1	−13.4
Green	John Radford	76	4.6	−4.9
Liberal Democrats	Stephen Chapman	51	3.1	−1.9
Majority		396	24.1	+14.7
Turnout		1,647		
Conservative hold		Swing	▲16.8	

=== Boultham ===
Boultham
Party	Candidate	Votes	%	±%
Labour Co-op	Calum Watt	704	46.4	−1.0
Conservative	Daniel Carvalho	615	40.6	+10.5
Green	Simon Tooke	121	8.0	−5.9
Liberal Democrats	Charles Parker	76	5.0	−3.6
Majority		89	5.8	−11.5
Turnout		1,516		
Labour Co-op hold		Swing	▼5.8	

=== Carholme ===
Carholme
Party	Candidate	Votes	%	±%
Labour Co-op	Lucinda Preston	1,171	59.7	+16.2
Conservative	Jack Choi	436	22.2	+11.8
Green	Nicola Watson	203	10.3	+1.0
Liberal Democrats	Oliver Craven	90	4.6	−27.5
TUSC	Aston Readings	33	1.7	+1.7
Liberal	Charles Shaw	29	1.5	+1.5
Majority		735	37.5	+26.1
Turnout		1,962		
Labour Co-op hold		Swing	▲2.2	

=== Castle ===
Castle
Party	Candidate	Votes	%	±%
Labour	Donald Nannestad	842	49.7	+0.2
Conservative	Rachel Storer	618	36.5	+10.8
Green	Norman Haigh	155	9.2	−7.9
Liberal Democrats	Aidan Turner	78	4.6	−3.1
Majority		224	13.2	−10.6
Turnout		1,693		
Labour hold		Swing	▼5.3	

=== Glebe ===
Glebe
Party	Candidate	Votes	%	±%
Labour	Ric Metcalfe	705	44.4	+0.9
Conservative	Jacob D'Avenant	677	42.6	+10.0
Green	Fiona McKenna	207	13.0	−2.8
Majority		28	1.8	−9.1
Turnout		1,589		
Labour hold		Swing	▼4.6	

=== Hartsholme ===
Hartsholme
Party	Candidate	Votes	%	±%
Conservative	David Clarkson	1,229	57.5	+22.5
Labour	Adelle Ellis	626	29.3	−18.0
Green	Matt Parr	194	9.1	−4.0
Liberal Democrats	James Charters	90	4.2	−0.4
Majority		603	28.2	+15.9
Turnout		2,139		
Conservative hold		Swing	▲20.3	

=== Minster ===
Minster
Party	Candidate	Votes	%	±%
Conservative	Mark Storer	955	49.6	+13.2
Labour	Joshua Wells	769	39.9	−3.0
Liberal Democrats	Richard Dale	118	6.1	−3.0
Green	Valerie Wilkinson	84	4.4	−7.2
Majority		186	9.7	+3.2
Turnout		1,926		
Conservative hold		Swing	▲8.1	

=== Moorland ===
Moorland
Party	Candidate	Votes	%	±%
Conservative	Matthew Fido	796	47.9	+11.9
Labour	Geoff Ellis	701	42.2	−3.2
Green	Christopher Padley	112	6.7	−5.4
Liberal Democrats	Ben Atkinson	53	3.2	−3.3
Majority		95	5.7	−3.7
Turnout		1,662		
Conservative gain from Labour		Swing	▲7.6	

=== Park ===
Park
Party	Candidate	Votes	%	±%
Labour Co-op	Chris Burke	719	51.5	−3.7
Conservative	Liam Sperrin	392	28.1	+9.8
Green	Sally Horscroft	152	10.9	−6.4
Liberal Democrats	Natasha Chapman	98	7.0	−2.2
TUSC	Nick Parker	36	2.6	+2.6
Majority		327	23.4	−13.5
Turnout		1,397		
Labour Co-op hold		Swing	▼6.8	

=== Witham ===
Witham
Party	Candidate	Votes	%	±%
Conservative	Bill Mara	1,133	58.2	+2.9
Labour	Joshua Hutchins	573	29.4	+1.4
Green	Amanda Parr	127	6.5	−4.3
Liberal Democrats	Sarah Uldall	81	4.2	−1.6
Reform UK	Deborah Guthrie	33	1.7	+1.7
Majority		560	28.8	+1.5
Turnout		1,947		
Conservative hold		Swing	▲0.8	
