= 2019 City of Lincoln Council election =

2019 UK local government election

← 2018	3 May 2019	2021 →

11 of the 33 seats to City of Lincoln Council 17 seats needed for a majority
- Turnout: 31.27%
	First party	Second party
Party	Labour	Conservative
Last election	24	9
Seats won	10	1
Seats after	24	9
Seat change	Steady	Steady
Popular vote	7,805	5,430
Percentage	44.2%	30.7%
- Map showing the results of the 2019 Lincoln City Council elections by ward. Red shows Labour seats and blue shows the Conservatives.
Council control before election
Labour
Council control after election
Labour

The 2019 City of Lincoln Council election took place on 3 May 2019 to elect members of City of Lincoln Council in Lincolnshire, England. This was held on the same day as other local elections. One third of 33 seats were up for election, with one councillor in each of the 11 wards being elected. As the election in 2016 had been an all-out election with new ward boundaries, the seats of the candidates that had finished second in each ward in the all-out 2016 election were now up for election.

== Overall results ==
2019 City of Lincoln Council Election Result
Party	Seats	Gains	Losses	Net gain/loss	Seats %	Votes %	Votes	+/−
Labour	10	0	0	Steady	90.9	44.2	7,805	
Conservative	1	0	0	Steady	9.1	30.7	5,430	
Liberal Democrats	0	0	0	Steady	0.0	11.7	2,074	
Green	0	0	0	Steady	0.0	12.8	2,264	
Independent	0	0	0	Steady	0.0	0.5	86	

== Ward results ==
=== Abbey ===
Location of Abbey ward

Abbey
Party	Candidate	Votes	%	±%
Labour	Jane Loffhagen	679	41.6	−10.4
Liberal Democrats	Clare Smalley	478	29.3	+10.3
Conservative	Adam Clegg	260	15.9	−5.4
Green	Edward Francis	214	13.1	+5.4
Majority		201	12.3	−18.4
Turnout		1,631	28.3	
Labour hold		Swing	▼10.4	

=== Birchwood ===
Location of Birchwood ward

Birchwood
Party	Candidate	Votes	%	±%
Labour	Rosanne Kirk	771	47.5	+8.0
Conservative	David Clarkson	618	38.1	+9.3
Green	Seth Goddard	154	9.5	+6.5
Liberal Democrats	Matthew Brooks	81	5.0	+0.9
Majority		153	9.4	+1.4
Turnout		1,624		
Labour hold		Swing	▼0.7	

=== Boultham ===
Location of Boultham ward

Boultham
Party	Candidate	Votes	%	±%
Labour	Liz Bushell	599	47.4	−11.4
Conservative	Sharon Longhorn	380	30.1	−1.3
Green	Simon Took	176	13.9	+9.0
Liberal Democrats	Kian Hearnshaw	108	8.6	+3.8
Majority		219	17.3	−10.1
Turnout		1,263		
Labour hold		Swing	▼5.1	

=== Carholme ===
Location of Carholme ward

Carholme
Party	Candidate	Votes	%	±%
Labour	Neil Murray	825	43.5	−9.6
Liberal Democrats	Oliver Craven	609	32.1	+8.3
Conservative	Alexander Newman-Taylor	198	10.4	−5.0
Green	Nicola Watson	177	9.3	+4.1
Independent	Charles Shaw	86	4.5	+4.5
Majority		216	11.4	−17.9
Turnout		1,895		
Labour hold		Swing	▼9.0	

=== Castle ===
Location of Castle ward

Castle
Party	Candidate	Votes	%	±%
Labour	Rebecca Longbottom	752	49.5	−4.9
Conservative	Oliver Peeke	390	25.7	−7.9
Green	Lynne Allison	259	17.1	+9.9
Liberal Democrats	James Brown	117	7.7	+3.0
Majority		362	23.8	+3.1
Turnout		1,518		
Labour hold		Swing	▲1.5	

=== Glebe ===
Location of Glebe ward

Glebe
Party	Candidate	Votes	%	±%
Labour	Jackie Kirk	640	43.5	−7.2
Conservative	Mark Storer	480	32.6	−5.0
Green	Fiona McKenna	232	15.8	+8.3
Liberal Democrats	William Francis	119	8.1	+3.9
Majority		160	10.9	−2.3
Turnout		1,471		
Labour hold		Swing	▼1.1	

=== Hartsholme ===
Location of Hartsholme ward

Hartsholme
Party	Candidate	Votes	%	±%
Labour	Biff Bean	965	47.3	+9.1
Conservative	Sophie Bennett	713	35.0	−15.2
Green	John Radford	268	13.1	+4.9
Liberal Democrats	Stephen Chapman	93	4.6	+0.4
Majority		252	12.3	+0.2
Turnout		2,039		
Labour hold		Swing	▲12.2	

=== Minster ===
Location of Minster ward

Minster
Party	Candidate	Votes	%	±%
Labour	Naomi Tweddle	745	42.9	+2.7
Conservative	Jake Monteiro	633	36.4	−6.6
Green	Valerie Wilkinson	202	11.6	+8.2
Liberal Democrats	Nicole Pouncey	158	9.1	+4.1
Majority		112	6.5	+3.7
Turnout		1,738		
Labour hold		Swing	▲6.0	

=== Moorland ===
Location of Moorland ward

Moorland
Party	Candidate	Votes	%	±%
Labour	Bob Bushell	638	45.4	−5.5
Conservative	Matthew Fido	505	36.0	−5.8
Green	Christopher Padley	170	12.1	+8.6
Liberal Democrats	Ross Pepper	91	6.5	+2.7
Majority		133	9.4	+0.3
Turnout		1,404		
Labour hold		Swing	▲0.2	

=== Park ===
Location of Park ward

Park
Party	Candidate	Votes	%	±%
Labour	Sue Burke	669	55.2	−4.7
Conservative	Richard Butroid	222	18.3	−1.5
Green	Sally Horscroft	210	17.3	+9.3
Liberal Democrats	Natasha Chapman	112	9.2	+4.0
Majority		447	36.9	−3.0
Turnout		1,213		
Labour hold		Swing	▼1.6	

=== Witham ===
Location of Witham ward

Witham
Party	Candidate	Votes	%	±%
Conservative	Thomas Dyer	1,031	55.3	+0.8
Labour	Calum Watt	522	28.0	−10.0
Green	Michele Servaud	202	10.8	+7.5
Liberal Democrats	Oliver Hemming	108	5.8	+1.6
Majority		509	27.3	+10.8
Turnout		1,863		
Conservative hold		Swing	▲5.4	
