= 2023 City of Lincoln Council election =

UK local election

← 2022	4 May 2023	2024 →

11 of the 33 seats to City of Lincoln Council 17 seats needed for a majority
- Turnout: 29.38%
	First party	Second party	Third party
Leader	Ric Metcalfe	Thomas Dyer	Clare Smalley
Party	Labour	Conservative	Liberal Democrats
Last election	22	9	2
Seats won	8	1	2
Seats after	20	9	4
Seat change	▼2	Steady	▲2
Popular vote	9,020	4,732	3,053
Percentage	49.2%	25.8%	16.7%
Swing	▲4.0%	▼7.6%	▲1.9%
- Map showing the results of the 2023 Lincoln City Council elections by ward. Red shows Labour, blue shows the Conservatives and orange shows the Liberal Democrats.
Leader before election
Ric Metcalfe
Labour
Leader after election
Ric Metcalfe
Labour

The 2023 City of Lincoln Council election took place on 4 May 2023 to elect members of City of Lincoln Council in Lincolnshire, England. It was held on the same day as other local elections across England. This election did not result in a change of control of the council as Labour retained a majority, but did result in a doubling of the size of the Liberal Democrat council group at the expense of two Labour councillors.

== Background ==
In the lead up to the election, two primary issues took centre-stage in Lincoln, first; in February 2023 it was announced by the Council that the Christmas Market was to be cancelled, prompting criticism from the local Conservatives and Liberal Democrats, as well as the MP for Lincoln, Karl McCartney, who described it as "a shallow, stupid and shoddy decision". Secondly, the Government announced plans to turn RAF Scampton into an asylum housing facility, prompting local campaigns aimed at preventing it. Both of these issues were taken up by parties involved in the elections, and were campaigning points for candidates across the city.

The Labour campaign focused on cost-of-living relief, tackling the housing crisis, investment in public spaces and the net zero target of the Council. The Conservatives meanwhile pledged to reinstate the Christmas Market, freeze the council’s parking charges, improve local infrastructure with more seating, trees and biodiversity and promised a commitment to tackle Fly-Tipping, Littering and Anti-social behaviour with increased fines and enforcement. Finally, the Liberal Democrats campaigned against the "shambolic" national Conservative record and pointed to "Labour’s record... Christmas market cancelled without consultation, bus shelters axed, hundreds of damp homes needing mould treatment."

=== Pre-election composition ===
Pre-Election Composition
Party	Seats
Labour	20
Conservative	9
Liberal Democrat	2

=== Councillors standing down ===
Councillor	Ward	First elected	Party	Date announced
Rosanne Kirk	Birchwood	2012	Labour	2 March 2023

== Results summary ==
2023 Lincoln City Council election
Party	This election			Full council			This election		
Party	Seats	Net	Seats %	Other	Total	Total %	Votes	Votes %	+/−
Labour	8	▼2	72.7	12	20	60.6	9,020	49.2	+4.0
Conservative	1	Steady	9.1	8	9	27.3	4,732	25.8	-7.6
Liberal Democrats	2	▲2	18.2	2	4	12.1	3,053	16.7	+1.9
Green	0	Steady	0.0	0	0	0.0	815	4.4	-1.8
Reform	0	Steady	0.0	0	0	0.0	420	2.3	New
Independent	0	Steady	0.0	0	0	0.0	204	1.1	New
TUSC	0	Steady	0.0	0	0	0.0	64	0.4	+0.1
Liberal	0	Steady	0.0	0	0	0.0	18	0.1	New

== Ward results ==
=== Abbey ===
Abbey
Party	Candidate	Votes	%	±%
Liberal Democrats	Natasha Chapman	1,028	56.4	−6.3
Labour	Jane Loffhagen	493	27.0	−1.1
Conservative	Roger Hansard	154	8.4	−0.8
Green	Seamus Murray	92	5.0	+5.0
Reform	Benjamin Jackson	57	3.1	+3.1
Majority		535	29.4	
Turnout		1,824	29.8	
Liberal Democrats gain from Labour		Swing	▼2.6	

=== Birchwood ===
Birchwood
Party	Candidate	Votes	%	±%
Labour	Dylan Stothard	683	45.1	+4.1
Conservative	Jamie Cave	603	39.8	−7.8
Liberal Democrats	Stephen Chapman	118	7.8	+3.0
Reform	Tony Todd	111	7.3	+7.3
Majority		80	5.3	
Turnout		1,515	25.7	
Labour hold		Swing	▲6.0	

=== Boultham ===
Boultham
Party	Candidate	Votes	%	±%
Labour	Liz Bushell	805	59.0	+3.7
Conservative	Daniel Carvalho	348	25.5	−6.1
Green	David Kenyon	111	8.1	+1.8
Liberal Democrats	Sarah Uldall	100	7.3	+0.5
Majority		457	33.5	
Turnout		1,364	26.9	
Labour hold		Swing	▲4.9	

=== Carholme ===
Carholme
Party	Candidate	Votes	%	±%
Labour	Neil Murray	1,066	58.9	+1.1
Conservative	Thomas Hulme	216	12.0	−6.0
Independent	John Bustin	204	11.4	+11.4
Green	Nicola Watson	152	8.5	−4.0
Liberal Democrats	Charlotte Morris	84	4.7	−3.5
TUSC	Nick Parker	64	3.6	+0.1
Liberal	Charles Shaw	18	1.0	+1.0
Majority		850	46.9	
Turnout		1,804	34.2	
Labour hold		Swing	▲3.6	

=== Castle ===
Castle
Party	Candidate	Votes	%	±%
Labour	Rebecca Longbottom	974	62.4	+3.5
Conservative	Henry Osborne	304	19.5	−3.8
Green	Lauren Ross	157	10.1	0.0
Liberal Democrats	Aidan Turner	126	8.1	+0.4
Majority		670	42.9	
Turnout		1,561	29.5	
Labour hold		Swing	▲3.7	

=== Glebe ===
Glebe
Party	Candidate	Votes	%	±%
Liberal Democrats	Aiden Wells	1,020	57.6	+31.4
Labour	Jackie Kirk	464	26.2	−10.6
Conservative	Jeanette Pavey	223	12.6	−17.7
Green	Tjeerd Carter	63	3.6	−3.1
Majority		556	31.4	
Turnout		1,770	31.0	
Liberal Democrats gain from Labour		Swing	▲21.0	

=== Hartsholme ===
Hartsholme
Party	Candidate	Votes	%	±%
Labour	Biff Bean	1,374	61.8	+23.3
Conservative	Barnabas Bell	612	27.5	−22.4
Liberal Democrats	Jim Charters	134	6.0	−5.6
Reform	Jane Smith	103	4.6	+4.6
Majority		762	34.3	
Turnout		2,223	35.4	
Labour hold		Swing	▲22.9	

=== Minster ===
Minster
Party	Candidate	Votes	%	±%
Labour Co-op	Naomi Tweddle	906	51.0	+2.5
Conservative	Victoria Brooks	632	35.6	−3.1
Green	Valerie Wilkinson	97	5.5	−0.5
Liberal Democrats	Emily Morris	80	4.5	−1.3
Reform	Alex Cambo	62	3.5	+3.5
Majority		274	15.4	+4.6
Turnout		1,777	33.5	
Labour Co-op hold		Swing	▲2.8	

=== Moorland ===
Moorland
Party	Candidate	Votes	%	±%
Labour	Bob Bushell	768	53.3	+7.4
Conservative	Pete Edwards	535	37.1	−5.1
Liberal Democrats	Ross Pepper	138	9.6	+4.3
Majority		233	16.2	
Turnout		1,441	25.7	
Labour hold		Swing	▲6.3	

=== Park ===
Park
Party	Candidate	Votes	%	±%
Labour Co-op	Sue Burke	760	63.4	+6.1
Conservative	George Clark	209	17.4	−6.5
Green	Sally Horscroft	143	11.9	−0.3
Liberal Democrats	Olly Craven	86	7.2	+0.6
Majority		551	45.9	
Turnout		1,198	19.9	
Labour Co-op hold		Swing	▲6.3	

=== Witham ===
Witham
Party	Candidate	Votes	%	±%
Conservative	Thomas Dyer	896	48.5	−3.2
Labour Co-op	Calvin Bissitt	727	39.3	+3.3
Liberal Democrats	Felicity Christopher	139	7.5	+0.8
Reform	Nick Smith	87	4.7	+4.7
Majority		169	9.2	
Turnout		1,849	30.9	
Conservative hold		Swing	▼3.3	
