= Guildhall and Stonebow, Lincoln =

Municipal building in Lincoln, Lincolnshire, England

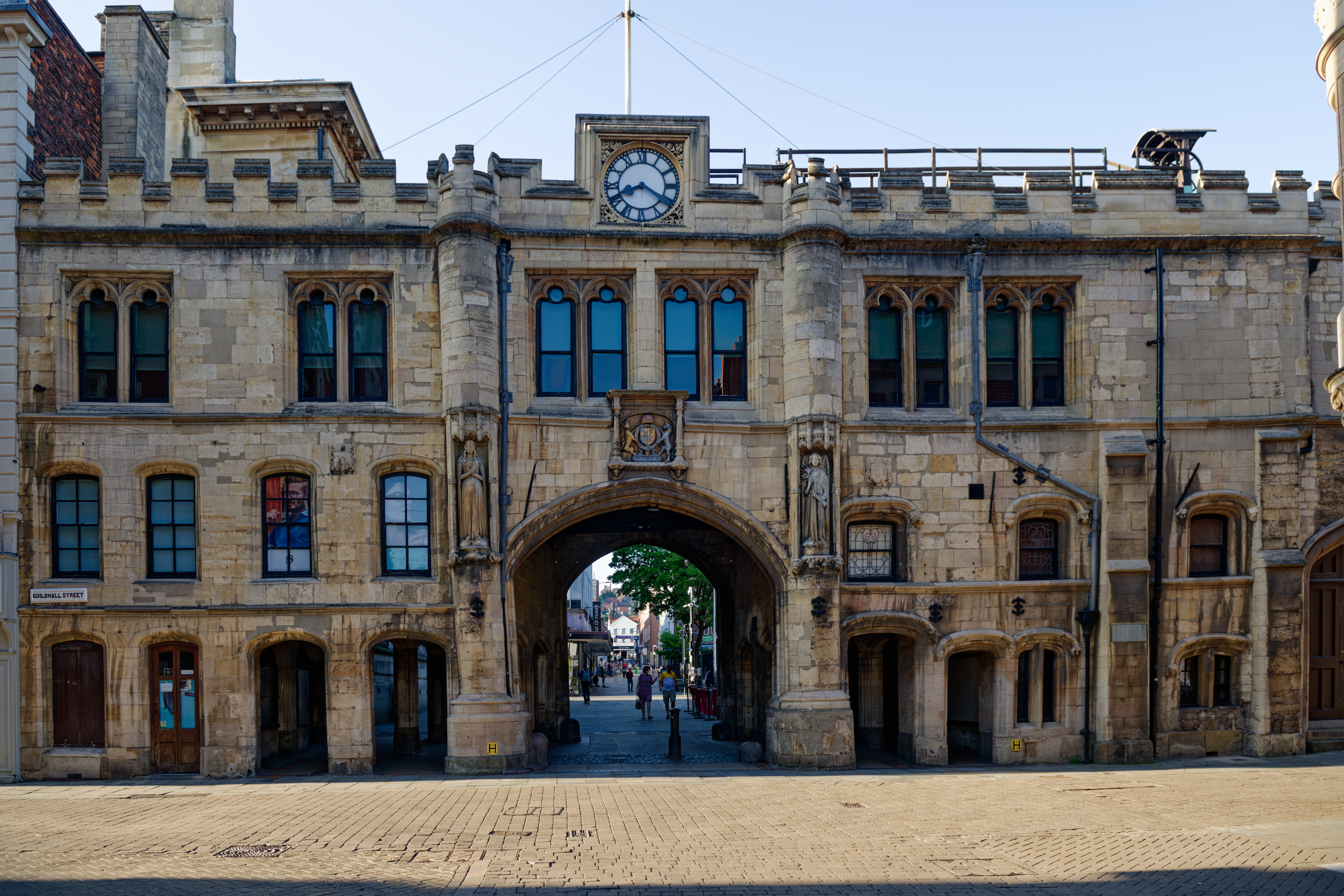
- A view of the Guildhall and Stonebow

- Location within Lincolnshire
- 53.2292°N 0.5405°W
- Location: Lincoln, Lincolnshire

History
- Built: 1520

Listed Building – Grade I
- Designated: 8 October 1953
- Reference no.: 1388605

The Guildhall and Stonebow, Lincoln, has been the meeting place of Lincoln City Council from medieval times to the present. The term Stonebow, which is derived from the Danish word stennibogi, indicates a stone archway that visitors entering the city from the south, along the High Street, would have passed through. It is a Grade I listed building.

The current buildings are in Tudor architecture, completed in 1520, with a Victorian extension of the 1840s in matching style.

== History ==
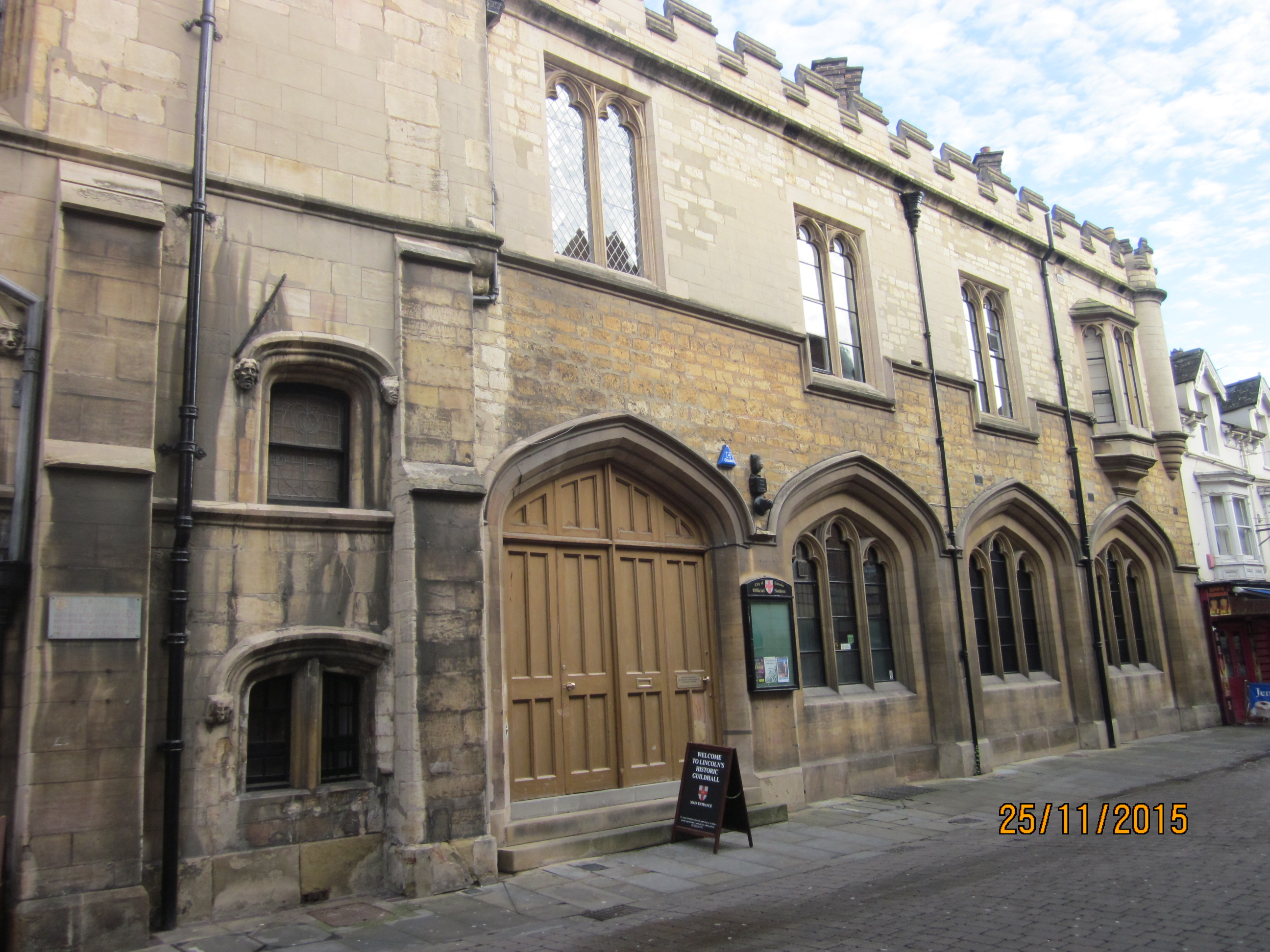
Stonebow, Lincoln. Extension built c. 1844 by W. A. Nicholson containing the Mayor's Parlour

The first gateway on the site, which formed the southern gateway to the City on Lincoln on Ermine Street, the main road from London to York, was completed in the early 211 AD. The gateway would have become known as the Stonebow, which is derived from the Danish word stennibogi, some time after the Viking invasion of England in the late 8th century. The Guildhall, which had been located in the south east corner of the city, was moved to a new location over the Stonebow in 1237. In 1386 King Richard II presented a sword to city officials who ensured that it was displayed in the building. The Guildhall and Stonebow were demolished in the late 14th century but, due to a shortage of funds, the present building was only completed around 1520.

Sometime about 1840 the Lincoln architect W. A. Nicholson made extensive alterations to the east end of the Stonebow, when the building that housed the old City prison was pulled down. Nicholson observed that the Roman wall of the Lower Colonia in Lincoln was to the north of the Stonebow and was still standing to the height of about 15 feet. This suggests that the Stonebow was a barbican, that had been built forward of the Roman southern gateway. Nicholson appears to have been the architect responsible for the present building to the east of the Stonebow completed about 1844 which now contains the Mayor's Parlour and the display of civic regalia.

Further alterations took place 1885–90 by the architect J. L. Pearson, who was responsible for alterations on the west side of the Stonebow. Pearson created an additional passageway arch and the shop units under the arch. In connection with the alterations Potts of Leeds provided a new clock in 1889 with two dials (one facing north, the other south).

The Guildhall, which is on the first floor of the building and which remains the meeting place of Lincoln City Council, won the "Best Story Told Award" from Visit England in 2019.

Lincoln City Hall, a 20th-century building on Orchard Street, provides further accommodation for the city council.

== Architecture ==
The Stonebow is built from the local limestone. The exterior has crenellated parapets on both sides. South front has a roll moulded segmental central arch flanked by single round buttresses with canopied niches containing figures. Above, a tablet with pilaster surround with the arms of James I, and above again, two two-light mullioned windows. Over them, there is a stepped gable containing a clock. On either side of the main arch there are two walkway arches, those to the right original, with hoodmoulds.

The North side has a plainer central arch, flanked by a single walkway arch to left and two to the right. Over the inner archways, small two-light windows. Above, three two-light pointed arched windows and parapet gable with clock.

== Interior ==
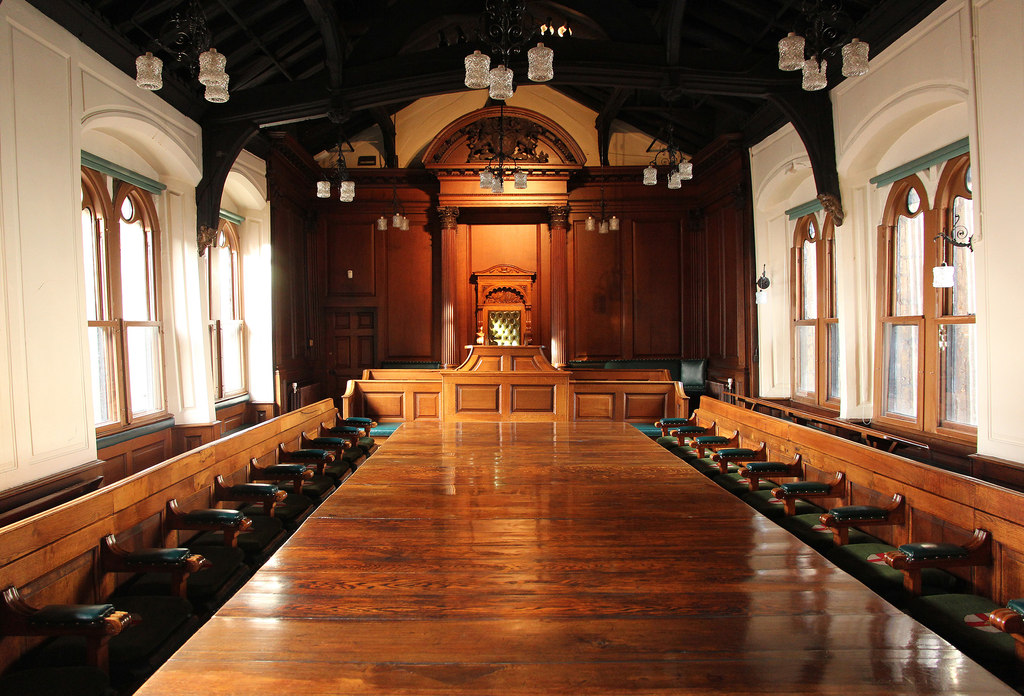
City Council Chamber

The interior of the guildhall has the council chamber on the first floor, which has a strutted king post roof with arch braces to the purlins in the outer bays. The tie beams have bosses. There is mid-18th century panelling with the coat of arms of George II, which is set behind the Mayor's chair, below a segmental pediment on Corinthian columns. Possibly the most impressive feature is the wide table around which the councillors sit. As the size of the council has been increased in recent years, additional seating has had to be added at the east end. The council is summoned to its meeting by the motte bell which dates from the 14th century.

== Gallery ==
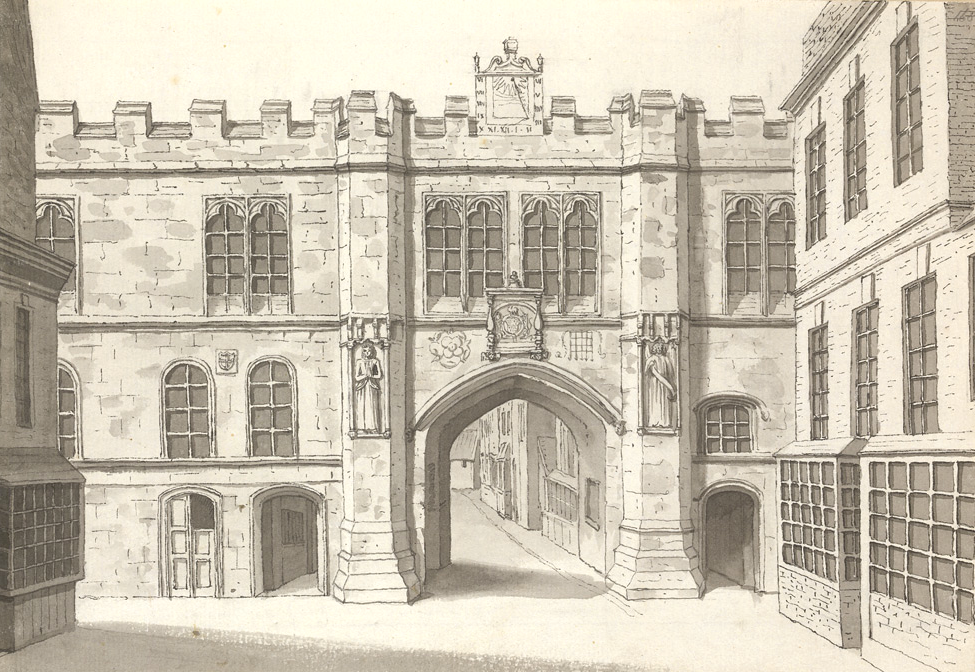
Stonebow, Lincoln from south, c. 1784

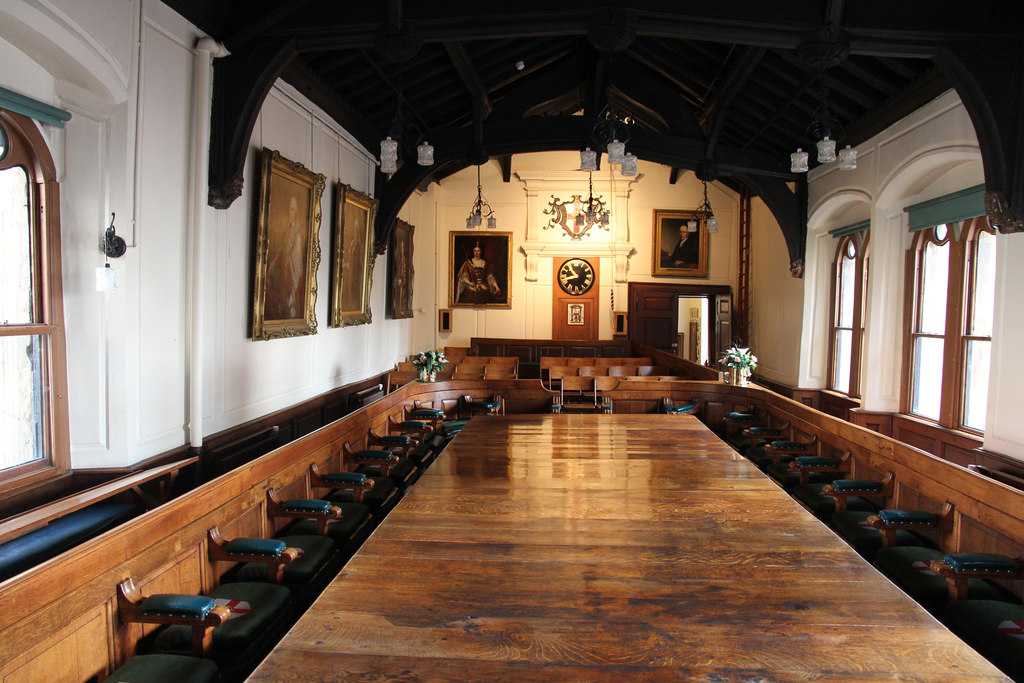
City Council Chamber, other end

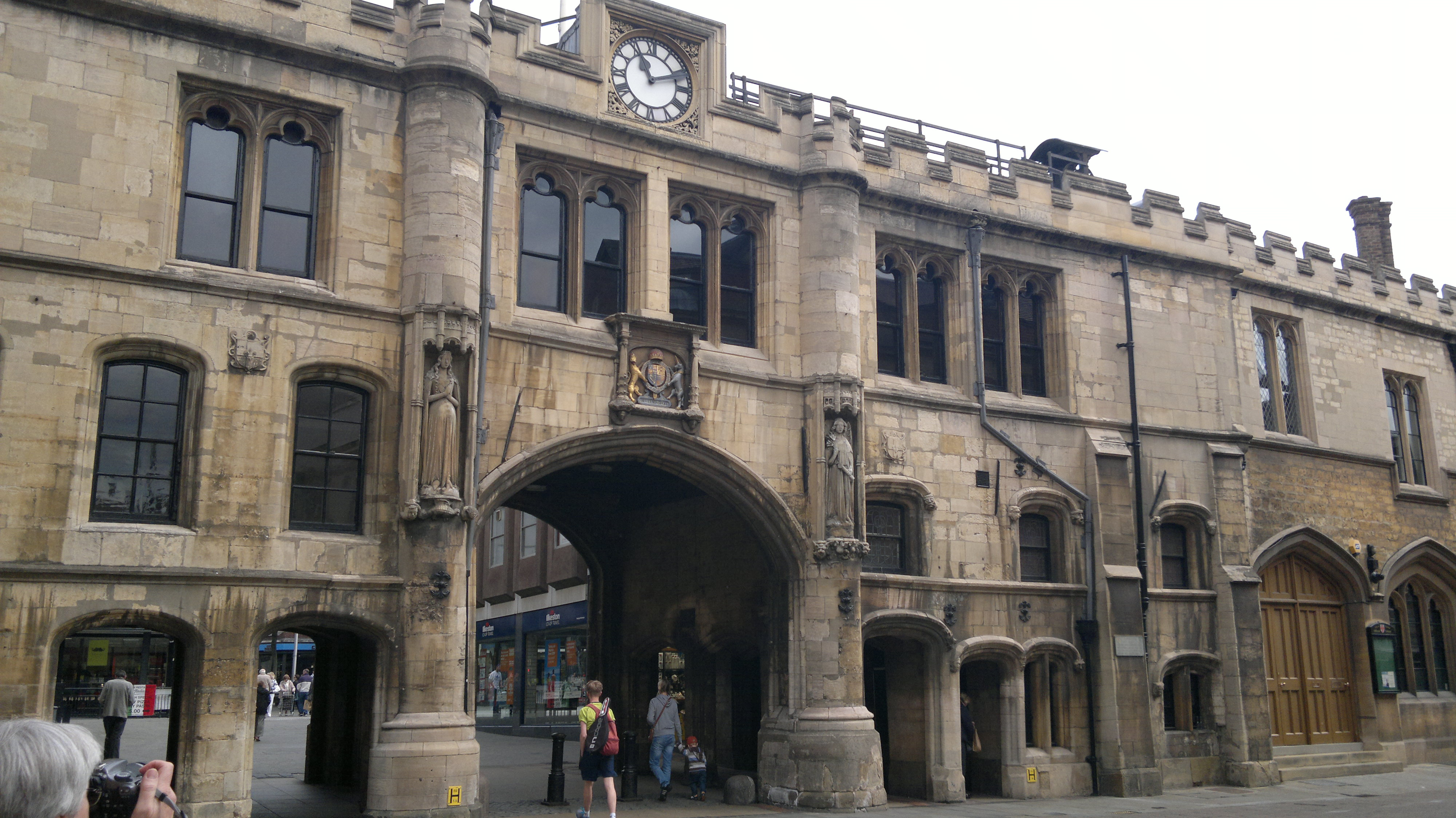
Stonebow and Guildhall, with Mayor's Parlour to left

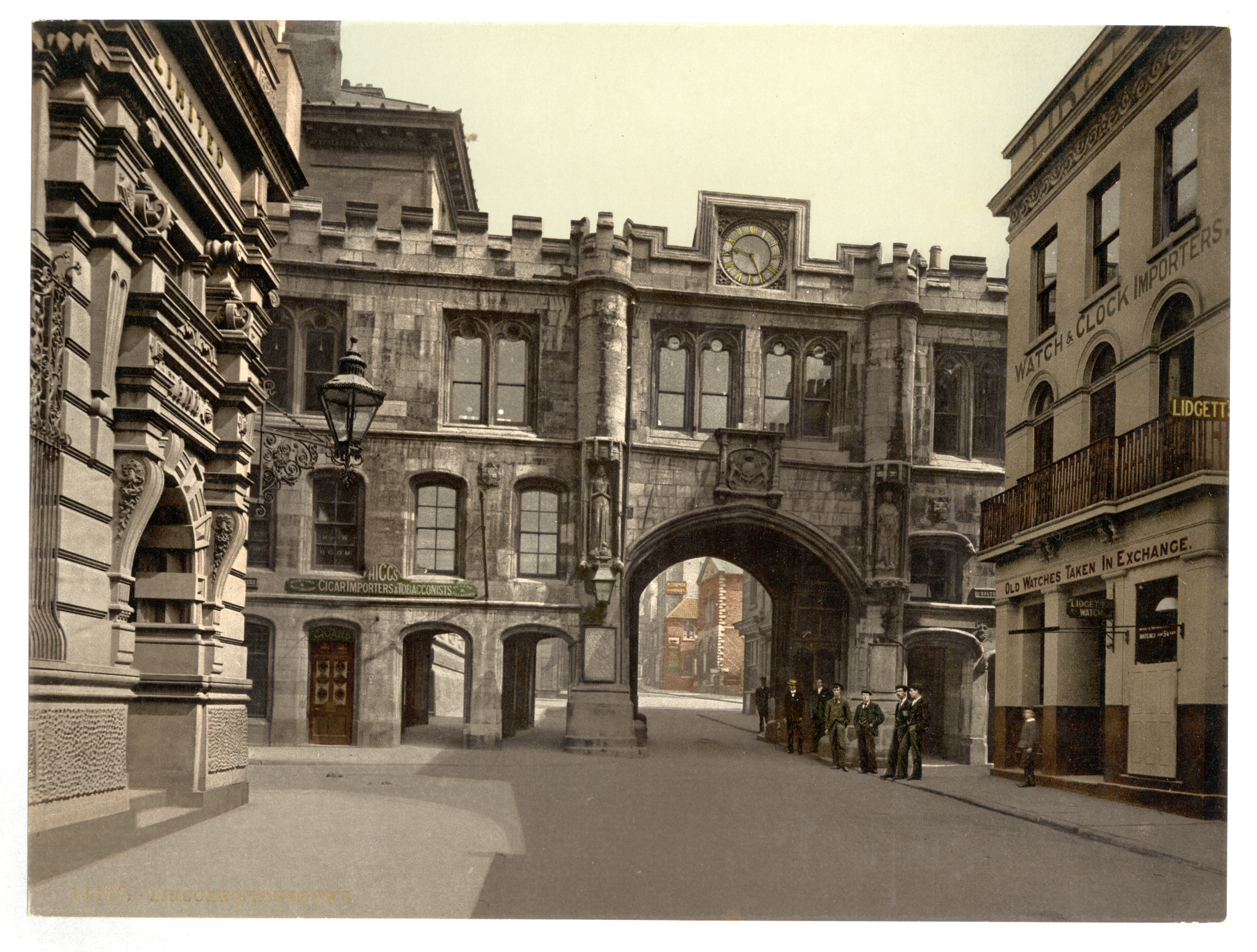
Stonebow, Lincoln, c. 1890

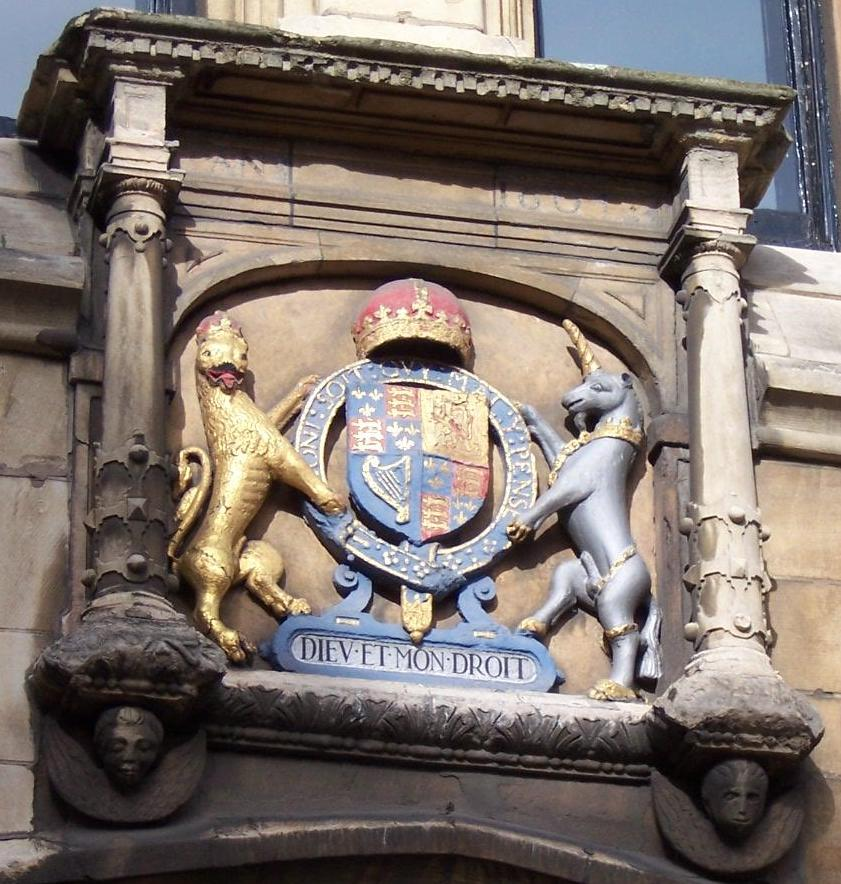
Lincoln Guildhall coat of arms

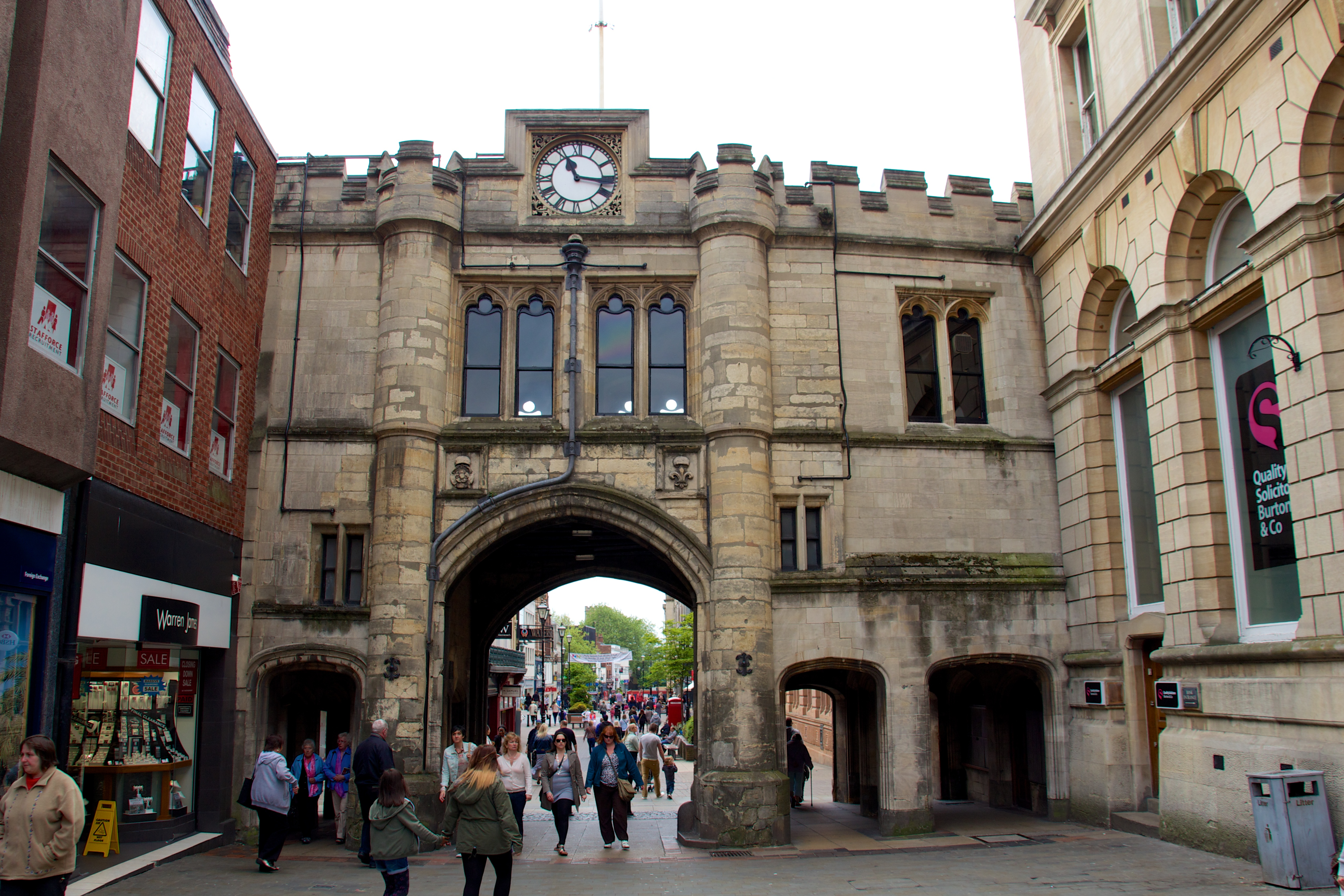
Guildhall and Stonebow, north side

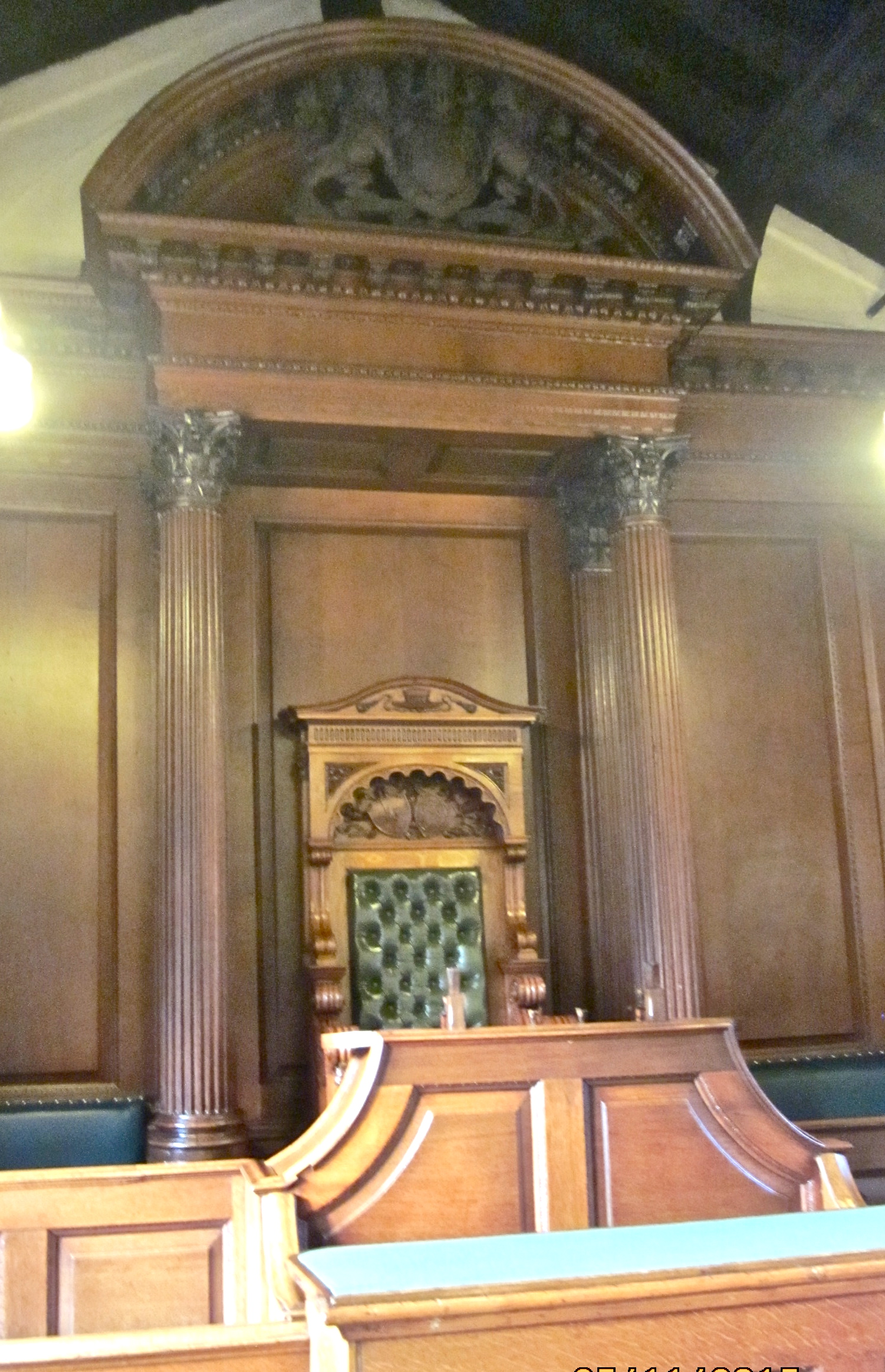
Stonebow, Lincoln. Mayor's chair with canopy and arms of George II

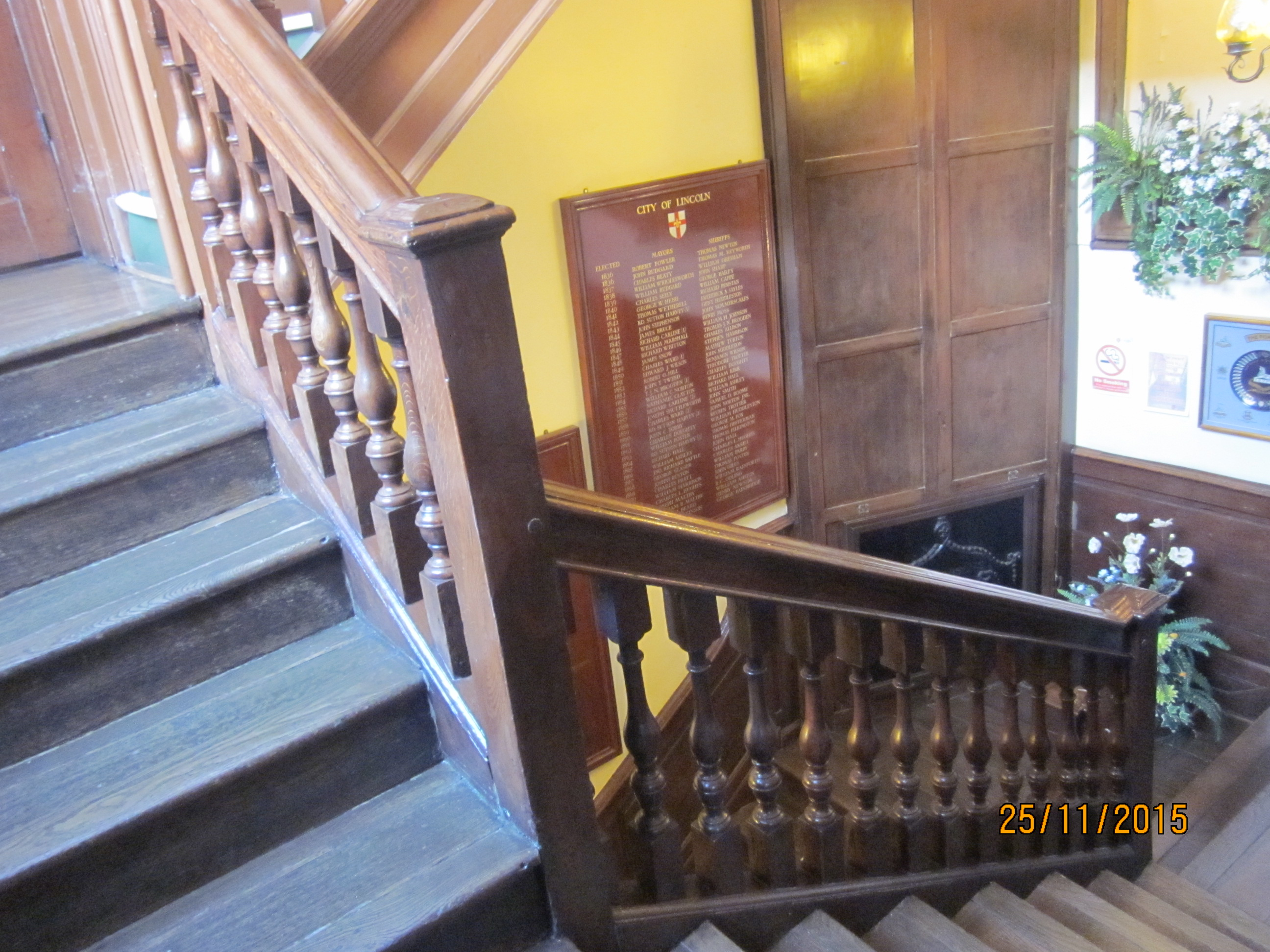
Stonebow, Lincoln. Early 18th century staircase leading to the Council Chamber

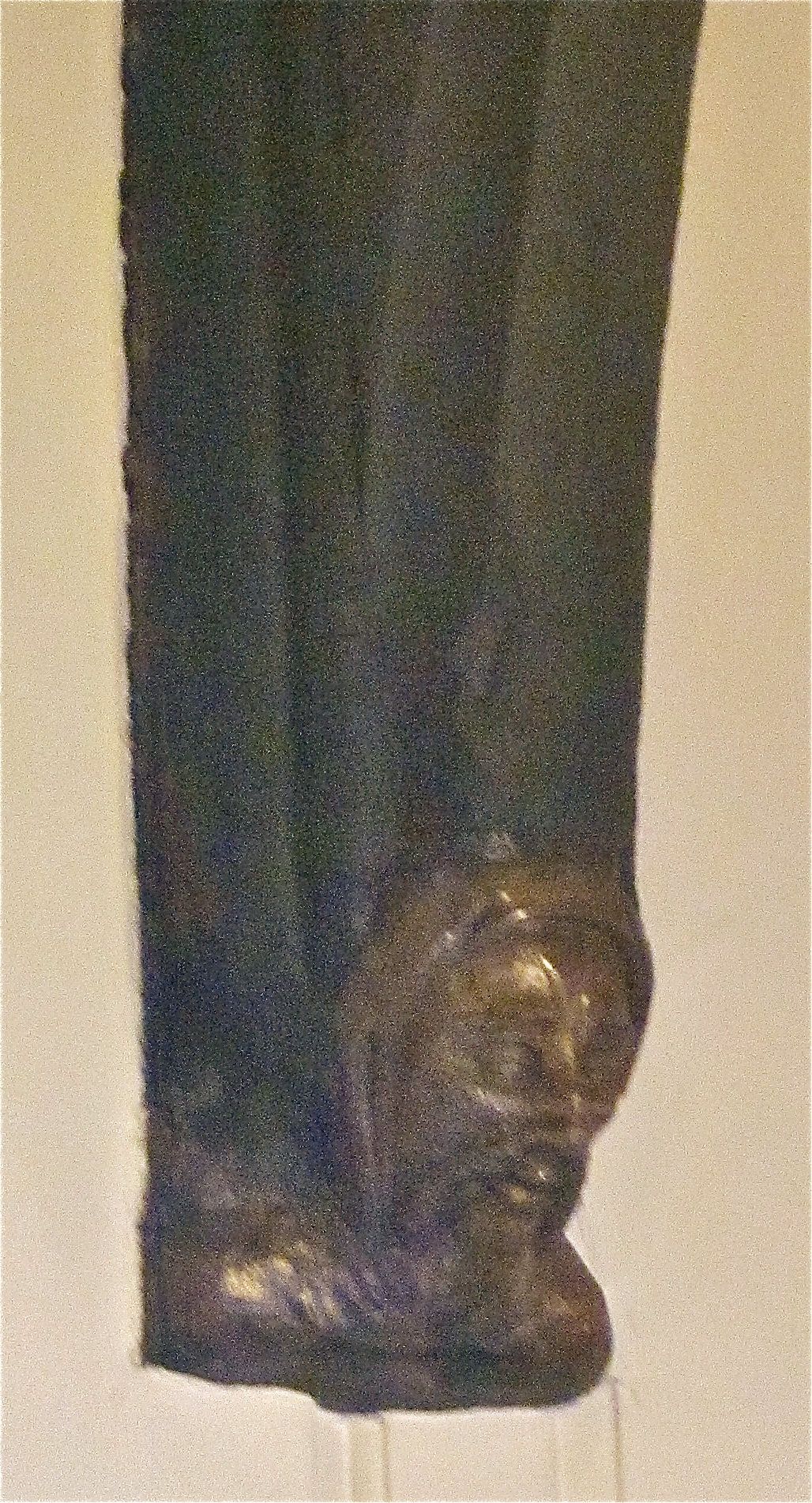
Stonebow, Lincoln. Medieval carved corbel on roof truss in Council Chamber

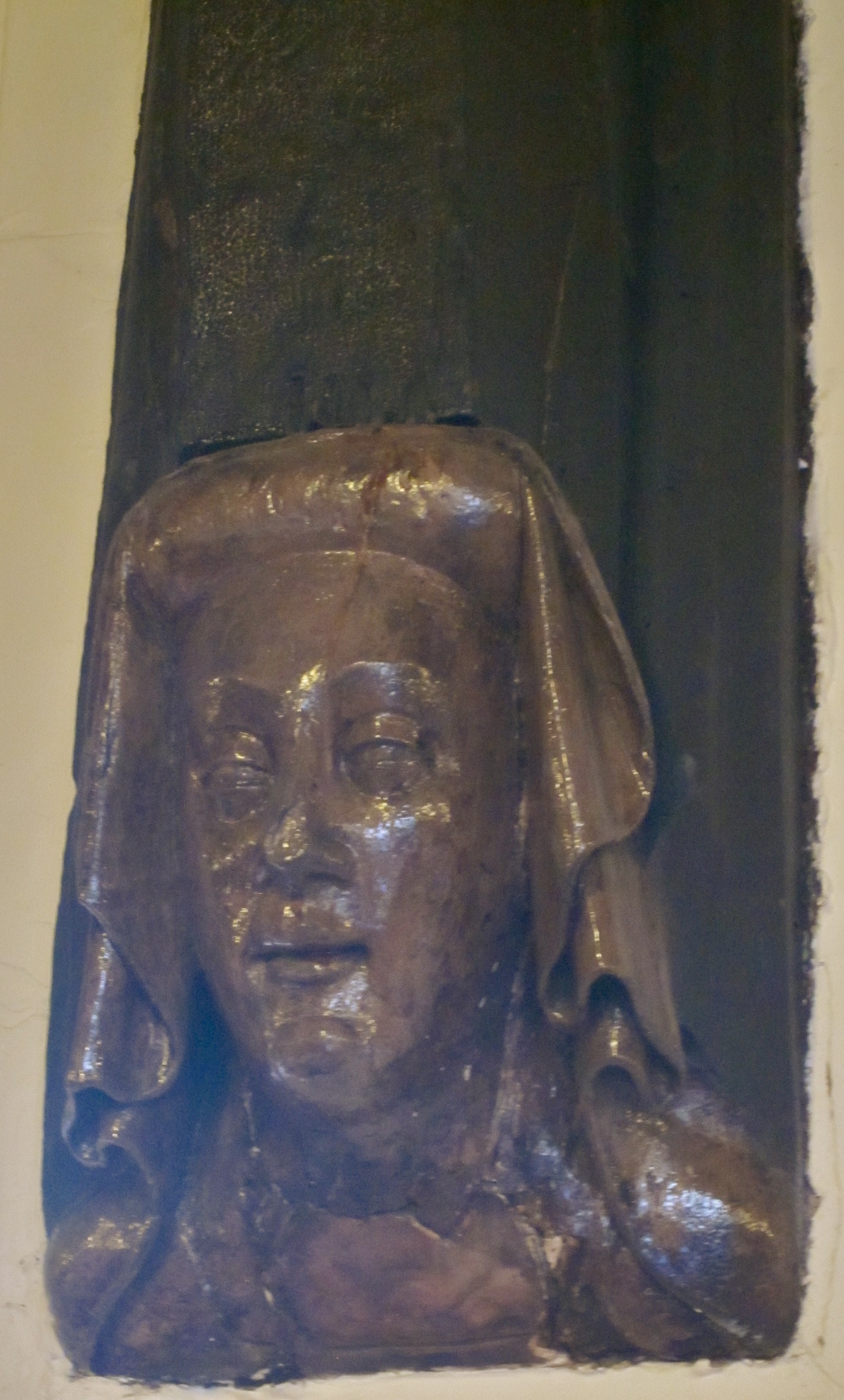
Stonebow, Lincoln. Medieval carved corbel on roof truss in Council Chamber

== Sources ==
- Antram, N.; Pevsner, N.; J., Harris (1989). The Buildings of England: Lincolnshire. Yale University Press. ISBN 978-0300096200.
- Hill, J. W. F. (1955). Georgian Lincoln. Cambridge University Press.
- Nicholson, W. A. (1842). The Advantage of Recording the Discovery of Local Antiquities" in A selection of Papers relative to the County of Lincoln read before the Lincolnshire Topographical Society. pp. 89–90.
- Stoker D.A.( ) The Lincoln Stonebow and the Flattery of Princes Journal of the British Archaeological Association. Vol 150, pp 96–105.
