= Lincoln City Hall =

Municipal building in Lincoln, Lincolnshire, England

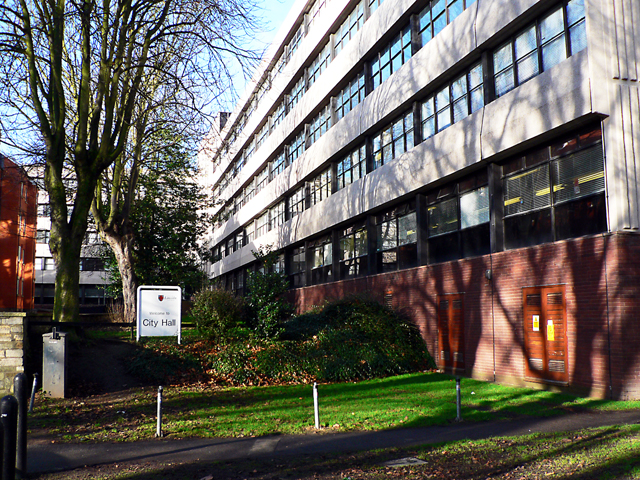
- A view of the City Hall

- Shown in Lincolnshire
- 53.2310°N 0.5437°W
- Location: Beaumont Fee, Lincoln

History
- Built: 1973

Site notes
- Architect: John Roberts Associates
- Architectural style: Brutalist style

City Hall is a municipal structure on Beaumont Fee, Lincoln, Lincolnshire, England. The structure is currently used as the headquarters of the City of Lincoln Council.

== History ==
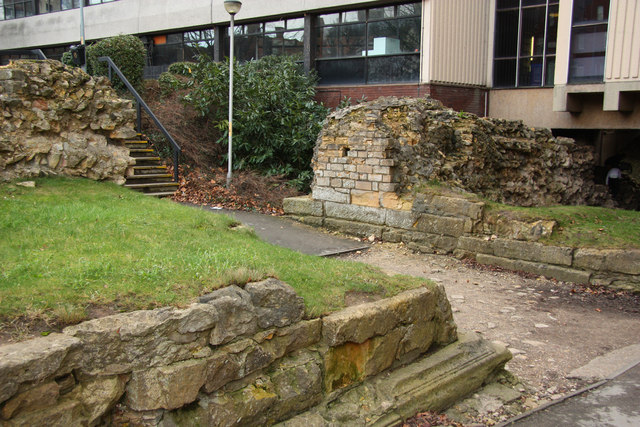
The Roman remains beneath the building

The first municipal building in Lincoln was the guildhall which, in its present incarnation in Saltergate, was completed in 1520. The council outgrew the limited office space at the guildhall and from the 1890s had its main offices in a nearby building called Corporation Offices on Silver Street, with the guildhall thereafter being used for meetings and the mayor's parlour.

The current building between Beaumont Fee and Orchard Street was commissioned as a speculative office block. The site was occupied by the Roman Lower West Gate and the planning authority required that the remains be preserved and protected underneath the new building.

The new building was designed by John Roberts Associates in the Brutalist style, built in concrete and glass and was completed in spring 1973. The design involved a main frontage of 14 bays facing Orchard Street with another long wing extending eastwards behind the left-hand end of the Orchard Street elevation. The main frontage was faced with alternating bands of concrete and dark-framed windows. The fifth and sixth bays from the left featured deeply recessed openings on the ground floor with a glass balcony above bearing the city coat of arms. The design was strongly criticised by the architectural historian, Nikolaus Pevsner, who said it had "absolutely nothing to recommend it ... it offends the Lincoln skyline and is an insult to the civic pride befitting the seat of local government."

The increasing responsibilities of the council meant that, by the early 1970s, some of its functions were being carried out at remote locations and there was pressure to collocate all departments under one roof. The council therefore acquired the Beaumont Fee building to replace the corporation offices on Silver Street and other outlying departments. Full council meetings continued to be held in the guildhall. The building was formally opened as the council's headquarters on 16 March 1974. The corporation offices were subsequently demolished and the Stonebow shopping centre built on the site.

In February 2015, it was announced that the Orchard Street wing would be leased to the Department for Work and Pensions so that the local job centre could move into the building so forming a "public sector hub". The works, which were undertaken at a cost of £1.4 million, were completed and the wing re-opened in January 2016.
