= 2026 City of Lincoln Council election =

2026 English local election

- 7 May 2026

11 out of 33 seats to City of Lincoln Council 17 seats needed for a majority
- Registered: 64,705
- Turnout: 23,763; 36.7%
	First party	Second party	Third party
Leader	Naomi Tweddle	Clare Smalley
Party	Labour	Liberal Democrats	Reform
Last election	23 seats, 45.0%	5 seats, 18.2%	0 seats, 8.1%
Seats before	20	6	0
Seats won	4	2	4
Seats after	17	7	4
Seat change	▼3	▲1	▲4
Popular vote	5,472	3,186	7,237
Percentage	23.1%	13.4%	30.5%
Swing	▼21.9%	▼4.8%	▲22.4%
	Fourth party	Fifth party	Sixth party
Leader	Thomas Dyer
Party	Conservative	Independent	Green
Last election	5 seats, 21.1%	Did not stand	0 seats, 5.4%
Seats before	5	2	0
Seats won	0	0	1
Seats after	2	2	1
Seat change	▼3	Steady	▲1
Popular vote	3,069	Did not stand	4,418
Percentage	12.9%	Did not stand	18.6%
Swing	▼8.2%	N/A	▲13.2%
- Winner of each seat at the 2026 City of Lincoln Council election.
Leader before election
Naomi Tweddle
Labour
Leader after election
Naomi Tweddle
Labour

The 2026 City of Lincoln Council election took place on 7 May 2026 to elect members of City of Lincoln Council in Lincolnshire, England. This was on the same day as other local elections.

Labour retained overall control of the council at this election, but their majority was reduced to just one seat.

== Summary ==
=== Council composition ===
After 2024 election		Before 2026 election	
Party	Seats	Party	Seats
Labour	23	Labour	20
Liberal Democrats	5	Liberal Democrats	6
Conservative	5	Conservative	5
Independent	0	Independent	2

Changes 2024–2026:

- January 2025: Sue Burke (Labour) dies – by-election held April 2025
- April 2025: Sarah Uldall (Liberal Democrats) gains by-election from Labour
- February 2026: Biff Bean (Labour) leaves party to sit as an independent
- February 2026: Neil Murray (Labour) leaves party to sit as an independent

== Incumbents ==
Ward	Incumbent councillor	Party	Re-standing
Abbey	Martin Christopher	Liberal Democrats	Yes
Birchwood	Alan Briggs	Conservative	Yes
Boultham	Gary Hewson	Labour	No
Carholme	Emily Wood	Labour	No
Castle	Loraine Woolley	Labour	No
Glebe	Pat Vaughan	Labour	No
Hartsholme	Rachel Storer	Conservative	No
Minster	Joshua Wells	Labour	Yes
Moorland	Adrianna McNulty	Labour	No
Park	Debbie Armiger	Labour	No
Witham	Hilton Spratt	Conservative	No

== Election result ==
Council composition after the 2024 election

Council composition after the 2026 election

2026 City of Lincoln Council election
Party	This election				Full council			This election		
Party	Candidates	Seats	Net	Seats %	Other	Total	Total %	Votes	Votes %	+/−
Labour	{{{candidates}}}	4	▼3	36.4	13	17	51.5	5,472	23.1	–21.9
Liberal Democrats	{{{candidates}}}	2	▲1	18.18	5	7	21.2	3,186	13.4	–4.8
Reform	{{{candidates}}}	4	▲4	36.4	0	4	12.1	7,237	30.5	+22.4
Conservative	{{{candidates}}}	0	▼3	0.0	2	2	6.1	3,069	12.9	–8.2
Independent	{{{candidates}}}	0	Steady	0.0	2	2	6.1	N/A (Note: Did not stand candidates.)	N/A	N/A
Green	{{{candidates}}}	1	▲1	9.1	0	1	3.0	4,418	18.6	+13.2
Lincolnshire Independent	{{{candidates}}}	0	Steady	0.0	0	0	0.0	267	1.1	+0.3
TUSC	{{{candidates}}}	0	Steady	0.0	0	0	0.0	48	0.2	–0.2
Liberal	{{{candidates}}}	0	Steady	0.0	0	0	0.0	20	0.1	±0.0

== Ward results ==
=== Abbey ===
Abbey
Party	Candidate	Votes	%	±%
Liberal Democrats	Martin Christopher*	897	38.5	−14.0
Green	Elicia Boni	428	18.4	+13.3
Reform	Brian Haughton	403	17.3	+11.8
Labour	Deborah Fisher	301	12.9	−18.6
Lincolnshire Independent	Roger Smith	182	7.8	N/A
Conservative	Alex Sayer	117	5.0	−0.5
Majority		469	20.1	−14.5
Rejected ballots		5	0.2	N/A
Turnout		2,333	36.7	+4.5
Registered electors		6,361		
Liberal Democrats hold		Swing	▼13.7	

=== Birchwood ===
Birchwood
Party	Candidate	Votes	%	±%
Reform	Jamie Cave	752	38.4	+26.8
Conservative	Alan Briggs*	488	24.9	−12.9
Labour Co-op	Amanda Spalding	337	17.2	−26.6
Green	Belle Raynolds	285	14.6	N/A
Liberal Democrats	Paul Akomeah-Osei	94	4.8	−2.1
Majority		264	13.5	N/A
Rejected ballots		0	0.0	N/A
Turnout		1,956	32.8	+7.0
Registered electors		5,957		
Reform gain from Conservative		Swing	▲19.9	

=== Boultham ===
Boultham
Party	Candidate	Votes	%	±%
Labour	Andrew Currie	623	29.7	−25.7
Reform	Stephen Ledgeway	582	27.8	+17.1
Green	Charles Rodgers	528	25.2	+17.2
Conservative	Oliver Morgan	198	9.4	−7.9
Liberal Democrats	Debbie Grant	165	7.9	−0.6
Majority		41	0.9	−22.8
Rejected ballots		4	0.2	N/A
Turnout		2,100	39.3	+11.0
Registered electors		5,350		
Labour hold		Swing	▼21.4	

=== Carholme ===
Carholme
Party	Candidate	Votes	%	±%
Labour Co-op	Lesley Allinson	889	36.0	−20.3
Green	Josh Parkinson	779	31.6	+26.1
Reform	Robert Cross	447	18.1	N/A
Conservative	Charlie Rogers	167	6.8	−0.7
Liberal Democrats	Ross Pepper	117	4.7	−14.7
TUSC	Nick Parker	48	1.9	−2.0
Liberal	Tinashe Chipawe	20	0.8	N/A
Majority		110	4.4	–32.5
Rejected ballots		9	0.4	N/A
Turnout		2,476	43.4	+9.1
Registered electors		5,710		
Labour Co-op hold		Swing	▼23.2	

=== Castle ===
Castle
Party	Candidate	Votes	%	±%
Labour	Helena Mair	768	35.3	−24.6
Reform	Mabon Melbourne	635	29.2	+20.5
Green	Katie Rudd	491	22.6	+13.2
Conservative	Mazyar Khidir	155	7.1	−7.1
Liberal Democrats	Joshue Connor	128	5.9	−0.1
Majority		133	6.1	–39.6
Rejected ballots		6	0.3	N/A
Turnout		2,183	39.8	+11.6
Registered electors		5,480		
Labour hold		Swing	▼22.6	

=== Glebe ===
Glebe
Party	Candidate	Votes	%	±%
Liberal Democrats	Darrell Harding	764	37.1	−14.6
Reform	Gareth Shields	634	30.8	+21.4
Labour Co-op	Debbie Armiger	292	14.2	−14.3
Green	Matty Stevens	209	10.2	N/A
Conservative	William Hunter	160	7.8	−2.6
Majority		130	6.3	N/A
Rejected ballots		2	0.1	N/A
Turnout		2,061	35.0	+5.9
Registered electors		5,885		
Liberal Democrats gain from Labour		Swing	▼18.0	

=== Hartsholme ===
Hartsholme
Party	Candidate	Votes	%	±%
Reform	Stuart Grantham	1,007	40.3	+30.6
Conservative	Victoria Brooks	549	22.0	−13.3
Labour	Lisa Pocklington	424	17.0	−26.3
Green	Adrian Barrett	340	13.6	+8.5
Liberal Democrats	Jim Charters	178	7.1	+0.5
Majority		458	18.3	N/A
Rejected ballots		3	0.1	N/A
Turnout		2,501	39.4	+7.9
Registered electors		6,350		
Reform gain from Conservative		Swing	▲22.0	

=== Minster ===
Minster
Party	Candidate	Votes	%	±%
Labour	Joshua Wells*	811	36.6	−12.6
Reform	Elizabeth Hughes	716	32.3	+24.5
Conservative	Vasco Pinto	305	13.8	−13.7
Green	Emils Lacis	250	11.3	+5.9
Liberal Democrats	Aidan Turner	133	6.0	+0.9
Majority		95	4.3	–17.4
Rejected ballots		4	0.2	N/A
Turnout		2,219	40.5	+9.0
Registered electors		5,474		
Labour hold		Swing	▼18.6	

=== Moorland ===
Moorland
Party	Candidate	Votes	%	±%
Reform	Liam Kelly	782	44.2	+33.6
Labour Co-op	Funmi Adeyemi	327	18.5	−27.0
Conservative	Matthew Fido	305	17.2	−15.5
Green	Seamus Murray	262	14.8	+8.0
Liberal Democrats	Joshua Spires	93	5.3	+0.9
Majority		455	25.7	N/A
Rejected ballots		5	0.3	N/A
Turnout		1,774	31.3	+4.8
Registered electors		5,676		
Reform gain from Labour		Swing	▲30.3	

=== Park ===
Park
Party	Candidate	Votes	%	±%
Green	Sally Horscroft	568	30.3	+20.0
Liberal Democrats	Ryan Campbell	425	22.7	−0.7
Reform	Craig Rhodes	416	22.2	+16.0
Labour	Harriet Conway	302	16.1	−31.1
Lincolnshire Independent	Turon Miah	85	4.5	N/A
Conservative	Thomas Hulme	80	4.3	−2.9
Majority		143	7.6	N/A
Rejected ballots		2	0.1	N/A
Turnout		1,878	28.8	+5.4
Registered electors		6,529		
Green gain from Labour		Swing	▲10.4	

=== Witham ===
Witham
Party	Candidate	Votes	%	±%
Reform	James Bean	863	37.9	+27.2
Conservative	Josh Allen	545	23.9	−15.7
Labour	Bill Bilton	398	17.5	−21.2
Green	Lynda Skipper	278	12.2	+7.2
Liberal Democrats	Sharon Osborne	192	8.4	+2.4
Majority		318	14.0	N/A
Rejected ballots		6	0.3	N/A
Turnout		2,282	38.5	+10.2
Registered electors		5,933		
Reform gain from Conservative		Swing	▲21.5	
