= 2018 City of Lincoln Council election =

2018 UK local government election

← 2016	3 May 2018	2019 →

11 of the 33 seats to City of Lincoln Council 17 seats needed for a majority
- Turnout: 31.27%
	First party	Second party
Party	Labour	Conservative
Last election	27	6
Seats won	7	4
Seats after	24	9
Seat change	▼3	▲3
Popular vote	8,944	6,873
Percentage	47.9%	36.8%
- Map showing the results of the 2018 Lincoln City Council elections by ward. Red shows Labour seats and blue shows the Conservatives.
Council control before election
Labour
Council control after election
Labour

The 2018 City of Lincoln Council election took place on 3 May 2018 to elect members of City of Lincoln Council in England. This was held on the same day as other local elections. One third of 33 seats were up for election, with one councillor in each of the 11 wards being elected. As the previous election in 2016 had been an all-out election with new ward boundaries, the seats of the candidates that had finished third in each ward in 2016 were up for election.

== Overall results ==
2018 City of Lincoln Council Election Result
Party	Seats	Gains	Losses	Net gain/loss	Seats %	Votes %	Votes	+/−
Labour	7	0	3	▼3	63.6	47.9	8,944	
Conservative	4	3	0	▲3	36.4	36.8	6,873	
Liberal Democrats	0	0	0	Steady	0.0	7.6	1,420	
Green	0	0	0	Steady	0.0	5.6	1,044	
UKIP	0	0	0	Steady	0.0	1.3	247	
Independent	0	0	0	Steady	0.0	0.8	154	

== Ward results ==
=== Abbey ===
Location of Abbey ward

Abbey
Party	Candidate	Votes	%
Labour	Bill Bilton	850	52.0
Conservative	Richard Butroid	348	21.3
Liberal Democrats	Clare Smalley	311	19.0
Green	Edward Evelyn Francis	126	7.7
Majority		502	30.7
Turnout		1,635	
Labour hold			

=== Birchwood ===
Location of Birchwood ward

Birchwood
Party	Candidate	Votes	%
Conservative	Alan Briggs	786	47.4
Labour	Paul Gowen	654	39.5
UKIP	Elaine Warde	100	6.0
Liberal Democrats	Adam Carnie	68	4.1
Green	Benjamin Loryman	49	3.0
Majority		132	8.0
Turnout		1,657	28
Conservative gain from Labour			

=== Boultham ===
Location of Boultham ward

Boultham
Party	Candidate	Votes	%
Labour	Gary Hewson	848	58.8
Conservative	Simon Pouncey	453	31.4
Green	Simon Tooke	71	4.9
Liberal Democrats	Kian Hearnshaw	69	4.8
Majority		395	27.4
Turnout		1,441	31
Labour hold			

=== Carholme ===
Location of Carholme ward

Carholme
Party	Candidate	Votes	%
Labour	Laura Angela McWilliams	1,008	53.1
Liberal Democrats	James Brown	451	23.8
Conservative	Katya Salvador	293	15.4
Green	Nicola Watson	99	5.2
UKIP	Andrew Dunn	47	2.5
Majority		557	29.3
Turnout		1,898	38
Labour hold			

=== Castle ===
Location of Castle ward

Castle
Party	Candidate	Votes	%
Labour	Loraine Woolley	894	54.4
Conservative	Tom Roche	553	33.6
Green	Lynne Allison	119	7.2
Liberal Democrats	Diana Catton	78	4.7
Majority		341	20.7
Turnout		1,644	31
Labour hold			

=== Glebe ===
Location of Glebe ward

Glebe
Party	Candidate	Votes	%
Labour	Patrick Vaughan	775	50.7
Conservative	Jenine Butroid	574	37.6
Green	Fiona McKenna	115	7.5
Liberal Democrats	Stephen Lonsdale	64	4.2
Majority		201	13.2
Turnout		1,528	26
Labour hold			

=== Hartsholme ===
Location of Hartsholme ward

Hartsholme
Party	Candidate	Votes	%
Conservative	Andrew Kerry	1,031	50.2
Labour	Liz Bushell	783	38.2
Green	John Radford	169	8.2
Liberal Democrats	Jamie Gurden	69	3.4
Majority		248	12.1
Turnout		6,131	32
Conservative hold			

=== Minster ===
Location of Minster ward

Minster
Party	Candidate	Votes	%
Conservative	Christopher Reid	793	43.0
Labour	Rebecca Longbottom	742	40.2
Independent	Liz Maxwell	154	8.4
Liberal Democrats	Nicole Pouncey	92	5.0
Green	Ivan Chafen	63	3.4
Majority		51	2.8
Turnout		1,844	36
Conservative gain from Labour			

=== Moorland ===
Location of Moorland ward

Moorland
Party	Candidate	Votes	%
Labour	Adrianna McNulty	785	50.9
Conservative	Sharon Longthorne	644	41.8
Liberal Democrats	Ross Pepper	59	3.8
Green	Christopher Padley	54	3.5
Majority		141	9.1
Turnout		1,542	28
Labour hold			

=== Park ===
Location of Park ward

Park
Party	Candidate	Votes	%
Labour	Helena Mair	819	59.7
Conservative	Oliver Peeke	271	19.8
Green	Sally Horscroft	110	8.0
UKIP	Tony Todd	100	7.3
Liberal Democrats	Natasha Chapman	72	5.2
Majority		548	39.9
Turnout		1,372	20
Labour hold			

=== Witham ===
Location of Witham ward

Witham
Party	Candidate	Votes	%
Conservative	Hilton Spratt	1,127	54.5
Labour	Jane Loffhagen	786	38.0
Liberal Democrats	George Hill	87	4.2
Green	Michele Servaud	69	3.3
Majority		341	16.5
Turnout		2,069	34
Conservative gain from Labour			
