= St Mary Magdalene Priory, Lincoln =

Monastery in Lincoln, England

Coordinates: 53.2299°N 0.5199°W

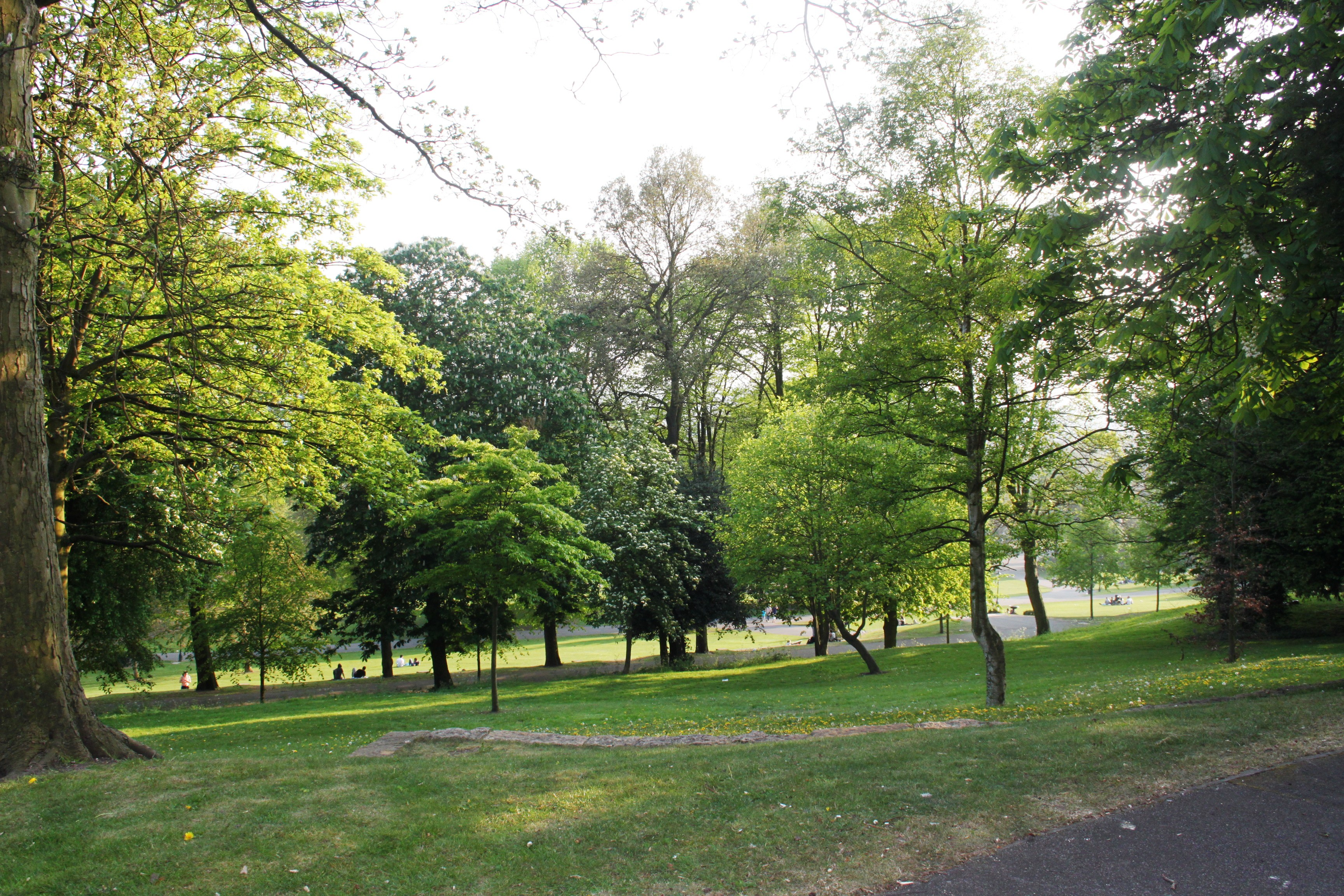
Former Monks' Leys Common, owned by the priory, now part of the Lincoln Arboretum

St Mary Magdalene was a Benedictine priory in Lincoln, England. Along with Sandtoft Priory and Hanes Cell, it was a Lincolnshire cell of St Mary's Abbey in York, England. A surviving building, once owned by the priory, is Monks' Abbey, Lincoln.

== Early priory history ==
A 'tradition', starting with associations made by John Leland in his 16th century Itineraries, was that the 7th century Icanho (or Icanhoc, or Ycanno) monastery, mentioned by Bede, and said to have been destroyed by the invading Danes, was owned by the priory. However, John Blair, in the Oxford Dictionary of National Biography entry for Botwulf of Thorney, the saint who is said to have founded the monastery in 654, writes that Icanho has been 'conclusively identified' with Iken in Suffolk.

Leland also mentions another early religious house in Lincoln, that predates the time of Remigius de Fécamp, the Benedictine Bishop who began the construction of Lincoln Cathedral in the mid 1070s. He writes:

"Where the Deane of Lyncolne's house is in the Minstar Close of Lyncolne, and there about, was a Monastery of Nunes afore the time that Remigus began the new Mynstar of Lyncolne: and of this Howse yet remayne certayne tokens of it."

Romfar is said to have given the priory lands in Winterton, Usselby and Osgoodby, Lincolnshire, prior to 1115–18, as well as extensive holdings in Lincoln, including the Monks Abbey site, all of which were confirmed by Henry I in 1120–2.

While no charter for the priory survives, a document relating to an early 15th-century dispute, sets out the terms of the endowment by Romfar. The document describes an existing church dedicated to St Mary, and adjoining lands, in an area of Lincoln called 'les blackmunkes', would be given to the Priory on the condition that at least two monks, acting as chaplains in the Church, would live there and celebrate divine service for the souls of Richard I, Romfar, and his heirs. If the priory did not meet these conditions, or missed for one year, excepting in the case of pestilence in the city, they would forfeit the lands. The York abbot successfully challenged the claim that the priory had not met Romfar's conditions and used the confirmation of the endowment by Henry I to maintain possession.

Other endowments were given to the priory by Roger Mowbray and William, Earl of Warren were confirmed by Henry II.

In addition to meeting the conditions of their endowments, the Priory's role was to manage the Lincolnshire estates held by the mother abbey in York, and, as such, 'was only intended to support a prior and one or two monks'. Despite the small size of the cell, unlike other 'minute dependencies', excavation work at the Monks Abbey site suggests the priory members 'worshipped in a cruciform chapel of good size'.

== St Peter's ==
A gift by 'Picot, son of Colsuan' of '4 acres of land and the church of St Peter, Lincoln' to the priory, may refer to the son of Colsuain Lincolniesis, who died during the earlier reign of Henry I, but this 'is only a conjecture'. This St Peter's church, identified as 'in Baggerholme', or 'at welles', is believed to have stood on a hillside, south of Monks Road, closer to the city centre than Monks Abbey. Spa Close, or Road, Lincoln, is a possible site. A spring in this area, described as being in 'Black Monk's fields' was given a granite well-head, by Charles Mainwairing in 1833, and it was marked on late 19th century ordnance survey maps as 'The Spa (chalybeate)'. Stone steps, to the well, were still visible in 1901.

In another account, by 1428, St Peter's parish, as with other parishes in the area, had less than ten residents, and collapsed, as an administrative and ecclesiastical unit. But, instead of becoming redundant, like the nearby churches of St Bavon and St Rumbold, St Peter's church was 'unusual' in being taken up by the priory of St Mary Magdalene in 1461, who ensured that services were maintained. In asking 'why St Peter's should be treated in this way', the suggestion is that, for reasons unknown, the monks of St Mary Magdalene Priory 'regarded custodianship of the spring, after which the church and parish were named, as an important matter, parishioners or no parishioners and were therefore content to add the management of a round of services here to their responsibilities'. The church's name 'St Peter ad fontem', with fontem meaning spring, may indicate the spring was 'already a focus of some devotion', prior to the establishment of a church there.

== Monks Abbey ==
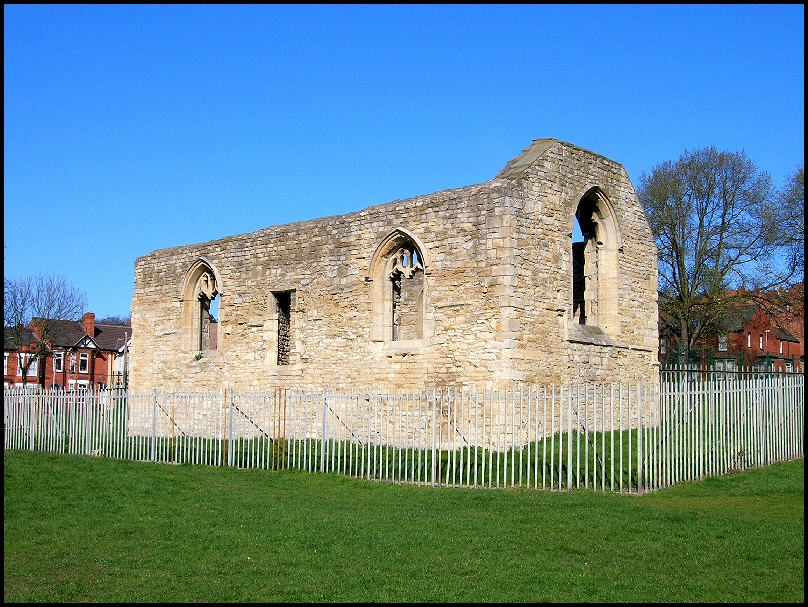
Ruins of Monks Abbey, Monks Road, Lincoln, a surviving property owned by the St Mary Magdalene Priory

The Monks Abbey site is possibly part of the lands belonging to a 4th-century Roman villa, located on Greetwell Road, which was rediscovered during ironstone mining in the late 1800s.

Monks Abbey is located on the River Witham, at the northern end of area known as the Lincoln Stamp End causeway. Early records show that the abbey, or Monks Leys, as it was called, owned 'le stampcause' as part of its estate. There is a pattern with other River Witham causeways, each having similarly located northern churches, and areas of ritual artefact deposit. This placement of early churches, or religious establishments, is thought to be part of a Christian 'conversion and guardianship' of important pagan sites within the Witham valley. Archeological finds on the Lincoln Stamp End causeway mark it as an important ritual site from the Bronze Age through to the medieval era with later deposits suggesting it continued to be used for this purpose throughout the life of the St Mary Magdalene priory cell. The ritual significance, derived from pagan belief, probably focused on water features, including the River Witham itself. Among the finds associated with the causeway, is the 4th century Iron Age Witham Shield, worked in the Celtic La Tène style, which was discovered during construction work on the Stamp End lock in 1826.

== Later history ==
In 1531, Henry VII wrote to the abbot of St Mary's Abbey, York, to complain that the Lincoln priory was a 'mean to provoke liberty and conversation not decent and meet for religious persons'. This began an exchange of correspondence between the King, his adviser, Thomas Cromwell, and the York abbot, which document a slow removal of monks from Lincoln against resistance from within the Benedictine order.

Medieval records refer to a 'Monks' Liberty' in Lincoln, 'which is identical with the land and privileges of the cell of St Mary's York usually known as Monk's Abbey', and identify the abbey's early ownership of 'Monks' Leys Common', now the site of the Lincoln Arboretum. In 1455, the abbot in York, reached an agreement over the common with the Lincoln corporation and, in 1585, following the dissolution of the monasteries, the land passed to the corporation's ownership. The latter decision after John Manners, 4th Earl of Rutland, on 22 September 1585, was asked to rule on whether the land should go to the corporation or the 'Black Monks' (Cistercians), represented by monk Robert Smith.
