= 2016 City of Lincoln Council election =

2016 UK local government election

- 5 May 2016

All 33 seats to City of Lincoln Council 17 seats needed for a majority
- Turnout: 31.27%
	First party	Second party
Party	Labour	Conservative
Last election	26	7
Seats won	27	6
Seat change	▲1	▼1
Popular vote	26,399	16,386
Percentage	50.2%	31.2%
- Map showing the results of the 2016 Lincoln City Council elections by ward. Red shows Labour seats and blue shows the Conservatives. Striped wards indicate wards with mixed representation.
Council control before election
Labour
Council control after election
Labour

The 2016 City of Lincoln Council election took place on 5 May 2016 to elect members of City of Lincoln Council in England. This was held on the same day as other local elections. All 33 seats were up for election, with 3 councillors in each of the 11 wards being elected following a boundary review.

== Overall results ==
2016 City of Lincoln Council Election Result
Party	Seats	Gains	Losses	Net gain/loss	Seats %	Votes %	Votes	+/−
Labour	27	1	0	▲	81.8	50.2	26,399	
Conservative	6	0	1	▼	18.2	31.2	16,386	
UKIP	0	0	0	Steady	0.0	8.0	4,210	
Green	0	0	0	Steady	0.0	5.1	2,700	
Liberal Democrats	0	0	0	Steady	0.0	5.0	2,628	
TUSC	0	0	0	Steady	0.0	0.5	254	

== Ward results ==
=== Abbey ===
Location of Abbey ward

Abbey (3)
Party	Candidate	Votes	%
Labour	Kathleen Brothwell	877	19.3%
Labour	Fay Smith	833	18.3%
Labour	Peter West	790	17.4%
Conservative	Graham Bratby	381	8.4%
Conservative	Douglas Collison	303	6.7%
Conservative	Caleb Harris	286	6.3%
UKIP	Chris Butler	271	6.0%
Green	Kenneth Yates	247	5.4%
Liberal Democrats	Clare Smalley	191	4.2%
Liberal Democrats	Michael Brown	188	4.1%
TUSC	Nick Parker	64	1.4%
TUSC	Gavyn Graham	61	1.3%
TUSC	Jac Green	54	1.2%
Turnout		4,546	
Labour win (new seat)			
Labour win (new seat)			
Labour win (new seat)			

=== Birchwood ===
Location of Birchwood ward

Birchwood (3)
Party	Candidate	Votes	%
Conservative	Edmund Strengiel	703	14.5%
Labour	Rosanne Kirk	682	14.1%
Labour	Paul Gowen	647	13.4%
Conservative	David Denman	644	13.3%
Labour	Tony Gray	618	12.8%
Conservative	Jenine Butroid	498	10.3%
UKIP	Elaine Warde	397	8.2%
UKIP	Tony Wells	383	7.9%
Green	John Radford	167	3.4%
Liberal Democrats	Morgan Aran	107	2.2%
Turnout		4,846	
Conservative win (new seat)			
Labour win (new seat)			
Labour win (new seat)			

=== Boultham ===
Location of Boultham ward

Boultham (3)
Party	Candidate	Votes	%
Labour	Ralph Toofany	778	20.5%
Labour	Gill Clayton-Hewson	764	20.1%
Labour	Gary Hewson	760	20.0%
Conservative	Alan Briggs	393	10.3%
Conservative	Caroline Wilson	312	8.2%
Conservative	Roger Hansard	297	7.8%
UKIP	Hannah Smith	243	6.4%
Liberal Democrats	Heather Cullen	146	3.8%
Liberal Democrats	Ryan Cullen	107	2.8%
Turnout		3,800	
Labour win (new seat)			
Labour win (new seat)			
Labour win (new seat)			

=== Carholme ===
Location of Carholme ward

Carholme (3)
Party	Candidate	Votes	%
Labour	Karen Lee	1,176	22.5%
Labour	Neil Murray	1,076	20.6%
Labour	Tony Speakman	1,029	19.7%
Conservative	Matthew Fido	414	7.9%
Conservative	David Smith	341	6.5%
Conservative	Katya Roures Salvador	311	6.0%
Green	Nicola Watson	293	5.6%
Green	Benjamin Loryman	223	4.3%
Green	Christopher Padley	180	3.4%
Liberal Democrats	Charles Shaw	176	3.4%
Turnout		5,219	
Labour win (new seat)			
Labour win (new seat)			
Labour win (new seat)			

=== Castle ===
Location of Castle ward

Castle (3)
Party	Candidate	Votes	%
Labour	Jim Hanrahan	867	21.0%
Labour	Donald Nannestad	867	21.0%
Labour	Loraine Woolley	853	20.7%
Conservative	Rod Archer	378	9.2%
Conservative	David Wright	370	9.0%
Conservative	Malcolm Barham	318	7.7%
UKIP	David Warde	297	7.2%
Liberal Democrats	Daphne Shaw	179	4.3%
Turnout		4,129	
Labour win (new seat)			
Labour win (new seat)			
Labour win (new seat)			

=== Glebe ===
Location of Glebe ward

Glebe (3)
Party	Candidate	Votes	%
Labour	Ric Metcalfe	841	18.2%
Labour	Jackie Kirk	778	16.9%
Labour	Pat Vaughan	740	16.0%
Conservative	Andrew Bradley	528	11.4%
Conservative	Jamie Bartch	510	11.1%
Conservative	Peter McNeil	484	10.5%
Green	Fiona McKenna	207	4.5%
Green	Norman Haigh	194	4.2%
Green	Adam Holman	155	3.4%
Liberal Democrats	Stephen Lonsdale	101	2.2%
TUSC	Keri Lowe	75	1.6%
Turnout		4,613	
Labour win (new seat)			
Labour win (new seat)			
Labour win (new seat)			

=== Hartsholme ===
Location of Hartsholme ward

Hartsholme (3)
Party	Candidate	Votes	%
Conservative	Ronald Hills	887	14.5%
Labour	Biff Bean	860	14.0%
Conservative	Andrew Kerry	707	11.5%
Conservative	Marika Riddick	702	11.5%
Labour	Adelle Ellis	687	11.2%
Labour	Liz Massey	663	10.8%
UKIP	Nick Smith	403	6.6%
UKIP	Jeff McGeachie	396	6.5%
UKIP	Nicola Smith	389	6.3%
Green	Angela Porter	132	2.2%
Liberal Democrats	Mervyn Hobden	109	1.8%
Liberal Democrats	Tony Gaskell	106	1.7%
Green	Peaceful Warrior	90	1.5%
Turnout		6,131	
Conservative win (new seat)			
Labour win (new seat)			
Conservative win (new seat)			

=== Minster ===
Location of Minster ward

Minster (3)
Party	Candidate	Votes	%
Conservative	Yvonne Bodger	843	16.4%
Labour	Naomi Tweddle	824	16.1%
Labour	Liz Maxwell	820	16.0%
Labour	Dave Callow	783	15.3%
Conservative	Tony Higgs	757	14.8%
Conservative	Christopher Reid	705	13.8%
Liberal Democrats	James Easter	204	4.0%
Liberal Democrats	Nicole Pouncey	191	3.7%
Turnout		5,127	
Conservative win (new seat)			
Labour win (new seat)			
Labour win (new seat)			

=== Moorland ===
Location of Moorland ward

Moorland (3)
Party	Candidate	Votes	%
Labour	Geoff Ellis	905	20%
Labour	Bob Bushell	857	18.9%
Labour	Adrianna McNulty	759	16.8%
Conservative	David Kerry	557	12.3%
Conservative	Sharon Longthorne	494	10.9%
Conservative	Vasos Melides	366	8.1%
UKIP	Kevin Harrington	340	7.5%
Liberal Democrats	Lynn Pepper	136	3.0%
Liberal Democrats	Ross Pepper	111	2.5%
Turnout		4,525	
Labour win (new seat)			
Labour win (new seat)			
Labour win (new seat)			

=== Park ===
Location of Park ward

Park (3)
Party	Candidate	Votes	%
Labour	Chris Burke	799	19.3%
Labour	Sue Burke	735	17.8%
Labour	Helena Mair	677	16.4%
UKIP	Roly Bunce	280	6.8%
Conservative	Liam Sperrin	245	5.9%
Conservative	Richard Butroid	221	5.3%
Green	Sally Horscroft	213	5.1%
Green	Allegra Wild	211	5.1%
Conservative	Janusz Kala	210	5.1%
Green	Lauren Finka	189	4.6%
Liberal Democrats	Natasha Chapman	159	3.8%
Liberal Democrats	Sean Oxspring	108	2.6%
Liberal Democrats	Aarron Smith	92	2.2%
Turnout		4,139	
Labour win (new seat)			
Labour win (new seat)			
Labour win (new seat)			

=== Witham ===
Location of Witham ward

Witham (3)
Party	Candidate	Votes	%
Conservative	Keith Weaver	790	14.4%
Conservative	Thomas Dyer	756	13.7%
Labour	Jane Loffhagen	724	13.2%
Labour	Bill Bilton	710	12.9%
Conservative	Matthew Wilson	675	12.3%
Labour	Funmi Adeyemi	620	11.3%
UKIP	Tim Richens	442	8.0%
UKIP	Barry Stonham	369	6.7%
Liberal Democrats	Andrew Byrne	217	3.9%
Green	Elizabeth Bathory-Porther	199	3.6%
Turnout		5,502	
Conservative win (new seat)			
Conservative win (new seat)			
Labour win (new seat)			

== By-elections between 2016 and 2018 ==
Carholme By-Election 19 October 2017
Party	Candidate	Votes	%	±%
Labour	Lucinda Preston	922	63.4%	▲6.3%
Conservative	Kateryna R Salvador	368	25.3%	▲5.2%
Green	Benjamin Loryman	83	5.7%	▼8.5%
Liberal Democrats	James R. Brown	82	5.6	▼2.9%
Majority		554	38.1	
Turnout		1,455		
Labour hold		Swing		
