= City of Lincoln Council =

Local authority in Lincoln, England

Type
- Type: Non-metropolitan district

Leadership
- Mayor: Claire Smalley, Liberal Democrat since 19 May 2026
- Leader: Naomi Tweddle, Labour since 14 May 2024
- Chief Executive: Angela Andrews since September 2014

Structure
- Seats: 33 councillors
- Graph of the party split among 33 seats.
- Political groups: Administration (17) Labour (17) Other parties (16) Liberal Democrats (7) Reform (4) Conservative (2) Green (1) Independent (2)
- Length of term: 4 years

Elections
- Last election: 7 May 2026

Meeting place
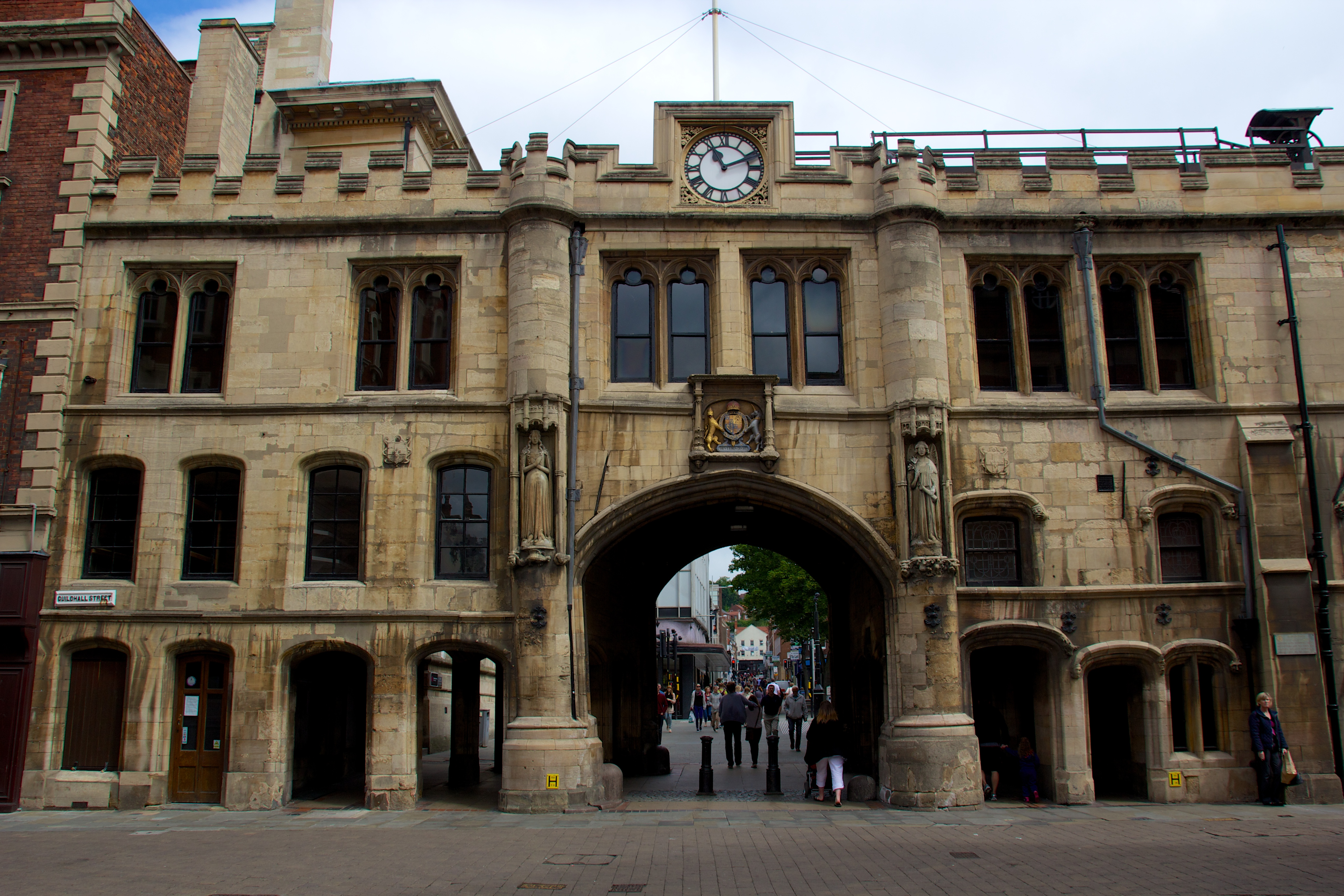
- Guildhall, Saltergate, Lincoln, LN1 1DH

Website
- www.lincoln.gov.uk

City of Lincoln Council is the local authority for the city of Lincoln, in Lincolnshire, England. Lincoln has had some form of council from the Middle Ages onwards. Since 1974 it has been a non-metropolitan district council, meeting at the Guildhall and with main offices at Lincoln City Hall. The council has been under Labour majority control since 2011.

== History ==
Lincoln was an ancient borough, which also held city status from 1072 when the Diocese of Lincoln was established. The borough's earliest known charters were issued by Henry II (reigned 1154–1189). The city was given the right to appoint its own sheriffs in 1409, making it a county corporate, removing it from the jurisdiction of the Sheriff of Lincolnshire and the Lindsey quarter sessions.

The borough was reformed in 1836 to become a municipal borough under the Municipal Corporations Act 1835, which standardised how most boroughs operated across the country. It was then governed by a body formally called the "Mayor, Aldermen and Citizens of the City of Lincoln", generally known as the corporation or city council. When elected county councils were established in 1889 under the Local Government Act 1888 to take over the administrative functions of the quarter sessions, Lincoln was considered large enough for its existing council to provide county-level services. Lincoln was therefore made a county borough, independent from the new Lindsey County Council.

On 1 April 1974, under the Local Government Act 1972, Lincoln was reconstituted to become a non-metropolitan district, altering its powers and responsibilities but keeping the same area and name. The separate county councils which had existed for each of the Parts of Lincolnshire were also amalgamated to create a single Lincolnshire County Council for the first time, with responsibility for county-level services in the city of Lincoln too.

Under current local government reform plans Lincoln was planned to become a unitary authority in 2028 with expanded boundaries including neighbouring wards within North Kesteven and West Lindsey, including Bracebridge Heath, North Hykeham, Saxilby, and Waddingham. In September 2026, the Lincolnshire proposals were halted by the government and placed under review.

== Governance ==
City of Lincoln Council provides district-level services. County-level services are provided by Lincolnshire County Council. There are no civil parishes in the city, which is an unparished area.

== Political control ==
The council has been under Labour majority control since 2011.

Political control of the council since the 1974 reforms has been as follows:

| Party in control | Years |
|---|---|
| Democratic Labour | 1974–1978 |
| No overall control | 1978–1979 |
| Conservative | 1979–1982 |
| Labour | 1982–2007 |
| Conservative | 2007–2010 |
| No overall control | 2010–2011 |
| Labour | 2011–present |

=== Leadership ===
The role of Mayor of Lincoln is now largely ceremonial. Political leadership is instead provided by the leader of the council. The leaders since 1974 have been:

| Councillor | Party | From | To |
|---|---|---|---|
| Fred Allen | Democratic Labour | 1 Apr 1974 | May 1975 |
| Jean Bates | Democratic Labour | May 1975 | 3 Oct 1978 |
| Cecil Robinson | Conservative | 3 Oct 1978 | May 1979 |
| Jim Sullivan | Conservative | May 1979 | May 1982 |
| Peter Archer | Labour | May 1982 | May 1984 |
| Derek Miller | Labour | May 1984 | May 1993 |
| Chris Meanwell | Labour | May 1993 | May 1995 |
| Roland Hurst | Labour | May 1995 | May 1999 |
| Ric Metcalfe | Labour | 18 May 1999 | May 2007 |
| Eddie Strengiel | Conservative | 22 May 2007 | May 2008 |
| Darren Grice | Conservative | 20 May 2008 | May 2011 |
| Ric Metcalfe | Labour | 24 May 2011 | May 2024 |
| Naomi Tweddle | Labour Co-op | 14 May 2024 | |

=== Composition ===
Following the 2026 election, the composition of the council was:

| Party | Councillors |
|---|---|
| Labour | 17 |
| Liberal Democrats | 7 |
| Reform | 4 |
| Conservative | 2 |
| Green | 1 |
| Independent | 2 |
| Total | 33 |

The next election is due in 2027.

== Elections ==
Since the last boundary changes in 2016 the council has comprised 33 councillors representing 11 wards, with each ward electing three councillors. Elections are held three years out of every four, with a third of the council (one councillor for each ward) elected each time for a four year term of office. Lincolnshire County Council elections are held in the fourth year of the cycle when there are no city council elections.

== Premises ==
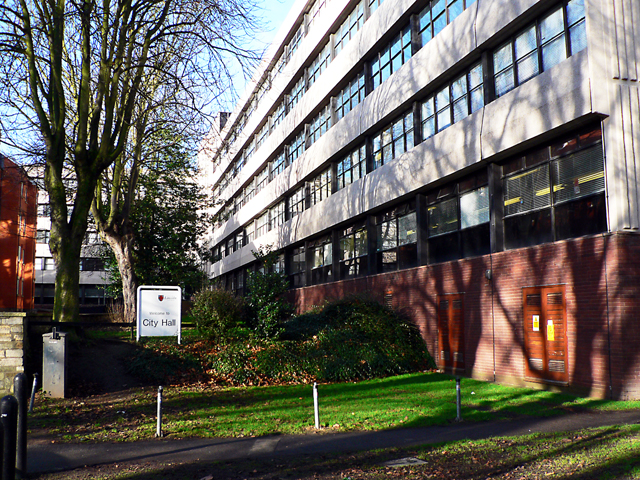
City Hall, Beaumont Fee, Lincoln, LN1 1DD: Council's main offices

Council meetings are held at the Guildhall on Saltergate; the current building was completed c. 1520 on a site which had been used as a guildhall since 1237, having been created from part of one of the gates in the city wall.

The council's main offices are at City Hall on Beaumont Fee, which was built in 1973 and formally opened on 16 March 1974.
