= 2015 City of Lincoln Council election =

← 2014	7 May 2015	2016 →

11 of the 33 seats to City of Lincoln Council 17 seats needed for a majority
	First party	Second party
Party	Labour	Conservative
Seats before	27	6
Seats won	8	3
Seats after	26	7
Seat change	▼1	▲1
Popular vote	16,211	13,855
Percentage	39.9%	34.1%
- Map showing the results of the 2015 Lincoln City Council elections by ward. Red shows Labour seats and blue shows the Conservatives.
Council control before election
Labour
Council control after election
Labour

The 2015 City of Lincoln Council election took place on 7 May 2015 to elect members of City of Lincoln Council in England. This was on the same day as other local elections.

== Overall results ==
The Labour Party retained its majority on the council, but lost one seat, leaving them with 26 seats to the Conservative Party's 7.

2015 City of Lincoln Council Election Result
Party	Seats	Gains	Losses	Net gain/loss	Seats %	Votes %	Votes	+/−
Labour	8	0	1	▼	72.7	39.9	16,211	▼5.2
Conservative	3	1	0	▲	27.3	34.1	13,855	▼2.5
UKIP	0	0	0	Steady	0.0	14.1	5,718	▲7.0
Green	0	0	0	Steady	0.0	7.0	2,837	▲6.1
Liberal Democrats	0	0	0	Steady	0.0	4.2	1,711	▼4.1
TUSC	0	0	0	Steady	0.0	0.8	330	▼1.2

All comparisons in vote share are to the corresponding 2011 election.

== Ward results ==
=== Abbey ===
Location of Abbey ward

Abbey
Party	Candidate	Votes	%
Labour	Fay Smith	1,730	42.9%
Conservative	Yaroslav Pustarnakov	1,034	25.7%
UKIP	Chris Butler	568	14.1%
Green	James Bird	417	10.3%
Liberal Democrats	Aarron Smith	207	5.1%
TUSC	Danny Wilkinson	74	1.8%
Turnout		4,030	55.9%
Labour hold			

=== Birchwood ===
Location of Birchwood ward

Birchwood
Party	Candidate	Votes	%
Conservative	Eddie Strengiel	1,409	42.2%
Labour	Paul Gowen	1,185	35.5%
UKIP	Tony Wells	599	17.9%
Green	John Radford	147	4.4%
Turnout		3,340	55.3%
Conservative hold			

=== Boultham ===
Location of Boultham ward

Boultham
Party	Candidate	Votes	%
Labour	Gary Hewson	1,596	44.8%
Conservative	Christopher Reid	1,110	31.1%
UKIP	Tim Richens	516	14.5%
Green	Ryan Brown	184	5.2%
Liberal Democrats	Lynn Pepper	160	4.5%
Turnout		3,566	62.9%
Labour hold			

=== Bracebridge ===
Location of Bracebridge ward

Bracebridge
Party	Candidate	Votes	%
Conservative	Matthew Wilson	1,603	41.2%
Labour	Jane Loffhagen	1,220	31.3%
UKIP	Barry Stonham	666	17.1%
Liberal Democrats	David Gaskell	236	6.1%
Green	Lee Thomas	169	4.3%
Turnout		3,894	66.8%
Conservative gain from Labour			

Note: This Bracebridge ward seat had been won by the Conservatives the last time it was contested in 2011, but was gained by Labour in a by-election in 2013.

=== Carholme ===
Location of Carholme ward

Carholme
Party	Candidate	Votes	%
Labour	Neil Murray	2,436	44.3%
Conservative	Jamie Bartch	1,466	26.7%
Green	Judith Coops	713	13.0%
UKIP	Mike Wilkinson	437	7.9%
Liberal Democrats	Natasha Chapman	356	6.5%
TUSC	Nick Parker	91	1.7%
Turnout		5,499	66.2%
Labour hold			

=== Castle ===
Location of Castle ward

Castle
Party	Candidate	Votes	%
Labour	Donald Nannestad	1,553	41.2%
Conservative	Alex Hanney	1,191	31.6%
UKIP	David Warde	498	13.2%
Green	Richard Leedham-Green	283	7.5%
Liberal Democrats	Charles Shaw	190	5.0%
TUSC	Michael Hancock	51	1.4%
Turnout		3,766	61.5%
Labour hold			

=== Glebe ===
Location of Glebe ward

Glebe
Party	Candidate	Votes	%
Labour	Patrick Vaughan	1,205	40.2%
Conservative	Yvonne Bodger	1,049	35.0%
UKIP	Max Smith	439	14.6%
Green	Norman Haigh	141	4.7%
Liberal Democrats	Adam Carnie	122	4.1%
TUSC	Keri Lowe	42	1.4%
Turnout		2,998	54.3%
Labour hold			

=== Hartsholme ===
Location of Hartsholme ward

Hartsholme
Party	Candidate	Votes	%
Conservative	Ron Hills	1,642	46.6%
Labour	Biff Bean	1,065	30.2%
UKIP	Nicola Smith	566	16.1%
Liberal Democrats	Benjamin Atkinson	137	3.9%
Green	Peaceful Warrior	114	3.2%
Turnout		3,524	66.9%
Conservative hold			

=== Minster ===
Location of Minster ward

Minster
Party	Candidate	Votes	%
Labour	Carol Daniel	1,497	40.4%
Conservative	David Gratrick	1,426	38.5%
UKIP	Elaine Warde	486	13.1%
Green	Timothy Taylor	262	7.1%
TUSC	Gavyn Graham	35	0.9%
Turnout		3,706	63.3%
Labour gain from Conservative			

=== Moorland ===
Location of Moorland ward

Moorland
Party	Candidate	Votes	%
Labour	Bob Bushell	1,403	41.7%
Conservative	David Denman	1,200	35.7%
UKIP	Kevin Harrington	501	14.9%
Green	James Grigg	134	4.0%
Liberal Democrats	Ross Pepper	125	3.7%
Turnout		3,363	58.7%
Labour hold			

=== Park ===
Location of Park ward

Park
Party	Candidate	Votes	%
Labour	Chris Burke	1,321	44.4%
Conservative	Tracy Talavia	725	24.4%
UKIP	Hannah Smith	442	14.9%
Green	Kenneth Yates	273	9.2%
Liberal Democrats	Iain Baker	178	6.0%
TUSC	Vince Williams	37	1.2%
Turnout		2,976	52.7%
Labour hold			
