= 2008 City of Lincoln Council election =

2008 UK local government election

| ← 2007 | 1 May 2008 | 2010 → |

11 of the 33 seats to City of Lincoln Council 17 seats needed for a majority
- Turnout: 31.4%
| | First party | Second party | Third party |
|---|---|---|---|
| Party | Conservative | Labour | Liberal Democrats |
| Last election | 17 | 15 | 1 |
| Seats won | 7 | 3 | 1 |
| Seats after | 18 | 14 | 1 |
| Seat change | ▲1 | ▼1 | Steady |
| Popular vote | 8,797 | 6,454 | 2,924 |
| Percentage | 44.5% | 32.6% | 14.8% |
- Map showing the results of the 2008 Lincoln City Council elections by ward. Red shows Labour seats and blue shows the Conservatives and orange shows Liberal Democrat.
Council control before election
Conservative
Council control after election
Conservative

The 2008 City of Lincoln Council election took place on 1 May 2008 to elect members of City of Lincoln Council in Lincolnshire, England. This was held on the same day as other local elections. One third of the 33 seats were up for election, with one councillor in each of the 11 wards being elected. As the previous election in 2007 had been an all-out election with new ward boundaries, the seats of the candidates that had finished third in each ward in 2006 were up for election. The Conservative Party retained control of the council.

== Election result ==
2008 Lincoln local election result
| Party | Seats | Gains | Losses | Net gain/loss | Seats % | Votes % | Votes | +/− |
|---|---|---|---|---|---|---|---|---|
| Conservative | 7 | 1 | 0 | ▲1 | 63.6 | 44.5 | 8,797 | |
| Labour | 3 | 0 | 1 | ▼1 | 27.3 | 32.6 | 6,454 | |
| Liberal Democrats | 1 | 0 | 0 | Steady | 9.1 | 14.8 | 2,924 | |
| BNP | 0 | 0 | 0 | Steady | 0.0 | 5.6 | 1,106 | |
| Independent | 0 | 0 | 0 | Steady | 0.0 | 1.0 | 188 | |
| UKIP | 0 | 0 | 0 | Steady | 0.0 | 0.9 | 187 | |
| Socialist Alternative | 0 | 0 | 0 | Steady | 0.0 | 0.6 | 127 | |
| Total | 11 | | | | | | 19,783 | |

== Ward results ==
=== Abbey ===
Location of Abbey ward

Abbey
| Party | Candidate | Votes | % |
|---|---|---|---|
| Labour | Kath Brothwell | 657 | 40.0% |
| Conservative | Cordelia McCartney | 625 | 38.1% |
| Liberal Democrats | Heather Cullen | 259 | 15.8% |
| UKIP | Carol Pearson | 101 | 6.2% |
| Majority | | 32 | 1.9% |
| Turnout | | 1,642 | 25.2% |
| Labour hold | | | |

=== Birchwood ===
Location of Birchwood ward

Birchwood
| Party | Candidate | Votes | % |
|---|---|---|---|
| Conservative | John Metcalfe | 740 | 43.5% |
| Labour | Stephen Allnutt | 464 | 27.2% |
| Independent | Jack Humphries | 188 | 11.0% |
| BNP | Philip Marshall | 183 | 10.7% |
| Liberal Democrats | George Richardson | 128 | 7.5% |
| Majority | | 276 | 16.3% |
| Turnout | | 1,703 | 30.0% |
| Conservative hold | | | |

=== Boultham ===
Location of Boultham ward

Boultham
| Party | Candidate | Votes | % |
|---|---|---|---|
| Labour | Richard Coupland | 667 | 35.4% |
| Conservative | Andrew Bradley | 655 | 34.8% |
| BNP | Colin Westcott | 342 | 18.2% |
| Liberal Democrats | Ross Pepper | 218 | 11.6% |
| Majority | | 12 | 0.6% |
| Turnout | | 1,882 | 33.5% |
| Labour hold | | | |

=== Bracebridge ===
Location of Bracebridge ward

Bracebridge
| Party | Candidate | Votes | % |
|---|---|---|---|
| Conservative | Marc Jones | 1,126 | 60.1% |
| Labour | David Rimmington | 517 | 27.6% |
| BNP | Dean Lowther | 230 | 12.3% |
| Majority | | 609 | 32.5% |
| Turnout | | 1,873 | 32.6% |
| Conservative hold | | | |

=== Carholme ===
Location of Carholme ward

Carholme
| Party | Candidate | Votes | % |
|---|---|---|---|
| Liberal Democrats | Helen Heath | 852 | 41.9% |
| Labour | Malcolm Withers | 547 | 26.9% |
| Conservative | Daniel Hutchinson | 509 | 25.0% |
| Socialist Alternative | Nick Parker | 127 | 6.2% |
| Majority | | 305 | 15.0% |
| Turnout | | 2,035 | 30.6% |
| Liberal Democrats hold | | | |

=== Castle ===
Location of Castle ward

Castle
| Party | Candidate | Votes | % |
|---|---|---|---|
| Conservative | Alister Williams | 783 | 43.3% |
| Labour | Rachel Taylor | 699 | 38.6% |
| Liberal Democrats | Charles Shaw | 327 | 18.1% |
| Majority | | 84 | 4.7% |
| Turnout | | 1,809 | 32.3% |
| Conservative gain from Labour | | | |

=== Glebe ===
Location of Glebe ward

Glebe
| Party | Candidate | Votes | % |
|---|---|---|---|
| Conservative | David Denman | 832 | 49.1% |
| Labour | Larry Wells | 524 | 30.9% |
| BNP | Alan Kirk | 174 | 10.3% |
| Liberal Democrats | Stephen Morgan | 166 | 9.8% |
| Majority | | 308 | 18.2% |
| Turnout | | 1,696 | 31.2% |
| Conservative hold | | | |

=== Hartsholme ===
Location of Hartsholme ward

Hartsholme
| Party | Candidate | Votes | % |
|---|---|---|---|
| Conservative | Andrew Kerry | 1,212 | 65.5% |
| Labour | Tony Duncan | 347 | 18.8% |
| Liberal Democrats | Lynn Pepper | 291 | 15.7% |
| Majority | | 865 | 46.7% |
| Turnout | | 1,850 | 34.5% |
| Conservative hold | | | |

=== Minster ===
Location of Minster ward

Minster
| Party | Candidate | Votes | % |
|---|---|---|---|
| Conservative | Sandra Gratrick | 1,093 | 52.0% |
| Labour | Judy Renshaw | 769 | 36.6% |
| Liberal Democrats | Daphne Shaw | 238 | 11.3% |
| Majority | | 324 | 15.4% |
| Turnout | | 2,100 | 37.2% |
| Conservative hold | | | |

=== Moorland ===
Location of Moorland ward

Moorland
| Party | Candidate | Votes | % |
|---|---|---|---|
| Conservative | Paul Grice | 859 | 46.5% |
| Labour | Bob Bushell | 646 | 34.9% |
| BNP | Olivia Wolverson | 177 | 9.6% |
| Liberal Democrats | Jenny Shaw | 167 | 9.0% |
| Majority | | 213 | 11.6% |
| Turnout | | 1,849 | 32.5% |
| Conservative hold | | | |

=== Park ===
Location of Park ward

Park
| Party | Candidate | Votes | % |
|---|---|---|---|
| Labour | Brent Charlesworth | 617 | 45.9% |
| Conservative | Sally Grice | 363 | 27.0% |
| Liberal Democrats | Ryan Cullen | 278 | 20.7% |
| UKIP | Steve Pearson | 86 | 6.4% |
| Majority | | 254 | 18.9% |
| Turnout | | 1,344 | 25.2% |
| Labour hold | | | |
