= 2014 City of Lincoln Council election =

Election in England

← 2012	22 May 2014	2015 →

11 of the 33 seats to City of Lincoln Council 17 seats needed for a majority
	First party	Second party
Party	Labour	Conservative
Last election	24	9
Seats before	25^{†}	8^{†}
Seats won	9	2
Seats after	27	6
Seat change	▲2	▼2
Popular vote	7,730	5,280
Percentage	39.9%	27.3%
- Map showing the results of the 2014 Lincoln City Council elections by ward. Red shows Labour seats and blue shows the Conservative Party's.^{†} Labour gained a seat from the Conservatives in a by-election in 2013
Council control before election
Labour
Council control after election
Labour

The 2014 City of Lincoln Council election took place on 22 May 2014 to elect members of City of Lincoln Council in England. This was on the same day as other local elections. The Labour Party increased its majority on the council by gaining three seats, leaving them with 27 seats to the Conservatives 6.

== Election results ==
2014 Lincoln Council Election Results
Party	Seats	Gains	Losses	Net gain/loss	Seats %	Votes %	Votes	+/−
Labour	9	2	0	▲2	81.8	39.9	7,730	▲3.9
Conservative	2	0	2	▼2	18.2	27.3	5,280	▼6.7
UKIP	0	0	0	Steady	0.0	23.3	4,520	▲21.3
Liberal Democrats	0	0	1	▼1	0.0	4.7	901	▼18.4
Green	0	0	0	Steady	0.0	2.4	467	New
TUSC	0	0	0	Steady	0.0	1.8	353	▲1.6
Independent	0	0	0	Steady	0.0	0.6	120	New

All comparisons in vote share are to the corresponding 2010 election.

== Ward results ==
=== Abbey ===
Location of Abbey ward

Abbey
Party	Candidate	Votes	%
Labour	Peter West	744	43.2%
UKIP	Chris Butler	385	22.3%
Conservative	Christopher Reid	364	21.1%
Liberal Democrats	Heather Cullen	138	8.0%
TUSC	Nick Parker	93	5.4%
Majority		359	20.9%
Turnout		1,724	
Labour hold			

=== Birchwood ===
Location of Birchwood ward

Birchwood
Party	Candidate	Votes	%
Labour	Anthony Gray	579	33.6%
Conservative	David Denman	576	33.4%
UKIP	Tony Wells	523	30.3%
TUSC	Samuel Mumby	47	2.7%
Majority		3	0.2%
Turnout		1,725	
Labour gain from Conservative			

=== Boultham ===
Location of Boultham ward

Boultham
Party	Candidate	Votes	%
Labour	Ralph Toofany	834	47.2%
UKIP	Jane Smith	445	25.2%
Conservative	Alexander Gilder	363	20.5%
Liberal Democrats	Lynn Pepper	79	4.5%
TUSC	Nicole Good	46	2.6%
Majority		389	22.0%
Turnout		1,767	
Labour hold			

=== Bracebridge ===
Location of Bracebridge ward

Bracebridge
Party	Candidate	Votes	%
Conservative	Keith Weaver	674	35.6%
Labour	Carol Daniel	576	30.4%
UKIP	Barry Stonham	551	29.1%
Liberal Democrats	Tony Gaskell	92	4.9%
Majority		98	5.2%
Turnout		1,893	
Conservative hold			

=== Carholme ===
Location of Carholme ward

Carholme
Party	Candidate	Votes	%
Labour	Karen Lee	1,129	52.7%
Conservative	Vasos Melides	413	19.3%
UKIP	Mike Wilkinson	328	15.3%
Liberal Democrats	Natasha Chapman	143	6.7%
Independent	Jacek Musialik	80	3.7%
TUSC	Lewis Shearwood	48	2.2%
Majority		716	33.4%
Turnout		2,141	
Labour hold			

=== Castle ===
Location of Castle ward

Castle
Party	Candidate	Votes	%
Labour	Loraine Woolley	655	38.1%
Conservative	Kirsty Esberger	389	22.6%
UKIP	David Warde	382	22.2%
Green	Ruth Dredge	152	8.8%
Liberal Democrats	Benjamin Atkinson	102	5.9%
TUSC	Danny Wilkinson	39	2.3%
Majority		266	15.5%
Turnout		1,719	
Labour hold			

=== Glebe ===
Location of Glebe ward

Glebe
Party	Candidate	Votes	%
Labour	Ric Metcalfe	569	36.8%
Conservative	Matthew Wilson	402	26.0%
UKIP	Max Smith	368	23.8%
Green	Norman Haigh	110	7.1%
Liberal Democrats	David Harding-Price	81	5.2%
TUSC	Keri Lowe	16	1.0%
Majority		167	10.8%
Turnout		1,546	
Labour hold			

=== Hartsholme ===
Location of Hartsholme ward

Hartsholme
Party	Candidate	Votes	%
Conservative	Marika Riddick	730	39.1%
Labour	Biff Bean	632	33.8%
UKIP	Elaine Warde	429	23.0%
Liberal Democrats	Jessica Key	78	4.2%
Majority		98	5.3%
Turnout		1,869	
Conservative hold			

=== Minster ===
Location of Minster ward

Minster
Party	Candidate	Votes	%
Labour	Liz Maxwell	683	35.1%
Conservative	Yvonne Bodger	660	34.0%
UKIP	Joseph Willan	405	20.8%
Green	Valerie Wilkinson	105	5.4%
Liberal Democrats	Michael Brown	72	3.7%
TUSC	Michael Hancock	19	1.0%
Majority		23	1.1%
Turnout		1,944	
Labour gain from Conservative			

=== Moorland ===
Location of Moorland ward

Moorland
Party	Candidate	Votes	%
Labour	Geoff Ellis	768	43.9%
Conservative	Marc Jones	505	28.8%
UKIP	James Simpson	396	22.6%
Liberal Democrats	Ross Pepper	54	3.1%
TUSC	Vince Williams	28	1.6%
Majority		263	15.1%
Turnout		1,751	
Labour hold			

=== Park ===
Location of Park ward

Park
Party	Candidate	Votes	%
Labour	David Jackson	561	43.4%
UKIP	Hannah Smith	308	23.8%
Conservative	Janusz Kala	204	15.8%
Green	Kenneth Yates	100	7.7%
Liberal Democrats	Iain Baker	62	4.8%
Independent	Zivile Zuokiene	40	3.1%
TUSC	Gavyn Graham	17	1.3%
Majority		253	19.6%
Turnout		1,292	
Labour hold			
