= 2012 City of Lincoln Council election =

UK municipal election

← 2011	3 May 2012	2014 →

11 of the 33 seats to City of Lincoln Council 17 seats needed for a majority
	First party	Second party
Party	Labour	Conservative
Seats before	17	15
Seats won	10	1
Seats after	24	8
Seat change	▲7	▼7
Popular vote	8,823	5,618
Percentage	50.5%	32.2%
- Map showing the results of the 2012 Lincoln City Council elections by ward. Red shows Labour seats and blue shows the Conservatives.
Council control before election
Labour
Council control after election
Labour

The 2012 City of Lincoln Council election took place on 3 May 2012 to elect one-third of the members of City of Lincoln Council in Lincolnshire, England, for a 4-year term of office. This was on the same day as other 2012 United Kingdom local elections.

All locally registered electors (British, Irish, Commonwealth and European Union citizens) who were aged 18 or over on Thursday 2 May 2012 were entitled to vote in the local elections. Those who were temporarily away from their ordinary address (for example, away working, on holiday, in student accommodation or in hospital) were also entitled to vote in the local elections, although those who had moved abroad and registered as overseas electors cannot vote in the local elections. It is possible to register to vote at more than one address (such as a university student who had a term-time address and lives at home during holidays) at the discretion of the local Electoral Register Office, but it remains an offence to vote more than once in the same local government election.

== Summary ==
The Labour Party retained overall control of the council with an increased majority, gaining 7 seats from the Conservatives who retained a single contested seat. No other party won any seats and the Liberal Democrats were out-polled by the UKIP and lost their sole councillor. After the election the party representation was Labour Party 24 and Conservative Party (UK) 8; Others 1.

From the comments of the party leaders, it appears that significant numbers of Conservative voters withheld their support and the Conservatives also blamed the intervention of UKIP candidates.

== Candidates ==
Labour and Conservative candidates contested every ward.

== Election results ==
Lincoln Council Election Results 2012
Party	Seats	Gains	Losses	Net gain/loss	Seats %	Votes %	Votes	+/−
Labour	10	7	0	▲7	90.9	50.5	8,823	▲17.9
Conservative	1	0	6	▼6	9.1	32.2	5,618	▼11.3
UKIP	0	0	0	Steady	0.0	7.7	1,347	▲6.8
Liberal Democrats	0	0	1	▼1	0.0	6.9	1,197	▼7.9
TUSC	0	0	0	Steady	0.0	2.4	423	New
BNP	0	0	0	Steady	0.0	0.3	49	▼5.3
Total	11						17,457	

All comparisons in vote share are to the corresponding 2008 election.

== Ward results ==
=== Abbey ===
Location of Abbey ward

Abbey
Party	Candidate	Votes	%
Labour	Kath Brothwell	892	57.3%
Conservative	Laura Goodliffe	386	24.8%
Liberal Democrats	Natasha Chapman	141	9.1%
TUSC	Gavyn Graham	139	8.9%
Majority		506	32.5%
Turnout		1,558	23.4%
Labour hold			

=== Birchwood ===
Location of Birchwood ward

Birchwood
Party	Candidate	Votes	%
Labour	Rosanne Kirk	686	45.0%
Conservative	John Metcalfe	467	30.6%
UKIP	Tony Wells	287	18.8%
Liberal Democrats	Janice Charters	85	5.6%
Majority		219	14.4%
Turnout		1,525	25.2%
Labour gain from Conservative			

=== Boultham ===
Location of Boultham ward

Boultham
Party	Candidate	Votes	%
Labour	Gill Clayton-Hewson	885	52.9%
Conservative	Carly Sharples	530	31.7%
UKIP	Nick Smith	183	10.9%
Liberal Democrats	Ross Pepper	74	4.4%
Majority		355	21.2%
Turnout		1,672	30.4%
Labour hold			

=== Bracebridge ===
Location of Bracebridge ward

Bracebridge
Party	Candidate	Votes	%
Labour	Bill Bilton	719	41.2%
Conservative	Marc Jones	712	40.8%
UKIP	Callum Newton	183	10.5%
Liberal Democrats	Lynn Pepper	82	4.7%
BNP	Dean Lowther	49	2.8%
Majority		7	0.4%
Turnout		1,745	30.4%
Labour gain from Conservative			

=== Carholme ===
Location of Carholme ward

Carholme
Party	Candidate	Votes	%
Labour	Tony Speakman	1,042	55.7%
Conservative	Vasos Melides	413	22.1%
Liberal Democrats	David Harding-Price	173	9.2%
UKIP	Ollie Foster	138	7.4%
TUSC	Nick Parker	106	5.7%
Majority		629	33.6%
Turnout		1,872	23.6%
Labour gain from Liberal Democrats			

=== Castle ===
Location of Castle ward

Castle
Party	Candidate	Votes	%
Labour	Jim Hanrahan	1,007	64.1%
Conservative	Malcolm Barham	423	26.9%
Liberal Democrats	Charles Shaw	142	9.0%
Majority		584	37.2%
Turnout		1,572	26.4%
Labour gain from Conservative			

=== Glebe ===
Location of Glebe ward

Glebe
Party	Candidate	Votes	%
Labour	Jackie Kirk	731	52.3%
Conservative	David Denman	500	35.7%
Liberal Democrats	Charlotte Harding-Price	168	12.0%
Majority		231	16.6%
Turnout		1,399	26.3%
Labour gain from Conservative			

=== Hartsholme ===
Location of Hartsholme ward

Hartsholme
Party	Candidate	Votes	%
Conservative	Andrew Kerry	672	45.6%
Labour	Sean Burke	442	30.0%
UKIP	Jane Smith	259	17.6%
Liberal Democrats	Jim Charters	102	6.9%
Majority		230	15.6%
Turnout		1,475	27.8%
Conservative hold			

=== Minster ===
Location of Minster ward

Minster
Party	Candidate	Votes	%
Labour	Sue Burke	909	48.4%
Conservative	Sandra Gratrick	684	36.4%
UKIP	Ken Pratt	173	9.2%
Liberal Democrats	Aidan Turner	72	3.8%
TUSC	Emma-Jayne Woodhall	41	2.2%
Majority		225	12.0%
Turnout		1,879	32.3%
Labour gain from Conservative			

=== Moorland ===
Location of Moorland ward

Moorland
Party	Candidate	Votes	%
Labour	Adrianna Ellis	836	51.9%
Conservative	Keith Weaver	634	39.3%
TUSC	Karen Williams	78	4.8%
Liberal Democrats	Robert Heathorn	64	4.0%
Majority		202	12.6%
Turnout		1,612	28.3%
Labour gain from Conservative			

=== Park ===
Location of Park ward

Park
Party	Candidate	Votes	%
Labour	Brent Charlesworth	674	58.7%
Conservative	Graham Kent	197	17.2%
UKIP	Joe Harrison	124	10.8%
Liberal Democrats	Ryan Cullen	94	8.2%
TUSC	Lucy Bland	59	5.1%
Majority		477	41.5%
Turnout		1,148	22.6%
Labour hold			

== By-elections between 2012 and 2014 ==
Bracebridge By-Election 22 August 2013
Party	Candidate	Votes	%	±%
Labour	Katie Vause	577	38.7%	▼2.5
Conservative	David Denman	480	32.2%	▼8.6
UKIP	Elaine Elizabeth Warde	345	32.1%	▲12.7
Liberal Democrats	Ross David Pepper	75	5.0%	▲0.3
TUSC	Karen Elizabeth Williams	14	0.9%	▲0.9
Majority		97	6.5%	
Turnout		1,491	26%	
Labour gain from Conservative		Swing		
