= Harry Ziegler =

German historian

Harry Ziegler is a German historian. He was a senior lecturer at the University of Lincoln until 2019. He taught continental European history of the 19th and 20th centuries, with an emphasis on their political and cultural aspects and interactions. His main focus was on German history of the 1920s and 1930s, as well as exploring the relationship between popular fictions and the societies in which they are produced and consumed.

In the 2011 Lincoln Council elections he ran as the Trade Unionist and Socialist Coalition candidate.

Ziegler studied at Sciences Po and completed a Master of Arts (MA) at the University of Stuttgart.

== Publications ==
- Ziegler, Harry (Fall 1999). "History and Popular Fiction: Two Worlds Collide. A reply to Feilitzsch". Journal of Popular Culture. 33 (2). Bowling Green, Ohio. doi:10.1111/j.0022-3840.1999.3302_111.x.
- Ziegler, Harry (1998). "Anarchy and Order: Re-inventing the Medieval in contemporary popular narrative". In Arnold, J.; Davies, K.; Ditchfield, S. (eds.). History and Heritage: Consuming the Past in Contemporary Culture. Donhead Publishing. ISBN 978-1-873394-28-1. OCLC 50155238.
- Ziegler, Harry (1998). "Karl May: Plädoyer für einen kulturwissenschaftlichen Forschungsansatz". Jahrbuch der Karl-May-Gesellschaft (in German). Hussum. pp. 177–193. Archived from the original on 31 August 2004.
- Ziegler, Harry (June 1997). "Renners Nationalcharacter oder: die Tücken akademischer Beweisführung" (PDF). Mitteilungen der Karl-May-Gesellschaft (in German) (112): 42–49.
- Ziegler, Harry (September 1996). "Karl May als Vertreter eines deutschen Nationalcharacters? Eine Antwort auf E. Renner" (PDF). Mitteilungen der Karl-May-Gesellschaft (in German) (109).
