= 2011 City of Lincoln Council election =

2011 UK local government election

← 2010	5 May 2011	2012 →

All 33 seats to City of Lincoln Council 17 seats needed for a majority
- Turnout: 36.6%
	First party	Second party	Third party
Party	Labour	Conservative	Liberal Democrats
Last election	16	16	1
Seats won	7	4	0
Seats after	17	15	1
Seat change	▲1	▼1	Steady
Popular vote	10,559	8,573	1,951
Percentage	45.1%	36.6%	8.3%
- Map showing the results of the 2011 Lincoln City Council elections by ward. Red shows Labour seats and blue shows the Conservatives.
Council control before election
No overall control
Council control after election
Labour Party

Elections to City of Lincoln Council were held on Thursday 5 May 2011.

There were 11 seats up for election, one third of the councillors. The Labour Party gained control of the council, which had previously been under no overall control.

== Election result ==
2011 Lincoln City Council election
Party	Seats	Gains	Losses	Net gain/loss	Seats %	Votes %	Votes	+/−
Labour	7	1	0	▲1	63.6	45.1	10,559	
Conservative	4	0	1	▼1	36.4	36.6	8,573	
Liberal Democrats	0	0	0	Steady	0.0	8.3	1,951	
UKIP	0	0	0	Steady	0.0	7.1	1,664	
TUSC	0	0	0	Steady	0.0	2.0	479	
Green	0	0	0	Steady	0.0	0.9	205	

== Ward results ==
=== Abbey Ward ===
Location of Abbey ward

Abbey Ward
Party	Candidate	Votes	%
Labour	Fay Smith	1,052	48.3%
Conservative	Barry Reeves	619	28.4%
Liberal Democrats	Charly Harding-Price	236	10.8%
UKIP	Pat Nurse	151	6.9%
TUSC	Richard Steven Banks	120	5.5%
Majority		433	19.9%
Turnout		2,178	31.16%
Labour hold			

=== Birchwood Ward ===
Location of Birchwood ward

Birchwood Ward
Party	Candidate	Votes	%
Conservative	Eddie Strengiel	847	41.9%
Labour Co-op	Rosanne Kirk	826	40.8%
UKIP	Tony Wells	205	10.1%
Liberal Democrats	Jan Charters	145	7.2%
Majority		21	1.1%
Turnout		2,023	34.2%
Conservative hold			

=== Boultham Ward ===
Location of Boultham ward

Boultham Ward
Party	Candidate	Votes	%
Labour	Gary Trevor Hewson	1,196	54.8%
Conservative	Sharon Dawn Longthorne	671	30.8%
UKIP	Nick Smith	145	6.6%
Liberal Democrats	Lynn Joan Pepper	139	6.4%
TUSC	Rupert Walker	31	1.4%
Majority		525	24.0%
Turnout		2182	39.92%
Labour hold			

=== Bracebridge Ward ===
Location of Bracebridge ward

Bracebridge Ward
Party	Candidate	Votes	%
Conservative	Darren Peter Grice	1,134	49.3%
Labour	Bill Bilton	932	40.5%
UKIP	Callum Christophe Newton	234	10.2%
Majority		202	8.8%
Turnout		2,300	40.47%
Conservative hold			

=== Carholme Ward ===
Location of Carholme ward

Carholme Ward
Party	Candidate	Votes	%
Labour	Neil McElhinny Murray	1,248	47.5%
Conservative	Vasos Melides	594	22.6%
Liberal Democrats	Charles William Shaw	407	15.5%
Green	Nicola Watson	205	7.8%
UKIP	Mike Murray	113	4.3%
TUSC	Nick Parker	62	2.4%
Majority		654	24.9%
Turnout		2,629	
Labour hold			

=== Castle Ward ===
Location of Castle ward

Castle Ward
Party	Candidate	Votes	%
Labour	Donald James Nannestad	1,088	50.7%
Conservative	Drew Anthony Stafford	661	30.8%
Liberal Democrats	Ross David Pepper	194	9.0%
UKIP	Peter Engel Kort	144	6.7%
TUSC	Dave Pike	59	2.7%
Majority		427	19.9%
Turnout		2,146	
Labour hold			

=== Glebe Ward ===
Location of Glebe ward

Glebe Ward
Party	Candidate	Votes	%
Labour	Patrick Joseph Vaughan	832	43.8%
Conservative	Paul Alan Lewis	731	38.5%
Liberal Democrats	David Harding-Price	170	8.9%
UKIP	Buffy-Jo Hogan	110	5.8%
TUSC	Gavyn Robert Graham	58	3.1%
Majority		101	5.3%
Turnout		1,901	
Labour gain from Conservative			

=== Hartsholme Ward ===
Location of Hartsholme ward

Hartsholme Ward
Party	Candidate	Votes	%
Conservative	Ronald Hills	1,107	52.8%
Labour	Sean Burke	586	27.9%
UKIP	Jane Smith	206	9.8%
Liberal Democrats	James Jopson Charters	198	9.4%
Majority		521	24.9%
Turnout		2,097	
Conservative hold			

=== Minster Ward ===
Location of Minster ward

Minster Ward
Party	Candidate	Votes	%
Conservative	David Frederick Gratrick	1,018	43.7%
Labour Co-op	Jim Hanrahan	989	42.5%
Liberal Democrats	Timothy Christopher McDonnell-Woods	142	6.1%
UKIP	Ken Pratt	121	5.2%
TUSC	Emma Woodhall	57	2.4%
Majority		29	1.2%
Turnout		2,327	
Conservative hold			

=== Moorland Ward ===
Location of Moorland ward

Moorland Ward
Party	Candidate	Votes	%
Labour	Bob Bushall	962	46.7%
Conservative	Keith James Weaver	794	38.6%
Liberal Democrats	Jenny Helen Shaw	140	6.8%
UKIP	David Frank Warde	125	6.1%
TUSC	Karen Elizabeth Williams	37	1.8%
Majority		168	8.1%
Turnout		2,058	
Labour gain from Conservative			

=== Park Ward ===
Location of Park ward

Park Ward
Party	Candidate	Votes	%
Labour	Chris Burke	848	53.3%
Conservative	Graham Kent	397	25.0%
Liberal Democrats	Heather Elizabeth Cullen	180	11.3%
UKIP	Hannah Poppy Smith	110	6.9%
TUSC	Harry Ziegler	55	3.5%
Majority		451	28.3%
Turnout		1,590	
Labour hold			
