= 2010 City of Lincoln Council election =

2010 UK local government election

- 6 May 2010

All 33 seats to City of Lincoln Council 17 seats needed for a majority
	First party	Second party	Third party
Party	Labour	Conservative	Liberal Democrats
Last election	14	18	1
Seats won	8	4	0
Seats after	16	16	1
Seat change	▲2	▼2	Steady
Popular vote	14,110	13,307	9,027
Percentage	36.1%	34.0%	23.1%
- Map showing the results of the 2010 Lincoln City Council elections by ward. Red shows Labour seats and blue shows the Conservatives.
Council control before election
No overall control
Council control after election
No overall control

The 2010 City of Lincoln Council election took place on 6 May 2010 to elect members of City of Lincoln Council in Lincolnshire, England. This was held on the same day as other local elections, as well as the parliamentary general election. One third of the 33 seats were up for election, with one councillor in each of the 11 wards being elected. As the 2007 election had been an all-out election with new ward boundaries, the seats of the candidates that had finished second in each ward in 2006 were up for election. The Conservative Party retained control of the council.

== Election result ==
2010 Lincoln local election result
Party	Seats	Gains	Losses	Net gain/loss	Seats %	Votes %	Votes	+/−
Labour	8	2	0	▲2	66.7	36.1	14,110	
Conservative	4	0	2	▼2	33.3	34.0	13,307	
Liberal Democrats	0	1	0	▲1	0.0	23.1	9,027	
BNP	0	0	0	Steady	0.0	4.7	1,850	
UKIP	0	0	0	Steady	0.0	2.0	775	
TUSC	0	0	0	Steady	0.0	0.2	71	
Total	12						39,131	

== Ward results ==
=== Abbey ===
Location of Abbey ward

Abbey
Party	Candidate	Votes	%
Labour	Peter West	1,438	37.0%
Conservative	James Clarkson	1,155	29.7%
Liberal Democrats	Matthew Holden	1,018	26.2%
UKIP	Pat Nurse	207	5.3%
TUSC	Richard Banks	71	1.8%
Majority		283	7.3%
Turnout		3,889	55.5%
Labour hold			

=== Birchwood ===
Location of Birchwood ward

Birchwood
Party	Candidate	Votes	%
Conservative	Jane Clark	1,245	37.0%
Labour	Lynn Gray	1,165	34.6%
Liberal Democrats	Janice Charters	611	18.2%
BNP	Philip Marshall	192	5.7%
UKIP	Tony Wells	151	4.5%
Majority		80	2.4%
Turnout		3,364	57.0%
Conservative hold			

=== Boultham ===
Location of Boultham ward

Boultham
Party	Candidate	Votes	%
Labour	Ralph Toofany	1,536	43.9%
Conservative	Dean Wormleighton	1,025	29.3%
Liberal Democrats	Lynn Pepper	690	19.7%
UKIP	Nick Smith	248	7.1%
Majority		511	14.6%
Turnout		3,499	62.4%
Labour hold			

=== Bracebridge ===
Location of Bracebridge ward

Bracebridge
Party	Candidate	Votes	%
Conservative	Hilton Spratt	1,632	41.8%
Labour	David Rimmington	1,143	29.3%
Liberal Democrats	Heather Cullen	775	19.9%
BNP	Dean Lowther	206	5.3%
UKIP	Carol Pearson	148	3.8%
Majority		489	12.5%
Turnout		3,904	66.9%
Conservative hold			

=== Carholme ===
Location of Carholme ward

Carholme
Party	Candidate	Votes	%
Labour	Karen Lee	1,688	37.0%
Liberal Democrats	Charles Shaw	1,681	36.8%
Conservative	Marion Mellows	1,198	26.2%
Majority		7	0.2%
Turnout		4,567	62.8%
Labour hold			

=== Castle ===
Location of Castle ward

Castle
Party	Candidate	Votes	%
Labour	Loraine Woolley	1,353	37.6%
Conservative	Kevin Bushell	1,069	29.7%
Liberal Democrats	Adrian Heath	974	27.0%
UKIP	Peter Kort	207	5.7%
Majority		284	7.9%
Turnout		3,603	62.5%
Labour hold			

=== Glebe ===
Location of Glebe ward

Glebe
Party	Candidate	Votes	%
Labour	Ric Metcalfe	1,259	40.7%
Conservative	Carly Warren	1,097	35.5%
Liberal Democrats	Gary Watts	555	18.0%
UKIP	Buffy-Jo Hogan	180	5.8%
Majority		162	5.2%
Turnout		3,091	56.7%
Labour hold			

=== Hartsholme ===
Location of Hartsholme ward

Hartsholme
Party	Candidate	Votes	%
Conservative	Geoffrey Kirby	1,724	48.5%
Labour	Sean Burkey	861	24.2%
Liberal Democrats	James Charters	734	20.7%
UKIP	Jane Smith	232	6.5%
Majority		863	24.3%
Turnout		3,551	65.9%
Conservative hold			

=== Minster ===
Location of Minster ward

Minster
Party	Candidate	Votes	%
Conservative	Yvonne Bodger	1,358	38.0%
Labour	Chris Burke	1,245	34.8%
Liberal Democrats	Jerry Parker	725	20.3%
BNP	Olivia Wolverson	145	4.1%
UKIP	Ken Pratt	104	2.9%
Majority		113	3.2%
Turnout		3,577	62.3%
Conservative hold			

=== Moorland (2 seats) ===
Location of Moorland ward

Moorland (2 seats)
Party	Candidate	Votes	%
Labour	Geoffrey Ellis	1,189	20.8%
Labour	Bob Bushell	1,110	19.5%
Conservative	Paul Lewis	1,075	18.8%
Conservative	Keith Weaver	970	17.0%
Liberal Democrats	George Richardson	500	8.8%
Liberal Democrats	Jenny Shaw	455	8.0%
BNP	Philip Staples	232	4.1%
UKIP	David Warde	172	3.0%
Turnout		5,703	57.5%
Labour gain from Conservative			
Labour gain from Conservative			

=== Park ===
Location of Park ward

Park
Party	Candidate	Votes	%
Labour	David Jackson	1,233	42.1%
Liberal Democrats	Ross Pepper	764	26.1%
Conservative	Graham Kent	729	24.9%
UKIP	Steven Pearson	201	6.9%
Majority		469	16.0%
Turnout		2,927	54.5%
Labour hold			
