= 2007 City of Lincoln Council election =

2007 UK local government election

- 3 May 2007

All 33 seats to City of Lincoln Council 17 seats needed for a majority
- Turnout: 33.9%
	First party	Second party	Third party
Party	Conservative	Labour	Liberal Democrats
Last election	11	20	2
Seats won	17	15	1
Seat change	▲6	▼5	▼1
Popular vote	8,065	7,681	2,569
Percentage	32.6%	31.1%	10.4%
- Map showing the results of the 2007 Lincoln City Council elections by ward. Red shows Labour seats and blue shows the Conservatives. Striped wards indicate wards with mixed representation.
Council control before election
Labour
Council control after election
Conservative

The 2007 City of Lincoln Council election took place on 3 May 2007 to elect members of City of Lincoln Council in Lincolnshire, England. This was held on the same day as other local elections. All 33 seats were up for election, with 3 councillors in each of the 11 wards being elected following a boundary review. The Conservative Party gained control of the council from the Labour Party.

== Election result ==
2007 Lincoln local election result
Party	Seats	Gains	Losses	Net gain/loss	Seats %	Votes %	Votes	+/−
Conservative	17			▲6	51.5	32.6	8,065	
Labour	15			▼5	45.5	31.1	7,681	
Liberal Democrats	1			▼1	3.0	10.4	2,569	
BNP	0			Steady	0.0	12.4	3,054	
UKIP	0			Steady	0.0	8.2	2,026	
Green	0			Steady	0.0	3.6	881	
Independent	0			Steady	0.0	1.2	285	
Socialist	0			Steady	0.0	0.7	162	
Total	33						24,723	

== Ward results ==
=== Abbey ===
Location of Abbey ward

Abbey
Party	Candidate	Votes	%
Labour	Fay Smith	714	
Labour	Peter West	707	
Labour	Kath Brothwell	653	
Conservative	Cordelia McCartney	471	
Conservative	Susan Harland	463	
Conservative	Michael Carr	387	
Green	Gail Phillips	341	
Liberal Democrats	Daphne Shaw	310	
BNP	Olivia Wolverson	250	
UKIP	Carol Pearson	169	
Turnout			28.4%
Labour win (new seat)			
Labour win (new seat)			
Labour win (new seat)			

=== Birchwood ===
Location of Birchwood ward

Birchwood
Party	Candidate	Votes	%
Conservative	Edmund Strengiel	799	
Conservative	Jane Clark	739	
Conservative	John Metcalfe	693	
Labour	Stephen Allnutt	556	
Labour	Tony Duncan	456	
Labour	Julian Gadd	392	
BNP	Philip Marshall	313	
UKIP	David Warde	243	
UKIP	Tony Wells	214	
UKIP	Paul Newton	210	
Liberal Democrats	George Richardson	204	
Turnout			32.6%
Conservative win (new seat)			
Conservative win (new seat)			
Conservative win (new seat)			

=== Boultham ===
Location of Boultham ward

Boultham
Party	Candidate	Votes	%
Labour	Gary Hewson	875	
Labour	Ralph Toofany	862	
Labour	Richard Coupland	847	
Conservative	Andrew Bradley	597	
Conservative	Adam Green	478	
Conservative	Lynette Slator	473	
BNP	Alwyn Pearce	409	
Liberal Democrats	Lynn Pepper	367	
UKIP	Pat Buss	238	
Socialist	Scott Lumsden	162	
Turnout			36.1%
Labour win (new seat)			
Labour win (new seat)			
Labour win (new seat)			

=== Bracebridge ===
Location of Bracebridge ward

Bracebridge
Party	Candidate	Votes	%
Conservative	Darren Grice	1,189	
Conservative	Hilton Spratt	1,185	
Conservative	Marc Jones	1,075	
Labour	Leslie Burke	530	
Labour	Taylor Buckley	501	
Labour	David Rimmington	458	
Liberal Democrats	David Harby	325	
BNP	Dean Lowther	306	
UKIP	Steven Pearson	204	
Turnout			37.0%
Conservative win (new seat)			
Conservative win (new seat)			
Conservative win (new seat)			

=== Carholme ===
Location of Carholme ward

Carholme
Party	Candidate	Votes	%
Labour	Neil Murray	746	
Labour	Karen Lee	742	
Liberal Democrats	Helen Heath	722	
Labour	Lesley Rose	706	
Liberal Democrats	Charles Shaw	657	
Liberal Democrats	Ross Pepper	592	
Conservative	Daniel Hutchinson	440	
Conservative	Geoffrey Brooking	407	
Conservative	Valerie Kirby	406	
Green	Nicola Watson	316	
BNP	Sarah Booth	156	
UKIP	Christopher Casement	103	
Independent	Frank King	63	
Turnout			33.4%
Labour win (new seat)			
Labour win (new seat)			
Liberal Democrats win (new seat)			

=== Castle ===
Location of Castle ward

Castle
Party	Candidate	Votes	%
Labour	Donald Nannestad	925	
Labour	Loraine Woolley	887	
Labour	Rachel Taylor	865	
Conservative	Anne Duguid	747	
Conservative	Alister Williams	659	
Conservative	Michael Reeve	654	
BNP	Sabrina Fincham	246	
UKIP	Peter Sharpe	235	
Turnout			34.7%
Labour win (new seat)			
Labour win (new seat)			
Labour win (new seat)			

=== Glebe ===
Location of Glebe ward

Glebe
Party	Candidate	Votes	%
Conservative	Charlotte Metcalfe	688	
Labour	Ric Metcalfe	682	
Conservative	David Denman	672	
Conservative	Claire Metcalfe	641	
Labour	Larry Wells	611	
Labour	Malcolm Withers	560	
BNP	Colin Westcott	333	
BNP	Mike Watts	329	
Independent	Roy Harris	222	
UKIP	Bob Turner	174	
UKIP	David Wells	174	
Turnout			34.8%
Conservative win (new seat)			
Labour win (new seat)			
Conservative win (new seat)			

=== Hartsholme ===
Location of Hartsholme ward

Hartsholme
Party	Candidate	Votes	%
Conservative	Ronald Hills	1,043	
Conservative	Geoffrey Kirby	934	
Conservative	Andrew Kerry	930	
Labour	Irene Coupland	409	
Labour	Mandy Buckley-Taylor	399	
Labour	Olwen Hamer	377	
UKIP	Nicola Smith	316	
UKIP	Kenneth Pratt	270	
BNP	Will Buchanan	243	
UKIP	Jamie Corney	223	
Turnout			35.4%
Conservative win (new seat)			
Conservative win (new seat)			
Conservative win (new seat)			

=== Minster ===
Location of Minster ward

Minster
Party	Candidate	Votes	%
Conservative	David Gratrick	970	
Conservative	Yvonne Bodger	944	
Conservative	Sandra Gratrick	909	
Labour	Morris Cookson	832	
Labour	Robert Parker	772	
Labour	Patrick Vaughan	743	
BNP	Tracey Lloyd	274	
UKIP	Nick Smith	232	
Turnout			37.7%
Conservative win (new seat)			
Conservative win (new seat)			
Conservative win (new seat)			

=== Moorland ===
Location of Moorland ward

Moorland
Party	Candidate	Votes	%
Conservative	Oliver Peeke	836	
Conservative	Paul Grice	835	
Conservative	Keith Weaver	835	
Labour	Geoffrey Ellis	712	
Labour	Jeff Boyall	550	
Labour	Lindsey Cawrey	526	
BNP	Geoff Bowden	335	
Liberal Democrats	Jenny Shaw	305	
Turnout			34.4%
Conservative win (new seat)			
Conservative win (new seat)			
Conservative win (new seat)			

=== Park ===
Location of Park ward

Park
Party	Candidate	Votes	%
Labour	Bud Robinson	700	
Labour	David Jackson	666	
Labour	Brent Charlesworth	594	
Liberal Democrats	Heather Quinton	336	
Liberal Democrats	Ryan Cullen	332	
Conservative	Sally-Ann Grice	285	
Liberal Democrats	Stephen Morgan	274	
Conservative	Luke Flanagan	248	
Green	Kenneth Yates	224	
Conservative	Jill Pyle	223	
BNP	Alan Kirk	189	
UKIP	Gordon Smith	112	
Turnout			28.4%
Labour win (new seat)			
Labour win (new seat)			
Labour win (new seat)			
