= Bellamy and Hardy =

Architectural practice in Lincoln, England

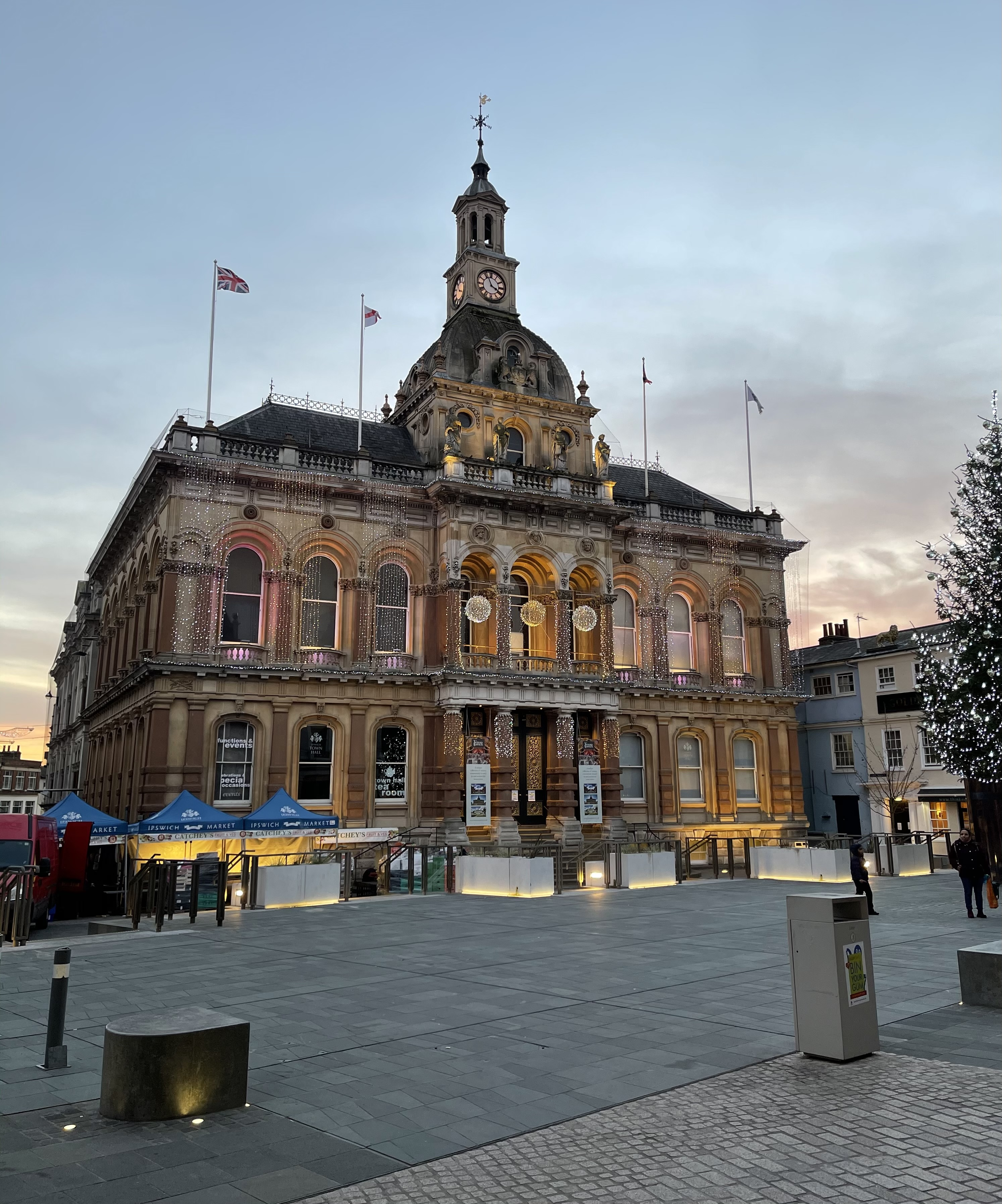
- Ipswich Town Hall, a fine example of their work

Practice information
- Key architects: Bellamy and Hardy
- Partners: Pearson Bellamy and John Spence Hardy
- Founded: June 1853
- Dissolved: 1887
- Location: Lincoln

Significant works and honors
- Buildings: Ipswich Town Hall Grimsby Town Hall, Hull Corn Exchange, Leighton Buzzard Corn Exchange

Bellamy and Hardy was an architectural practice in Lincoln, England, that specialised particularly in the design of public buildings and non-conformist chapels. Pearson Bellamy had established his own architectural practice by 1845 and he entered into a partnership with James Spence Hardy in June 1853. Both partners had previously worked for the Lincoln architect William Adams Nicholson. Hardy was described as "Chief Clerk" to Nicholson. Hardy joined Pearson Bellamy immediately after the sudden death of Nicholson. As all known architectural drawings by the practice are signed Pearson Bellamy, it is likely that Bellamy was the architect and Hardy was the administrator in the practice. The partnership lasted until 1887. Bellamy continued to practise until 1896.

== Architectural practice ==
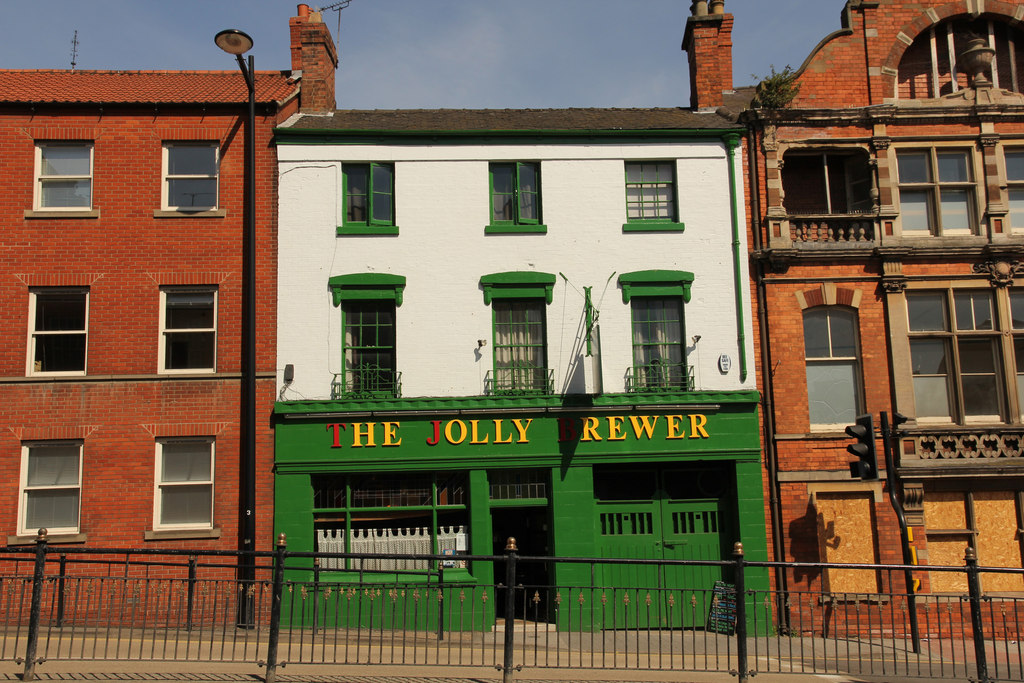
The Jolly Brewer, Broadgate – next to Bellamy and Hardy's Office site

This architectural practice were the designers of a large number of buildings in Lincolnshire and more widely within the British Isles. In 1841 Hardy was working as an assistant to the Lincoln architect William Adams Nicholson, while Bellamy was apprenticed to Nicholson. John Spence Hardy was born in Preston in Lancashire around 1815 and Pearson Bellamy was born in Louth in 1822. Pearson Bellamy completed his articles with Nicholson and then worked as an assistant to architects in Manchester and Liverpool. Bellamy returned to Lincoln, perhaps in 1845, and on 16 July 1845 married Caroline Ann Penistan at St Swithin's Church, Lincoln. In May 1846 Bellamy became a partner with his brother-in-law Michael Penistan in an agricultural engineering business on Broadgate. Bellamy continued with his architectural practice at 11 Broadgate, and the partnership with Penistan was short lived. John Spence Hardy had also left Nicholson's practice and by 1848 he was working with the York architect Richard Hey Sharp. Following the death of Sharp, Hardy sold up the York practice and on 11 June 1853 he formed an architectural practice with Pearson Bellamy in Lincoln. , Their practice moved to 30 Broadgate, Lincoln. In 1851 Pearson Bellamy was living in Melville Street, Lincoln, but probably moved to Carholme Terrace later in that year and was recorded there in 1856. He remained there until after 1872, when it was known as No. 1 Carholme Road, (now the Hollies Hotel). In 1881 he was living with his family at 14 Tentercroft Street and by 1889 he had moved to Weston Lodge, South Park, but by 1896 Pearson Bellamy had moved back to 14 Tentercroft Street. Bellamy and Hardy "Architects and Surveyors" had offices in Melville Street, Lincoln. In 1896 Pearson Bellamy is noted as working by himself at 29, Broadgate, Lincoln. These premises, which have now been re-built were adjacent and on the north side of the Jolly Brewer in Broadgate. Hardy died in November 1892. Pearson Bellamy died in June 1901 at 14 Tentercroft Street.

== Architectural work ==
Nikolaus Pevsner had mixed views about the work of Pearson Bellamy. When discussing the Royal Exchange Offices in Lincoln, he refers to Pearson Bellamy as an underrated architect, which contrasts with his description of Leighton Buzzard Corn Exchange (see below), which he seems to like, but criticises because it is not stylistically correct, calling it "Victorian at its most irresponsible". However, Pevsner considered their cemetery chapels at Loughborough "the best cemetery buildings in the county."

=== Lincoln City Surveyorship ===
Following the Local Government Act 1858, which was adopted by the Corporation of Lincoln in 1866, a local government board was set up. In June 1866 the board voted to appoint a surveyor to supervise sanitary and planning applications for the city. There were applications for the post from Michael Drury, the Corporation Surveyor, Henry Goddard, surveyor to the Lighting and Paving Commissioners, a Mr Betham and Pearson Bellamy. Henry Goddard's application was unexpectedly withdrawn. Bellamy was appointed to the position. From this time Pearson Bellamy seems to have been increasingly occupied by this work in the city, but resigned sometime between 1875 and 1878, by which time he had been replaced by a John James Henderson.

=== Public and commercial buildings ===
==== Burnley, Lancashire ====
- Clock Tower, erected in St James's Street, Burnley. (1859). The clock tower commission was decided following an open competition. 92 entries were received, with the first prize going to Bellamy and Hardy. The clock tower appears to have been removed after World War II.

==== Boston ====
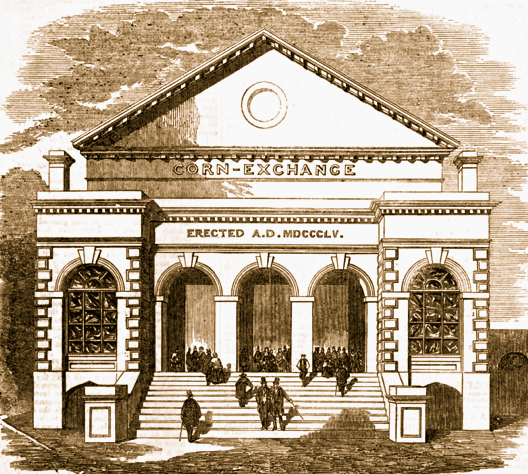
Boston, Lincs. Corn Exchange

- The Boston Corn Exchange. Opened in September 1855. The building of the Atheneum, also by Bellamy and Hardy, commenced almost immediately after the completion of the Corn Exchange. The Corn Exchange was demolished at the same time as the Atheneum.

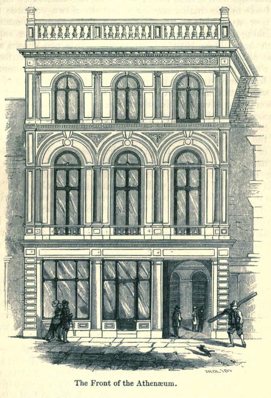
The Atheneum, Boston, Lincolnshire

- The Atheneum, Boston Market Place (1855). Founded in 1851 as a result of the amalgamation of the Mechanic's Institute and the public library. The new building designs were approved on 19 September 1855 when the designs of three different architects were considered. Bellamy and Hardy's design was selected on the basis of cost, which was estimated at £600–650, while Fowler of Louth at £1000 and Micklethwait and Chapman of Grimsby at £800 were considered too expensive. The Atheneum fronted onto the Market Place and stood in front of the Corn Exchange built in the same year. It was demolished when Marks and Spencers was built.

==== Cambridge ====
- Corn Exchange. It was announced in February 1858 that the "new Corn Exchange at Cambridge, ... by Messrs. Bellamy and Hardy, is now so far advanced as to give some idea of what it will be. The space within the walls is 108 feet length, and 49 in breadth. The height of the walls to the springing of the roof will be 25 feet. The roof will be divided into five compartments, and will be principally of glass, The contractors are Messrs. Sharman and Son, of Spalding, the amount being £2750." The location of this corn exchange is unknown and it was replaced by the present Cambridge corn exchange building in 1875–76.

==== Grimsby ====
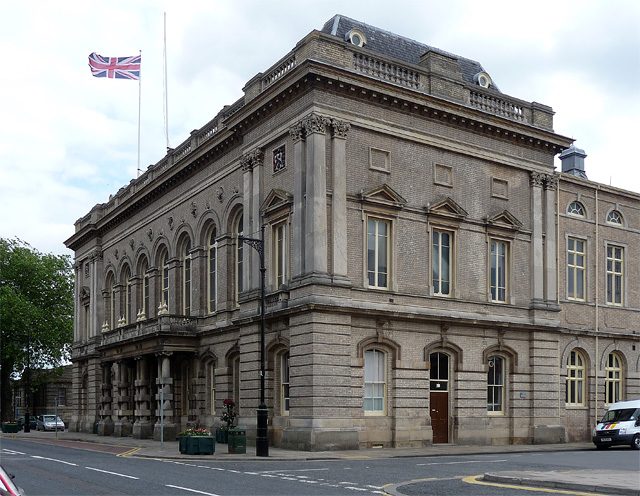
Town Hall, Grimsby

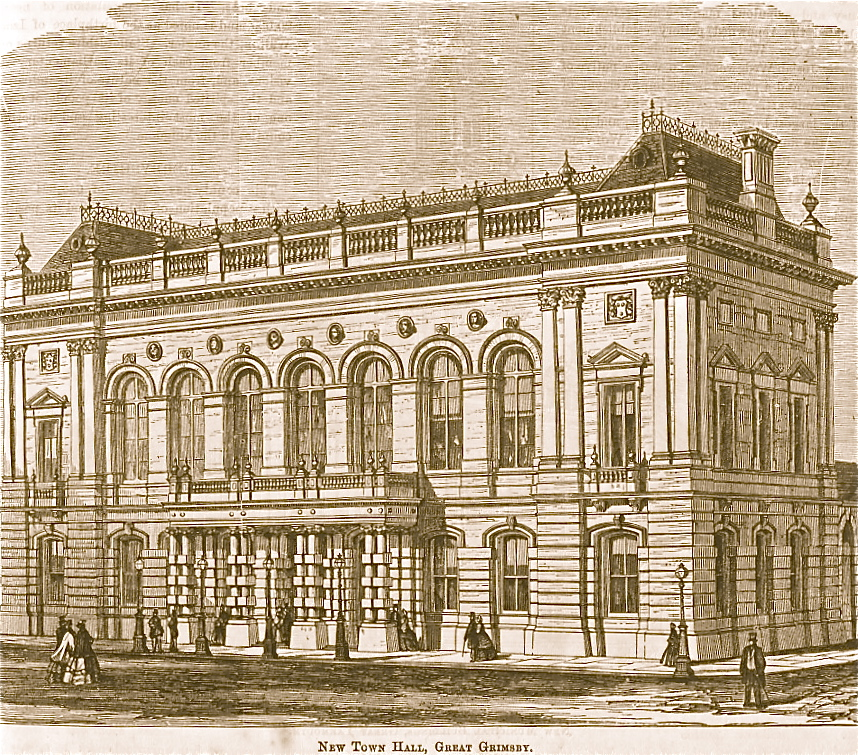
Grimsby Town Hall

- Grimsby Town Hall 1861–1863. Designed with John Giles of London. The work was superintended by James Fowler of Louth. The Doughty Museum and Municipal Offices formed flanking pavilions to the Town Hall. Yellow brick with yellow stone with Italianate details. Set with roundel portraits of the founding figures in Grimsby history; Archbishop Whitgift (born in the town's Old Market Place), Gervase Holles, (a Mayor in 1640, a Royalist, and a local historian), Edward III (who granted land to the town's freemen), and three more recent figures, the Earl of Yarborough, Queen Victoria and Prince Albert. Bellamy also used roundels as a decorative feature on Ipswich Town Hall.

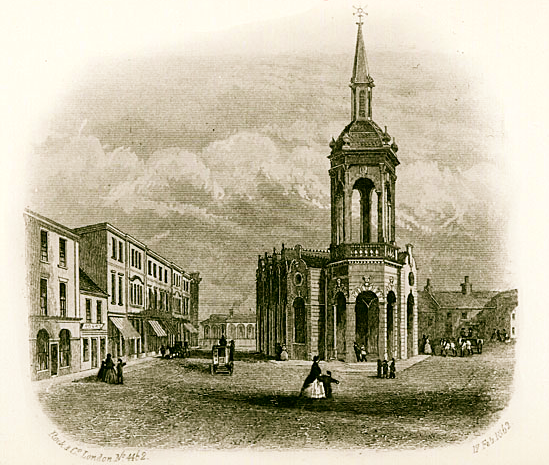
Grimsby Corn Exchange 1862

- Grimsby Corn Exchange. Constructed of red brick and dressed stone. The plans were set in place by Grimsby Borough for the building project in 1855 and £6,000 was approved for the building, land and expenses. Bellamy and Hardy won the open competition for the design and were paid £150 to oversee the building's construction, which cost £3,429, with the balance of the £6,000 going to the previous owner of the site. A civic dinner was held on 6 March 1857 to mark the opening of the Corn Exchange. The building was demolished in 1960.
- The Mechanics Institute, Victoria Street, Grimsby. (1856). "an edifice in of coloured brick, and stone, in the Italian style." Built at the cost of nearly £1,200.

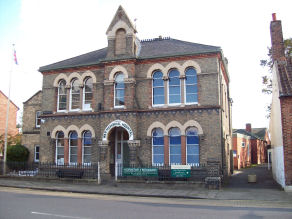
Horncastle War Memorial Hospital -former Dispensary 1866

==== Horncastle ====
- Horncastle, Lincolnshire. The Dispensary, North Street. 1866. Horncastle Public Dispensary was originally founded by Sir Joseph Banks in 1789. Re-built in North Street in 1866, to designs by Bellamy and Hardy, at a cost of £1,026.10s.11d. Converted in 1924 into the War Memorial Hospital. White gault bricks with ashlar and red brick dressings. Welsh slate hipped roof with tall brick stacks to rear. First floor has moulded ashlar cill band with single central window and flanking three light windows with moulded round headed ashlar tops, carved imposts and ashlar round mullions.

==== Hull ====
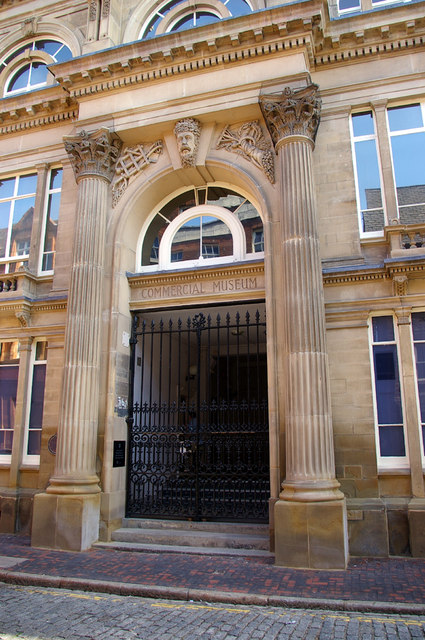
Museum Entrance – Hull Museum, former Corn Exchange

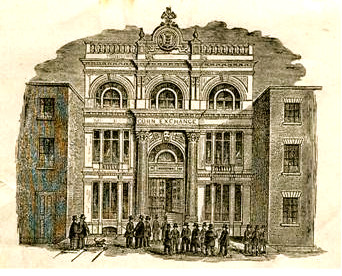
Hull Corn Exchange 1863

- The Corn Exchange, High Street, Hull. Now the Hull and East Riding Museum. Nikolaus Pevsner and David Neave describe this as an "imposing building" of 1856, with a massive Italianate stone front. Three storeys, three bays with a high doorway flanked with Corinthian columns, with a large beaded mask carved on the keystone and agricultural motifs on the spandrels. Tripartite windows to first floor and big semi-circular windows to the upper floor. Cartouche with town arms on parapet. The Corn Exchange incorporated a huge exchange hall spanned by timber trusses supported on carved corbels. The building was little used and in disrepair by 1888. The exchange lost more business in 1904 when the new Corn Market opened in the Market Hall, North Church Side. It closed in 1906 and some of the rooms were used as offices by companies such as the Yorkshire Farmers. During the First World War it was used to house troops. It found a new purpose in 1925 when it became the Museum of Commerce and Transport and then in 1989 the Hull and East Riding Museum.

==== Ipswich ====
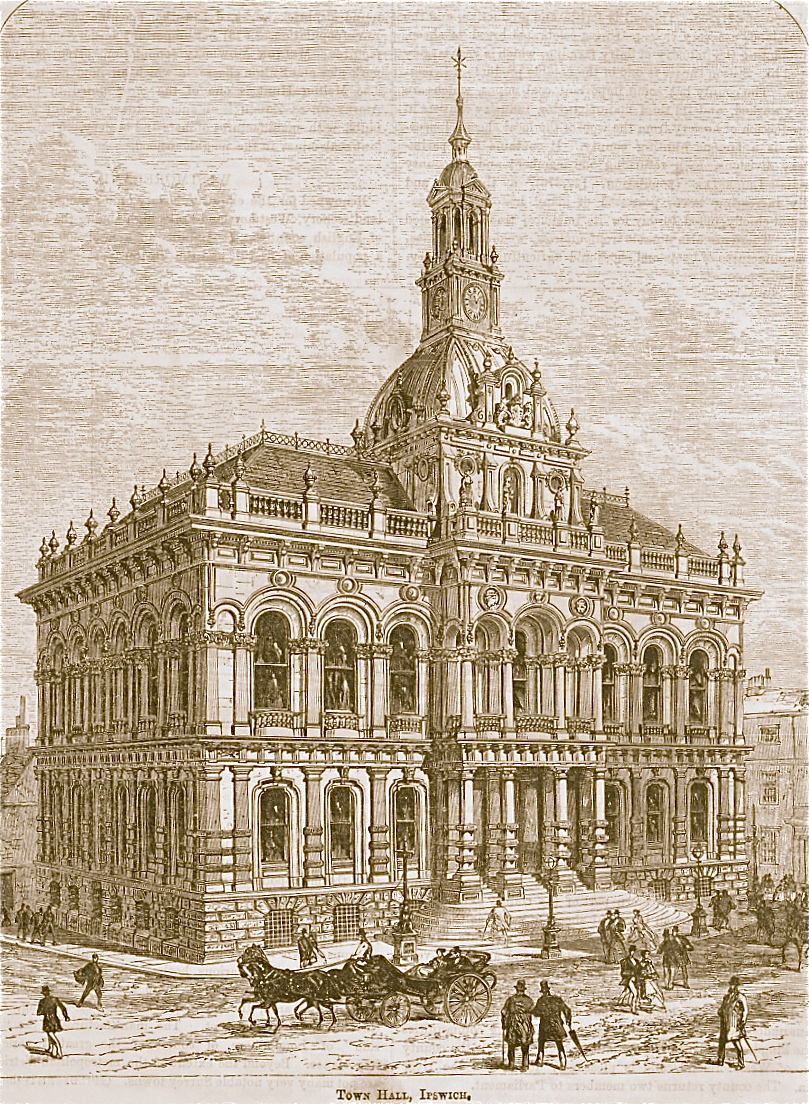
Ipswich Town Hall c. 1867–68

- Ipswich Town Hall, Now an arts centre and events venue; it dates from 1867–1868. Pevsner describes it as "Italianate, with a French pavilion roof over the raised centre, and quite undistinguished". A yellow stone building with pink pilasters, columns and dressings and a balustraded parapet with has four female standing figures representing Commerce, Agriculture, Law and Order and Justice. A stone dome, above, is surmounted by stone clock tower and cupola. The centre portion with three windows projects forward with an arcade of Corinthian columns on the first storey and a Roman Doric colonnade with vermiculated rustication at ground level. In the central portion, below the parapet, are three roundel figure heads of King Richard I, Cardinal Wolsey and King John. King Richard I promised the town its first charter, but died before it was granted. King John granted the town's charter and Cardinal Wolsey was the most famous person in Ipswich's history. At the time the foundation stone was laid in April 1866, it was described "as being in the Venetian School and a combination of the Palace Rezzonio, with some others" and "A pleasing effect will be gained by the introduction of red Mansfield stone for the plinth of the building, and the columns and the pilasters throughout giving varied and warm tone to the whole. The basement story will contain a complete police establishment with cells, drilling shed, engine house, kitchen, office for weights and measures, and private entrance and stairs for the council. The ground story will comprise spacious entrance hall in the centre attained by flight of stone steps. To the left is grand staircase, to of red Mansfield stone, immediately opposite the session court, and the magistrates room". It was estimated that the building costs would be £11,750.

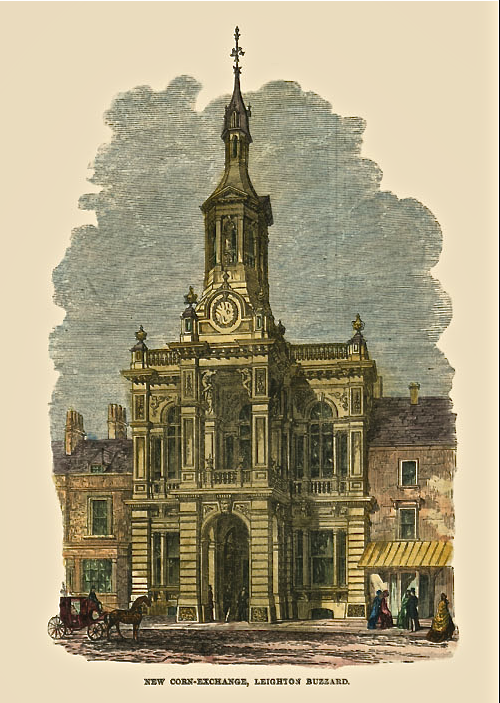
Leighton Buzzard Corn Exchange 1862-3

==== Leighton Buzzard ====
- Leighton Buzzard, Corn Exchange, Lake Road, 1862. According to Pevsner; "Victorian at its most irresponsible. Gay and vulgar, with two two-storeyed middle porch adorned with atlantes and caryatids. The style is a kind of dissolute Renaissance". The Illustrated London News of 23 May 1863 described the Exchange as "a very handsome stone structure, situated in a commanding position, at one end of the market-place, with a good frontage. The Exchange-hall is spacious, and decorated with Ionic pilasters, cornice, and recessed, arched windows at the sides; the ceiling is formed into sunk coffers by enriched stiles, supported by coved ribs...... The design throughout is chaste and original, the front being designed in the modern Italian style of architecture, and consists of two stories of three light Venetian windows." The cost of site and buildings was about £7500. It later was used as a cinema, and in 1932 the spire above the portico became unsafe and was taken down. The Exchange was demolished c.1960.

==== Lincoln ====
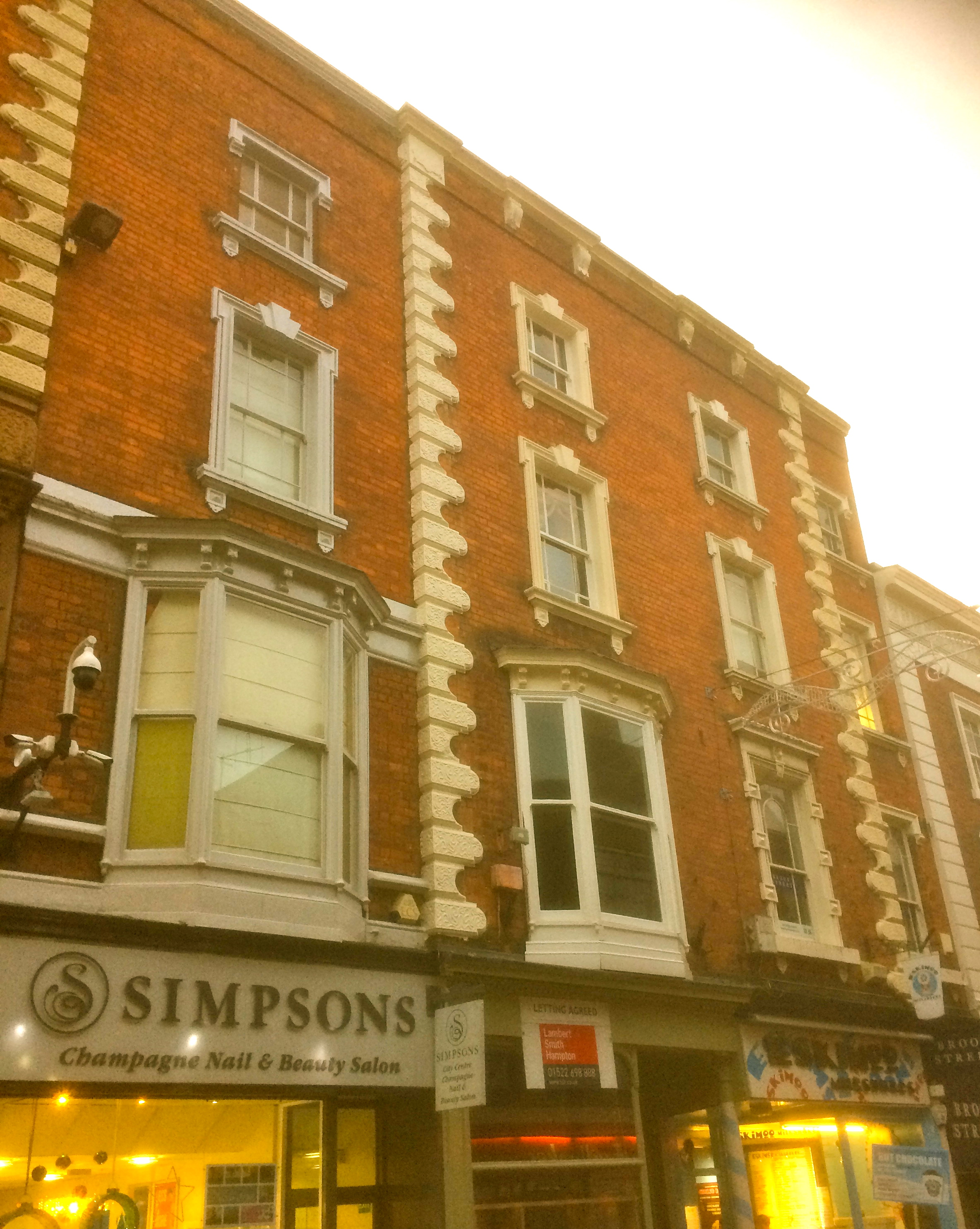
3 & 5 Guildhall Street, Lincoln, 1847-9.

- Shopping development for Henry Moss, Draper and Mercer, on part of the site of the City Hotel (1847–1849). Corner site, where the High Street meets Guildhall Street, Lincoln. Four-storey building with three bays facing the High Street and ten bays facing Guildhall Street. Elizabethan or Jacobethan style. The building was later occupied by Hepworths and converted into a bank in 1893 by William Watkins. Watkins (or his son) refaced the upper part of the building and added a recessed tower on the corner. The exterior walls and the ground and first floors were removed, and the stone facade and strong-rooms were inserted. The building was further extended in the same style in 1923 and 1926 on the High Street frontage. This building is now the HSBC bank. No.3 and No.5, shops on Guildhall Street have survived largely intact, showing Pearson Bellamy's original detailing, with red brick facing and vermiculated rustication.

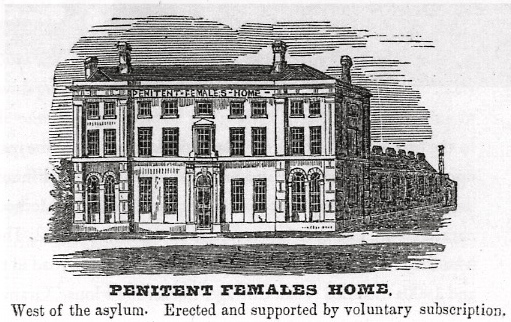
Female Penitents institution, Lincoln

- The Female Penitents Institution, Carline Road 1850. By Pearson Bellamy. For fallen women. For "the moral reformation and religious instruction of unfortunate females". The building was sited on Carline Road, on the south side of the Lincoln workhouse. The foundation stone for the new building was laid on 2 May 1850 "with Masonic Honours" by the Earl of Yarborough. An institutional-looking building in brick with stone dressings. The building was three storeys high and nine bays wide. Four tall pilasters to cornice and parapet. Arched doorway with double pilasters. Stone stringcourse at first floor level. In 1936 the building was known as Belle Vue House and was used as an Approved school for girls. This ceased in 1949 and the building became the offices of the East Midlands Gas Board. It was demolished sometime after 1973.
- Lincoln & Lindsey Bank, 19 Saltergate, Lincoln (1878). Bellamy and Hardy provided plans for the extension and modernisation of the Bank building and the work was carried out by the builder George Morgan. However, the bank moved to the corner of the High Street and Corporation Street in 1893 and is now the HSBC.

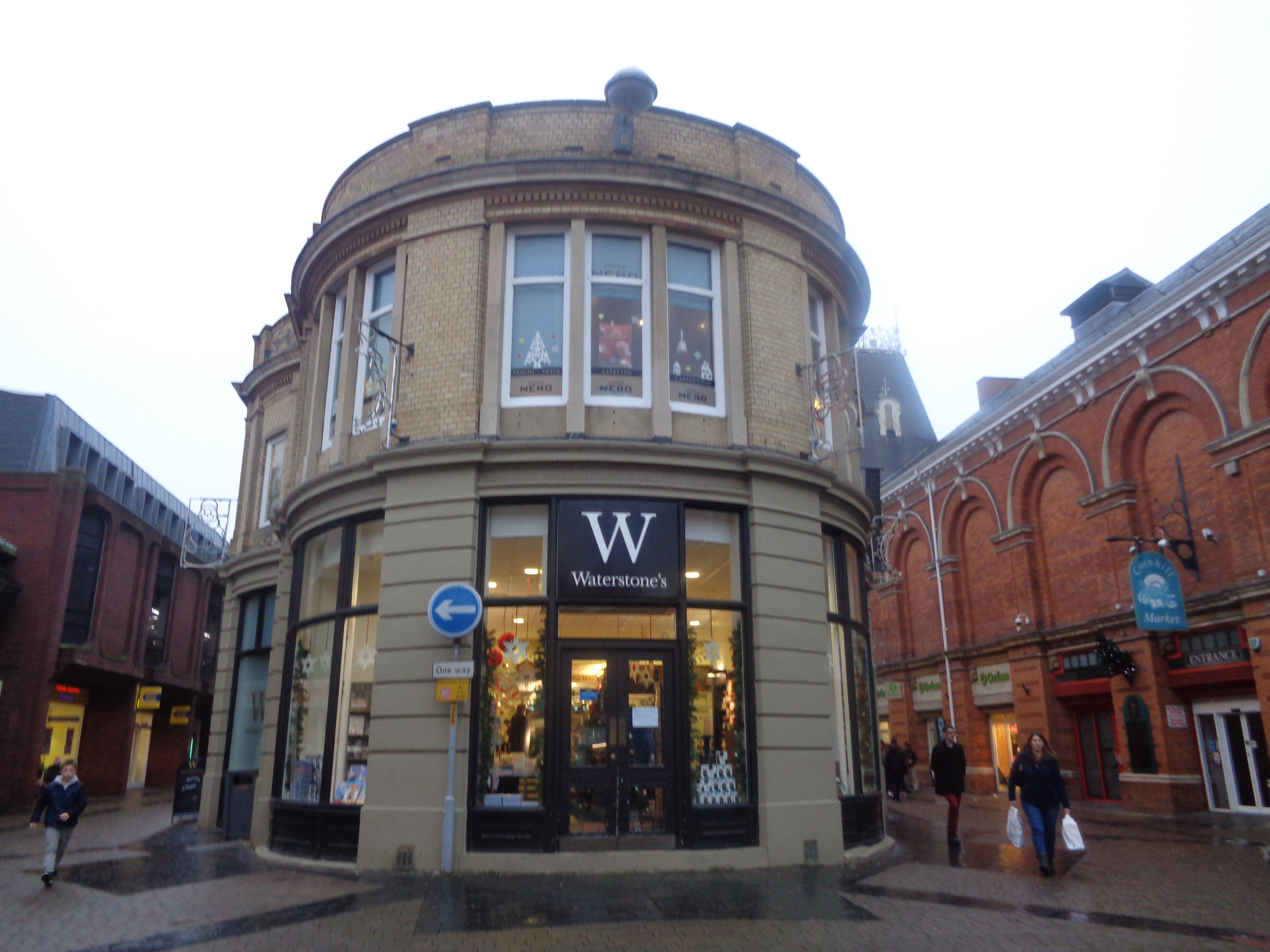
Cornhill shopping arcade, now Waterstones

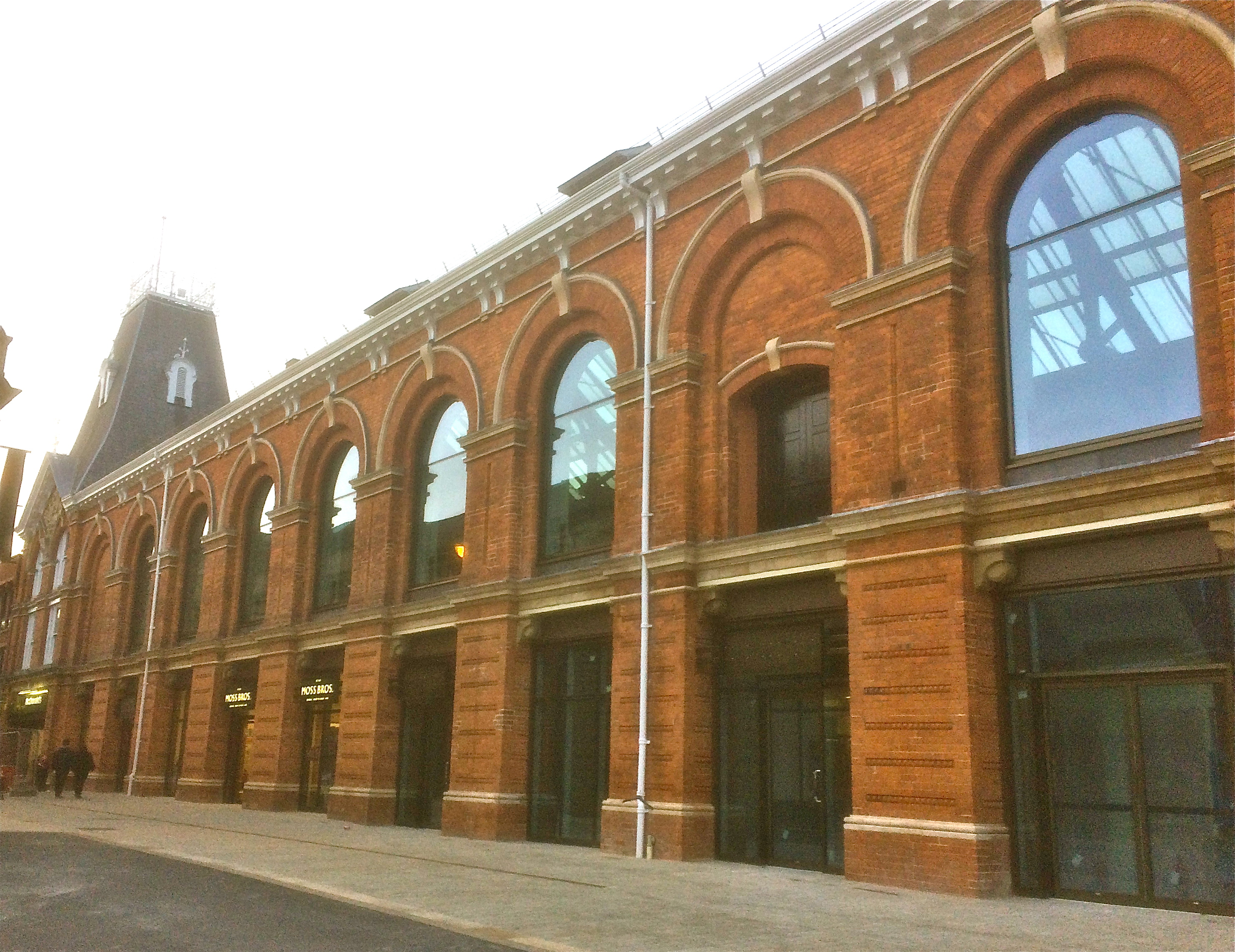
Corn Exchange, Lincoln, Restored facade with plate glass windows 2017

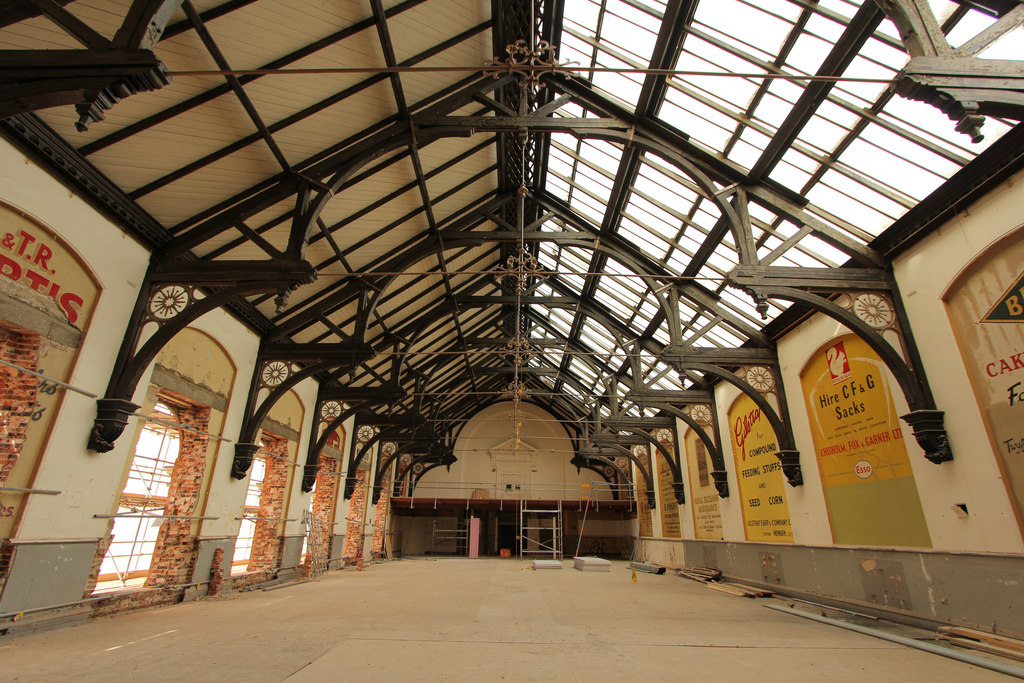
Corn Exchange redevelopment showing hammerbeam roof

- Exchange Arcade, Lincoln, Cornhill, Lincoln. Following the construction of the second corn exchange, in 1882, the back portion of William Adams Nicholson's original Corn Exchange – until recently Waterstones was totally rebuilt. It then became an arcade of 15 shops with a rounded eastern end.
- Corn Exchange, Lincoln. Corn Hill: Sincil Street. 1879. This replaced the earlier Corn Exchange which had now insufficient room for all the market traders. As originally designed the Corn Exchange was on the first floor and the ground floor was an open area used by other market traders. Red brick with round arched panels. It has a French mansard roof, typical of Bellamy and Hardy's work, with ironwork cresting. Inside, on the first floor, a large room, which was the main trading floor, has an impressive hammerbeam roof. While the building was also used for other purposes, trading in corn continued until 1984. Renovation in 2017 has seen the insertion of large plate glass windows into the arched brick arcades on the south and east sides of the trading floor.

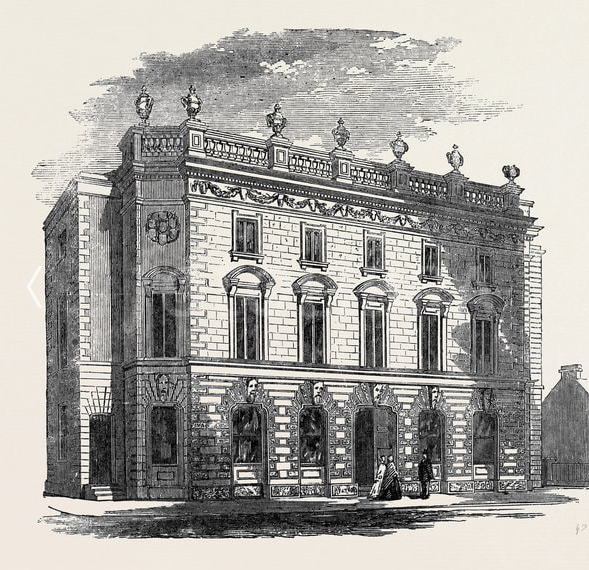
Midland Counties Insurance, Silver Street, Lincoln

- Royal Exchange Offices, Silver Street, Lincoln. (1857) (Demolished c.1968, and regarded by Pevsner as a major loss). Italianate palazzo style. Formerly the Midlands Counties Insurance. Enrichments of vermiculation, rustication, grotesque masks and swags. Surmounted by baluster arcading and finials.

==== Long Sutton ====
- Long Sutton Market House and Corn Exchange, 9–11 Market Street, 1857. Large two-storey red-and-yellow-brick corn exchange. Four bays with arched windows on the first floor, with stone pediments on scroll brackets. The lower floor is now filled in with arched windows. The windows are surrounded by red brick, which contrasts with brown and yellow brick. After the first World War it became the Exchange Garage and later a stonemasons workshop. In 1999 it was acquired by the South Holland District Council and it has subsequently been renovated.

==== Loughborough ====
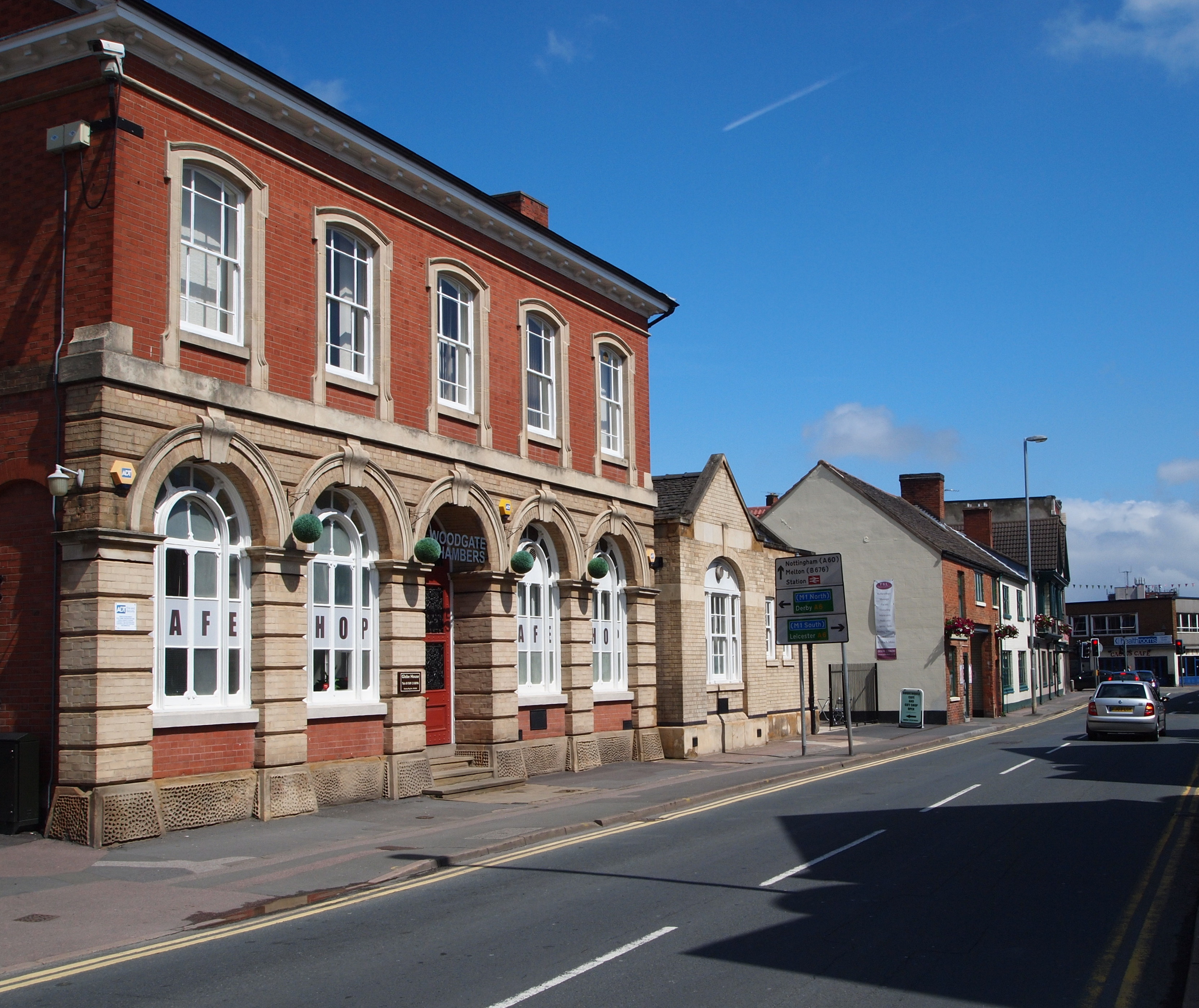
Old Police Station and Magistrates Courts, Loughborough, Leics (Woodgate Centre) 1859

- Loughborough Police Station (1859). This is probably the building that survives as part of the Woodgate centre. The Loughborough Monitor reported on 10 February 1859 that "the designs for these buildings were, on Thursday last, submitted for consideration by the Committee of management. Twelve had been sent in, out of which, one by Messrs Bellamy and Hardy of Lincoln, (the Architects of the Loughborough Cemetery) was selected for recommendation to the Quarter Sessions."
- Loughborough Savings Bank (1861). Bellamy and Hardy advertised for contractors for the erection of a new bank building for the Committee of the Loughborough Savings Bank in January 1861. The site was to be on the corner of Baxter Gate with Mill Street The Savings Bank was closed in July 1888

==== Louth ====
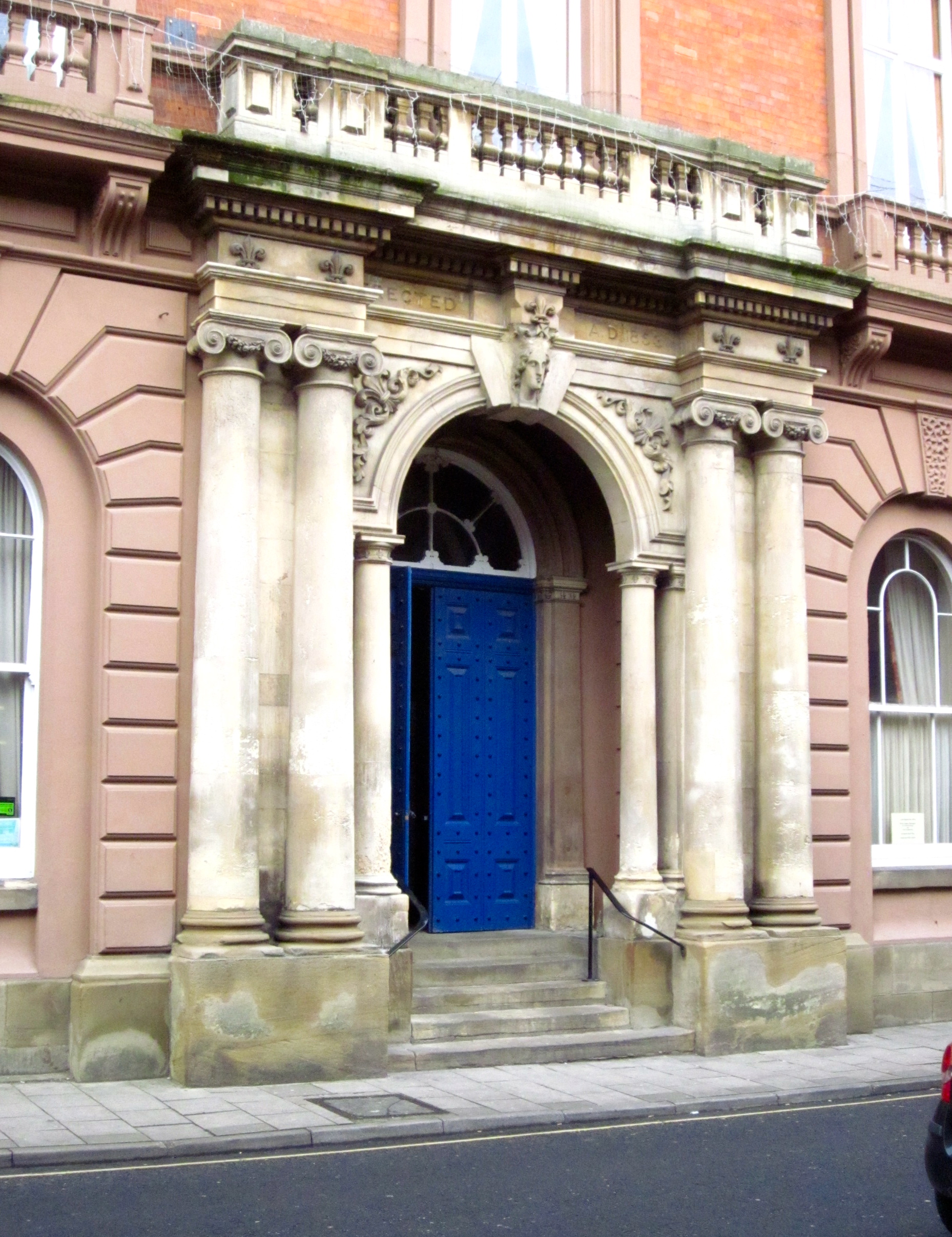
Louth Town Hall, Entrance

- Louth Town Hall, Eastgate 1853–1854. A massive building in Italian Palazzo style. Three storeys high and seven bays long. The entrance has paired Ionic capitals with a balcony above. Above this are cornices with a finialled balustrade. The columns and door surrounds are of Caen Stone.

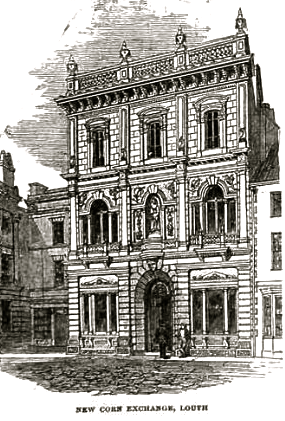
Louth Corn Exchange from the Illustrated London News, 7 January 1854.

- Corn Exchange, Market Place. By Pearson Bellamy 1853–1855. Described by Pevsner in 1964 as "wonderfully decayed" with its facade looking like "a rotting cadaver". Italianate, with a statue of Ceres in the middle. It was demolished in 1981 as the stone facade had reached an advanced state of decay.

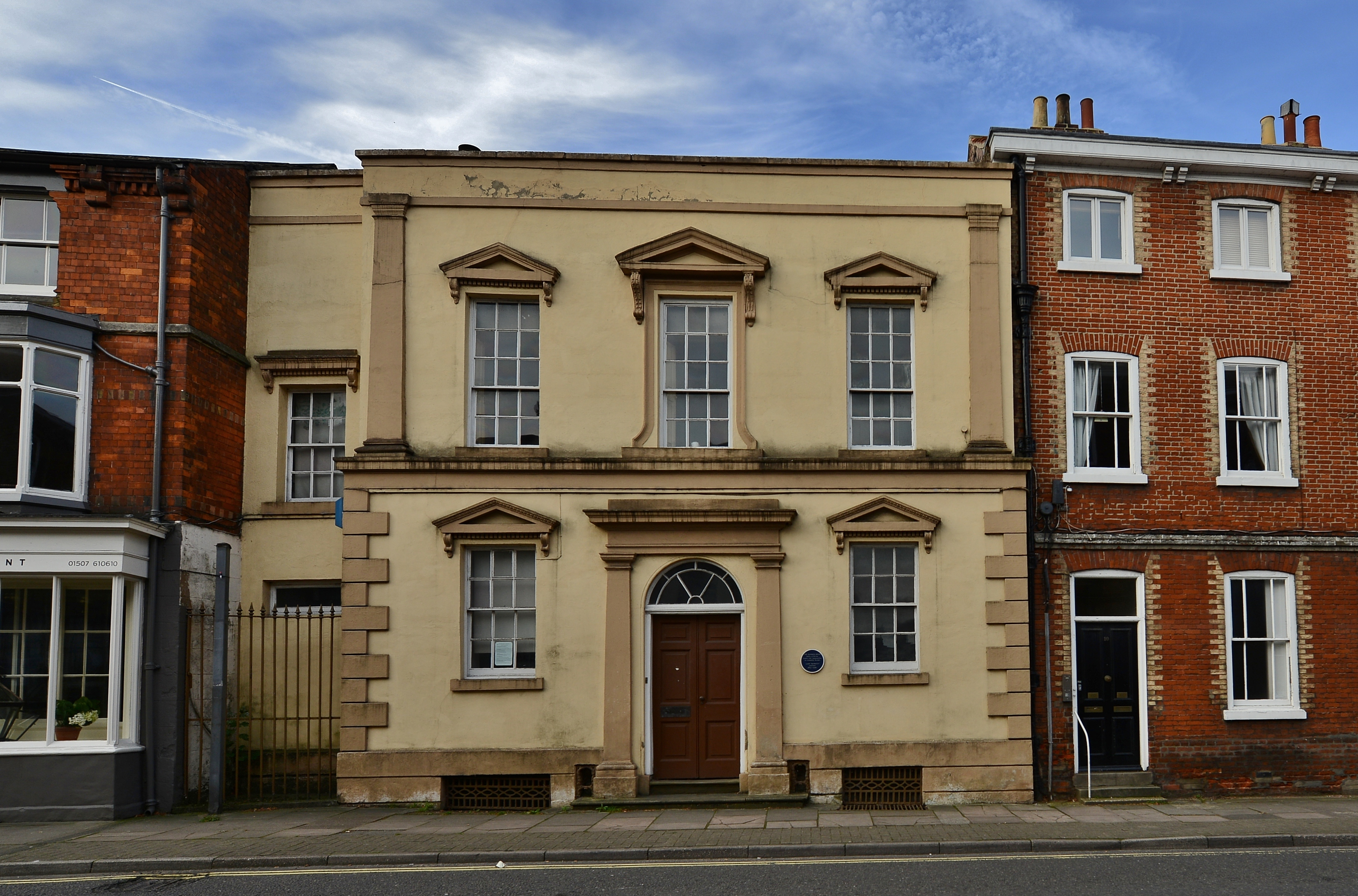
Louth- The Mansion House, Louth

- The Mansion House, Louth, while generally considered to be mid-18th century was extensively remodelled by Bellamy and Hardy in 1853. The Lincolnshire Chronicle records "The interior of the Mansion-house being at present scaffolded, in consequence of the alterations, it would be premature to give an opinion on the probable appearance of the building with the new lights in the roof. The public may be satisfied, however, that it will not be unworthy of its designers, Messrs. Bellamy and Hardy, the architects, under whose superintendence the work is being carried out." William Brown recorded the Mansion House, which at that time was the Louth Mechanics Institute, was "entirely new faced", the work being undertaken by John Dales, presumably the contractor for the work. A lantern tower was also added to the roof.

==== Market Rasen, Lincolnshire ====
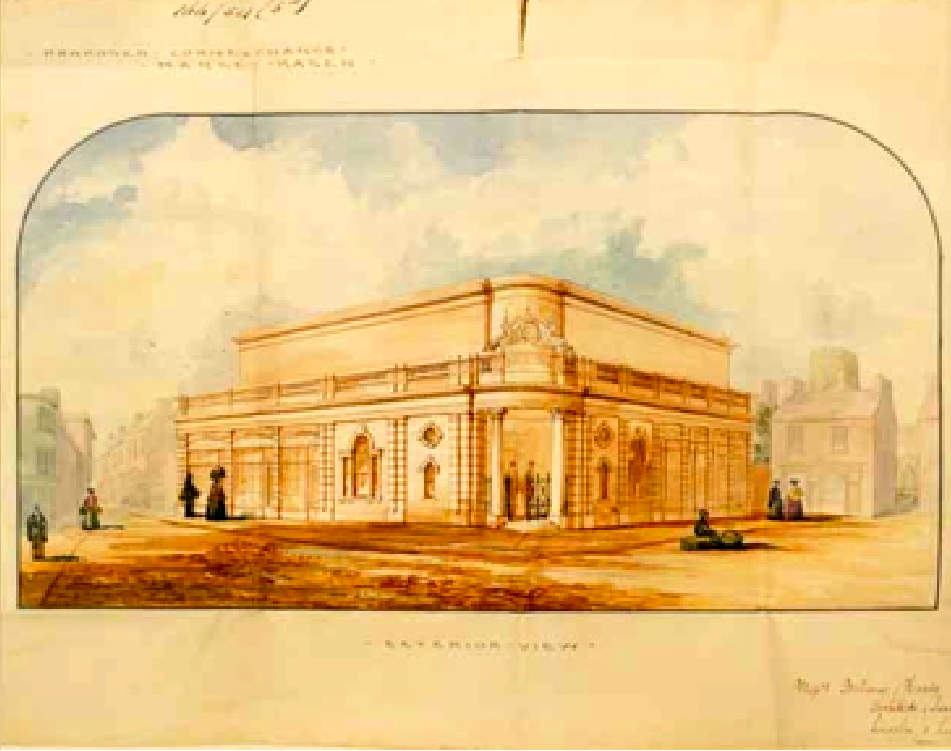
Market Rasen Corn Exchange

- Corn Exchange on the corner of the Market Place with the High Street. Market Rasen had two corn exchanges. Two sites were selected and building went ahead with Queen Street Market Hall, designed by Henry Goddard of Lincoln in 1854. A rival faction then went ahead at the same time with a Market Hall designed by Bellamy and Hardy, and the original drawing for this survives. The drawing shows a building with a corner portico and Doric columns and Venetian windows on two sides of the building. The building was modified when built and there was an open cupola over the portico. This building opened in September 1854. The two corn exchanges were merged in 1856 and the Market Place building became a Market Hall. For a time it was used as a Town Hall and in 1914 it was converted into the Picturedrome cinema. It was demolished in 1960.

==== Retford ====
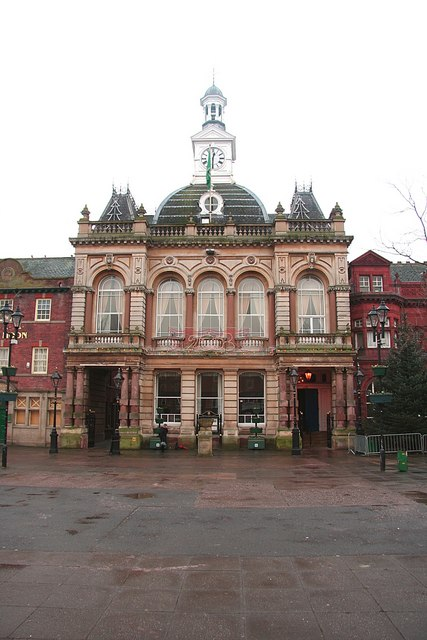
Retford Town Hall. 1866-8

- Retford Town Hall (1866–1868) Pevsner was somewhat scathing of the Town Hall in Retford, which is in a Francoise 1 style. He says it is "without any of the Victorian qualities we appreciate today: a bad mansard roof and a bad lantern". The Builder (October 1867) uses the building as an example of an unsatisfactory result of a building competition, much preferring the Gothic revival design that had been submitted by the Bristol architects Godwin and Crisp. The site was purchased in 1864 and was followed by an architectural competition for which there were 18 entrants. Bellamy and Harding were selected from the shortlist. Work started in 1866 and was completed in 1867. The architects building costs were £7,110. The building was designed to house a Court held in the main hall, a Council Room, a committee and retiring room, Town Clerk's office and Muniment Room, a hall-keeper's residence, kitchens, Corn Exchange and a Butter, Poultry Market and Shambles or meat market. The local press liked the design and it was variously described as "Italian style, Italian Renaissance, Romanesque, and Palladian" in character. The side roofs are mansard pavilions, a French feature which appeared in England in the 1860s at Bishop Auckland Town Hall. The Court-house was replaced in the 1930s and the Shambles and Corn Exchange were demolished about 1980.

==== St Neots ====
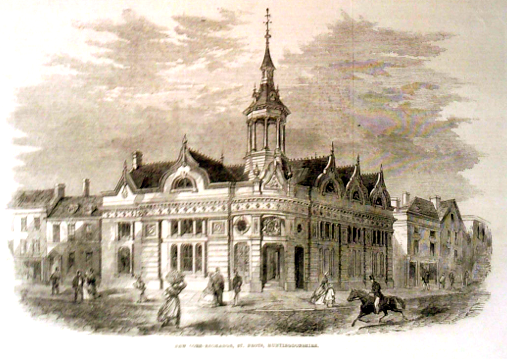
St Neots Corn Exchange 1863-5

- St Neots, Corn Exchange, Corner of South Street with High Street. 1863-5. "Yellow brick with rounded corner and jolly cast-ironwork", Corner of High Street and South Street. Constructed in 1865. According to the Illustrated London News the architect was Pearson Bellamy, where it is described as being built in the '"Elizabethen style". In 1915 the building was purchased by C. A. James, landlord of the Bridge Hotel, who opened it as a cinema. The building caught fire in 1929 and the cupola fell down. It was refurbished and renamed the Pavilion Cinema, until 1969, when the whole building was demolished.

==== Central Market, Halkett Place, St Helier, Jersey ====
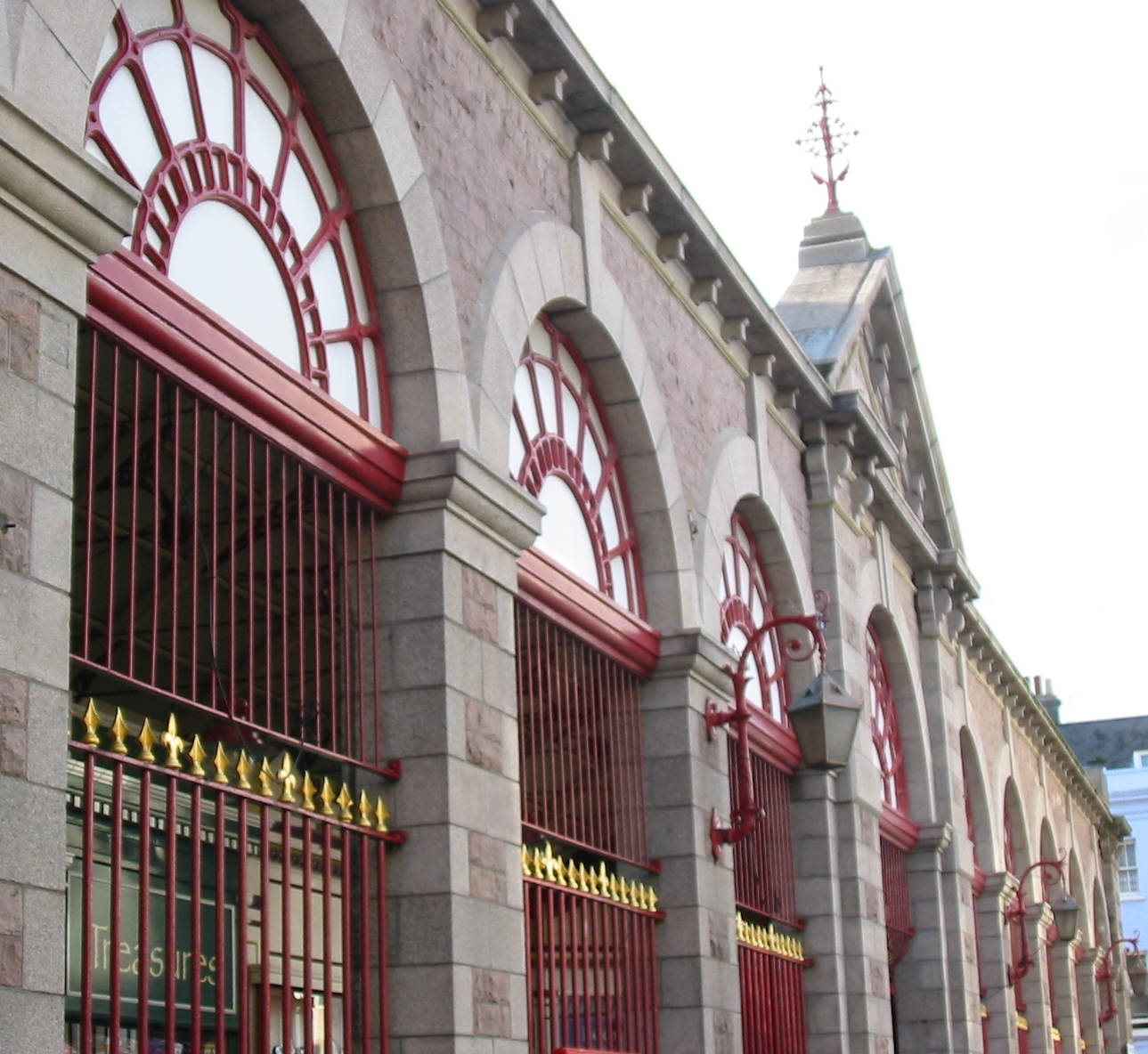
Central Market, St Helier

- Central Market, Halkett Place, St Helier, Jersey. (1882) Appears to have been jointly designed by Thomas William Helliwell of Brighouse, Yorkshire and Bellamy and Hardy. The interior layout of the stalls and cast metalwork was probably taken from Helliwell's plan, but the exterior detailing appears to be largely by Bellamy and Hardy. Fronting Beresford Street and Halkett Place. Approved by the Markets Committee of the Jersey States in May 1880 at the estimated cost of £11,650.

==== Spalding, Lincolnshire ====
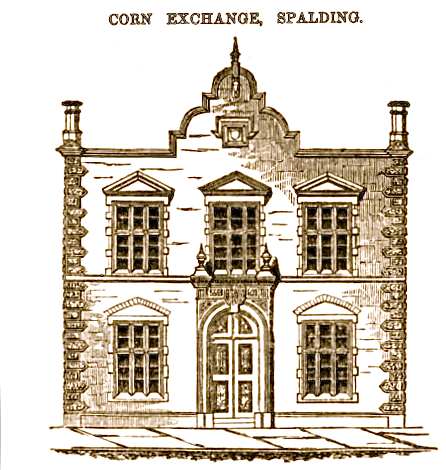
Spalding Corn Exchange 1855

- Spalding Corn Exchange. 1855-6. This was built in the style of "Elizabeth". Pevsner in 1964 described it as "Jacobean, three bays, with brick with shaped gable". Demolished in 1972 and replaced by the unsatisfactory South Holland Centre, which in turn has been demolished and replaced.

==== Wellingborough, Northamptonshire ====
- Wellingborough Corn Exchange (1858). Competition won by Bellamy and Hardy. It was demolished in 1958.

==== Wisbech ====
- Wisbech, Isle of Ely. A Corn Exchange, which still stands, was built behind the earlier Exchange/Town Hall building 1857–58. Sharman and Son, of Spalding, undertook the construction for the sum of £2,750. This amount was raised by 800 shares at £5 each, Richard Young (MP) being the largest shareholder in the Wisbech Corn Exchange company. With Mr. Yeoman as Clerk of works, building commenced in October 1857. The Exchange was described as 109 feet long, by 49 feet wine; the style (if any) Italian, with arched glass roof.

=== Public buildings by Bellamy and Hardy ===
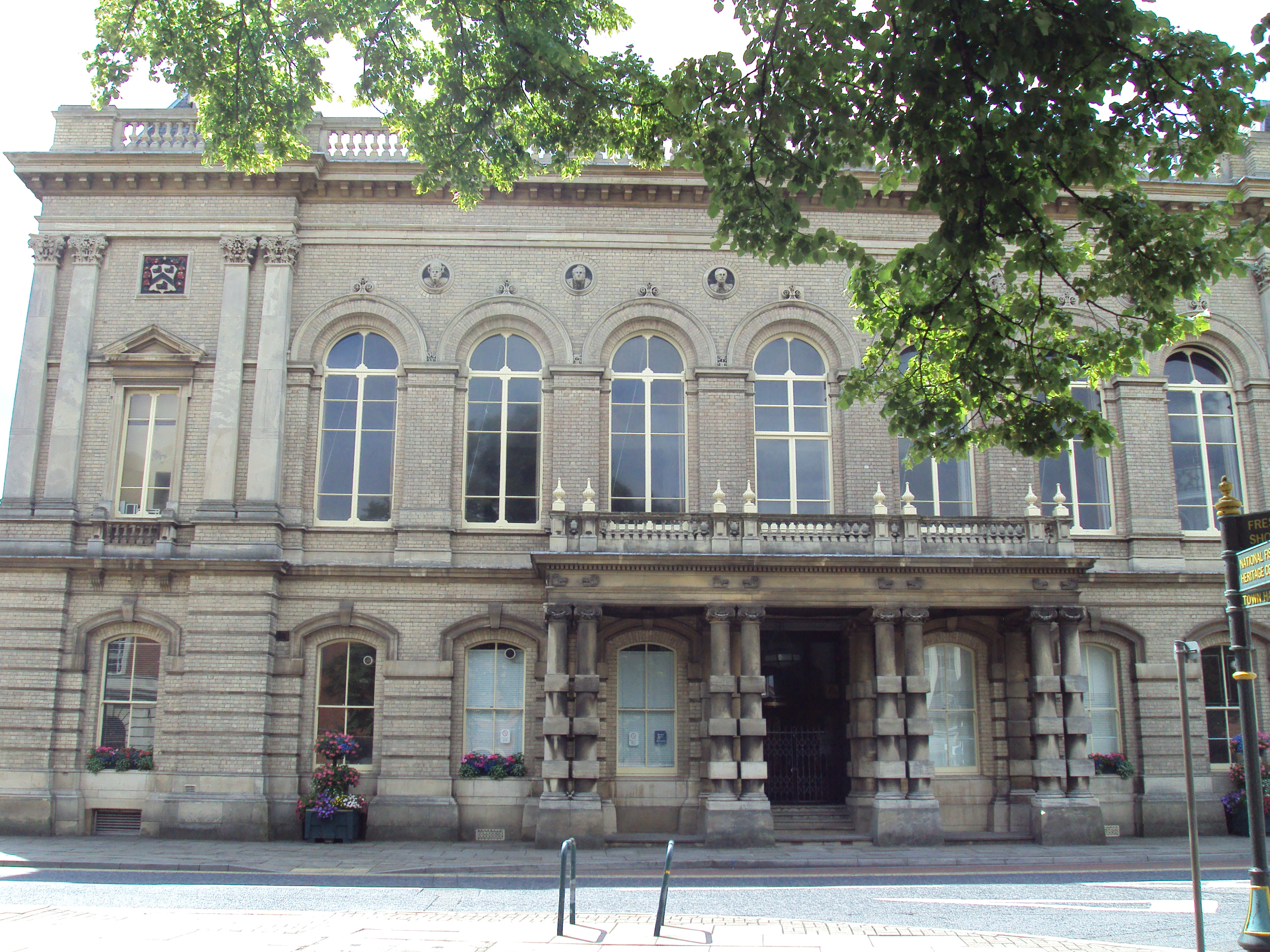
Grimsby Town Hall

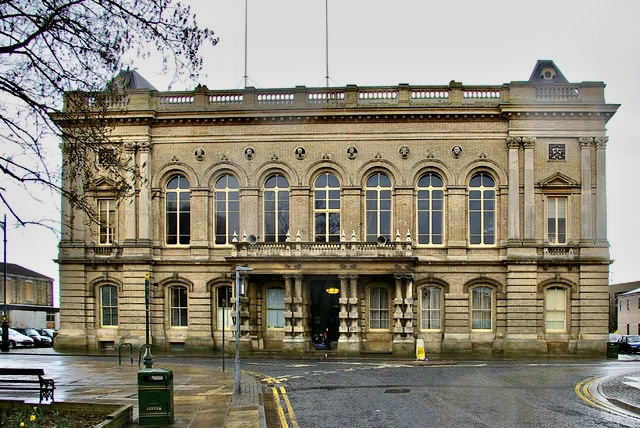
Grimsby Town Hall

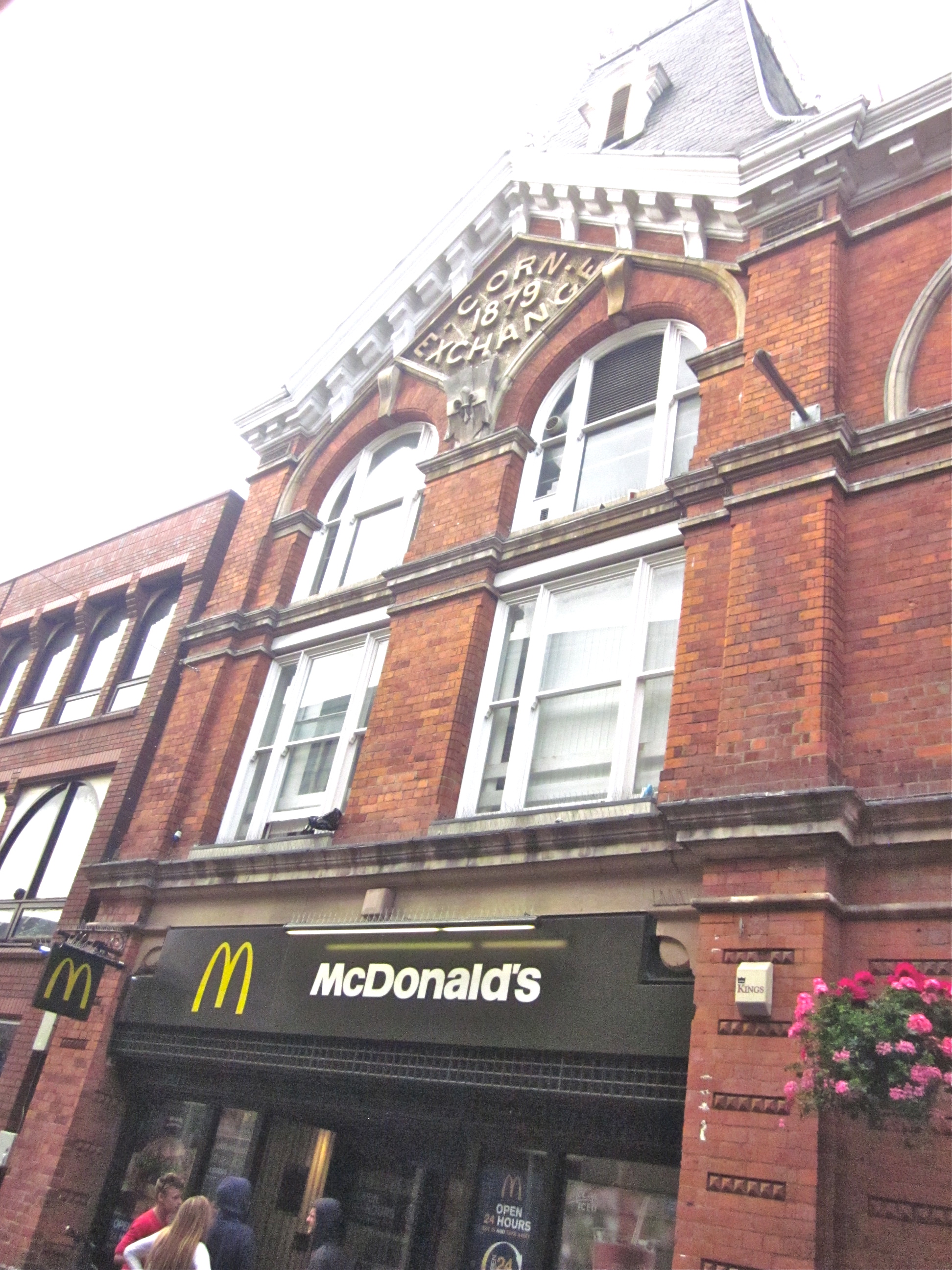
Corn Exchange, Lincoln

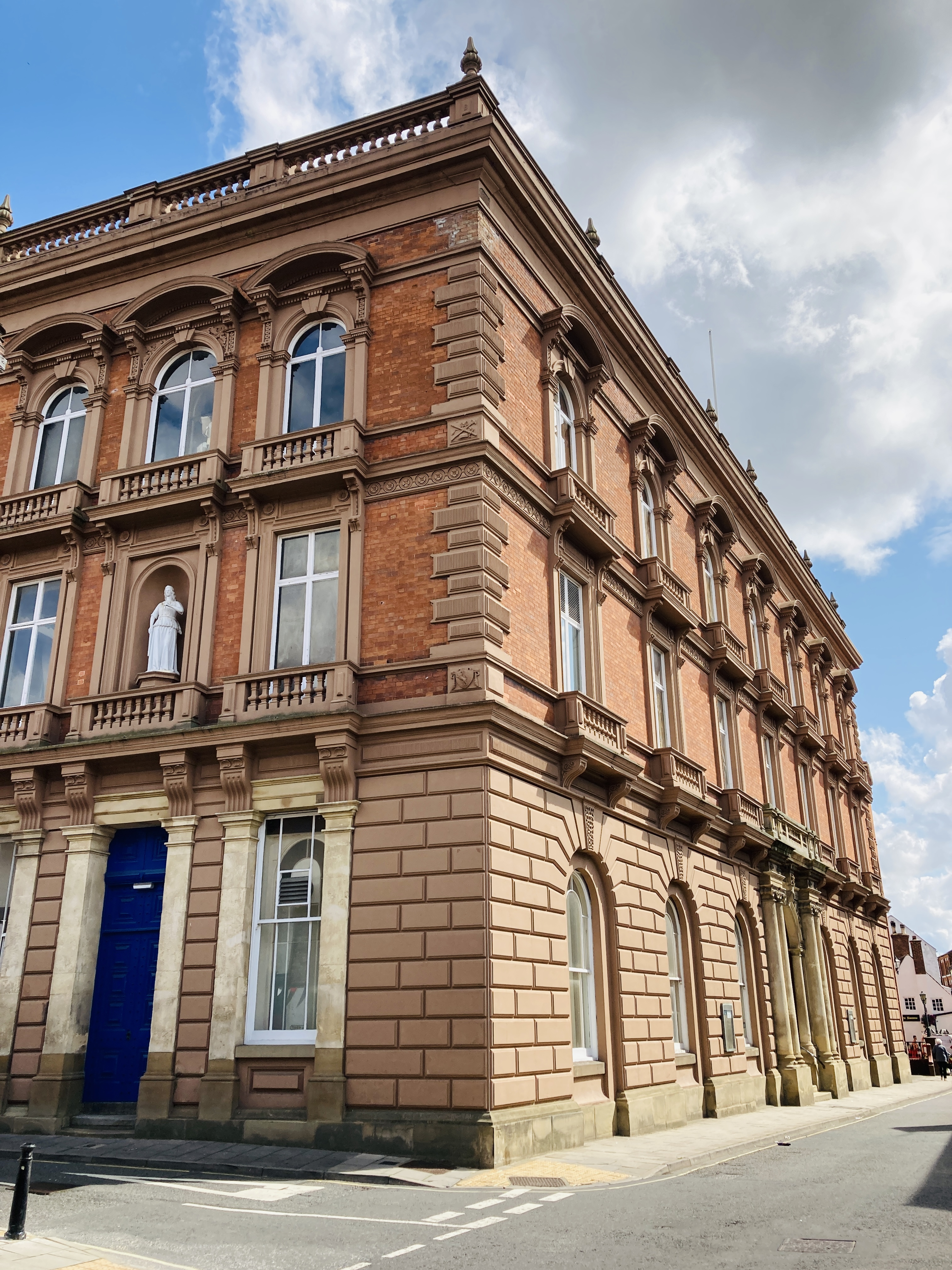
Louth Town Hall

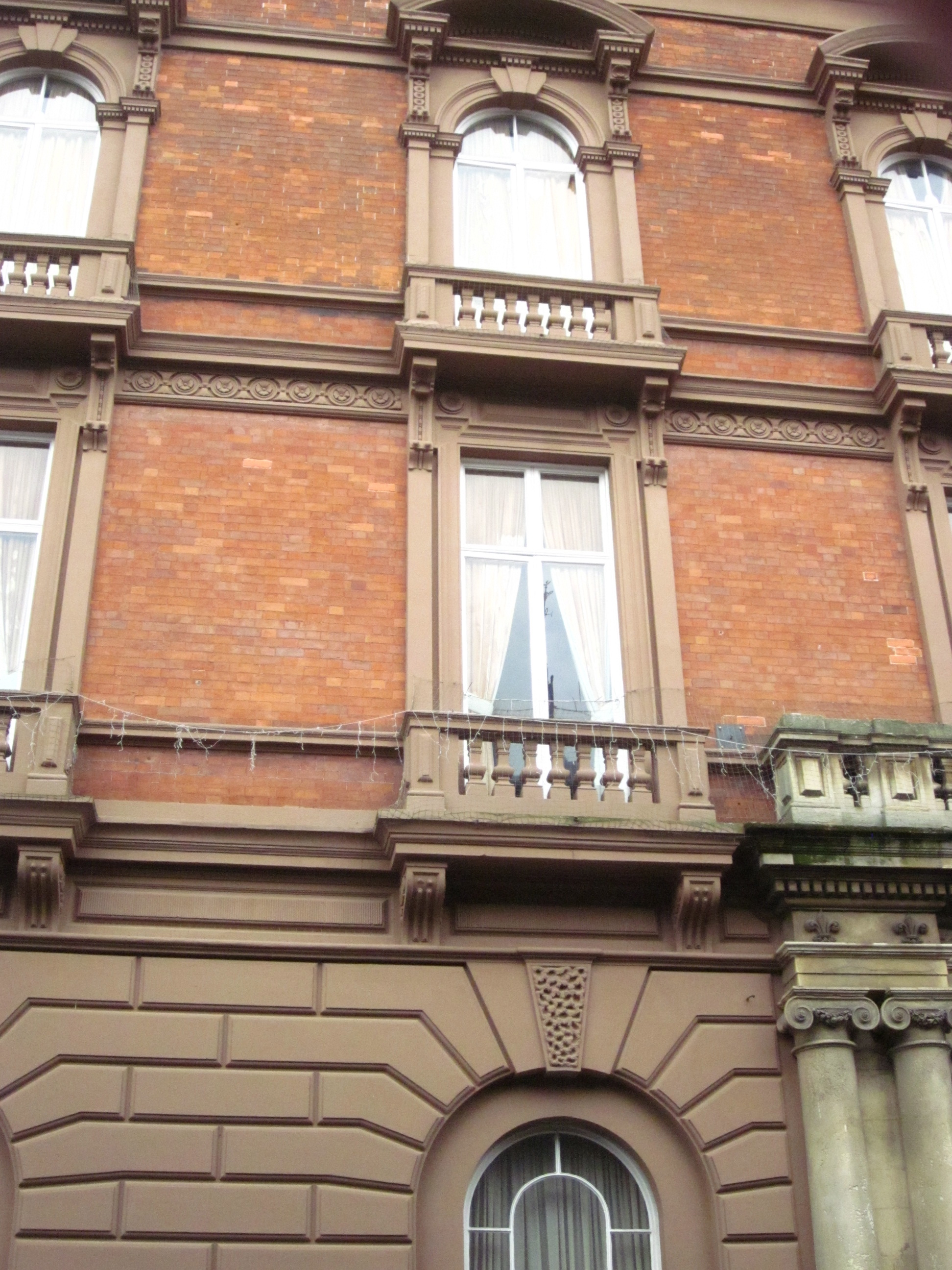
Louth Town Hall, Windows and facade

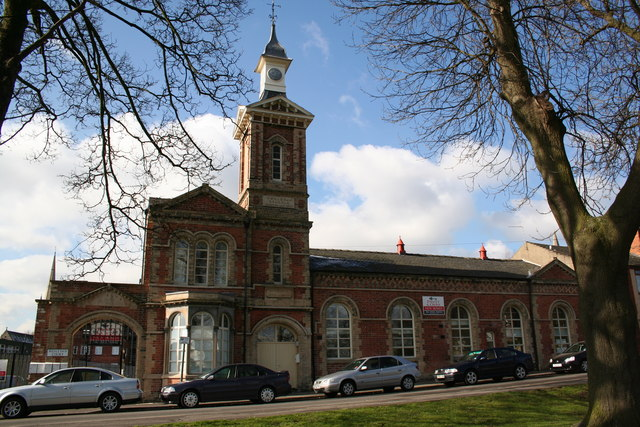
Wesleyan Day School, Rosemary Lane, Lincoln.

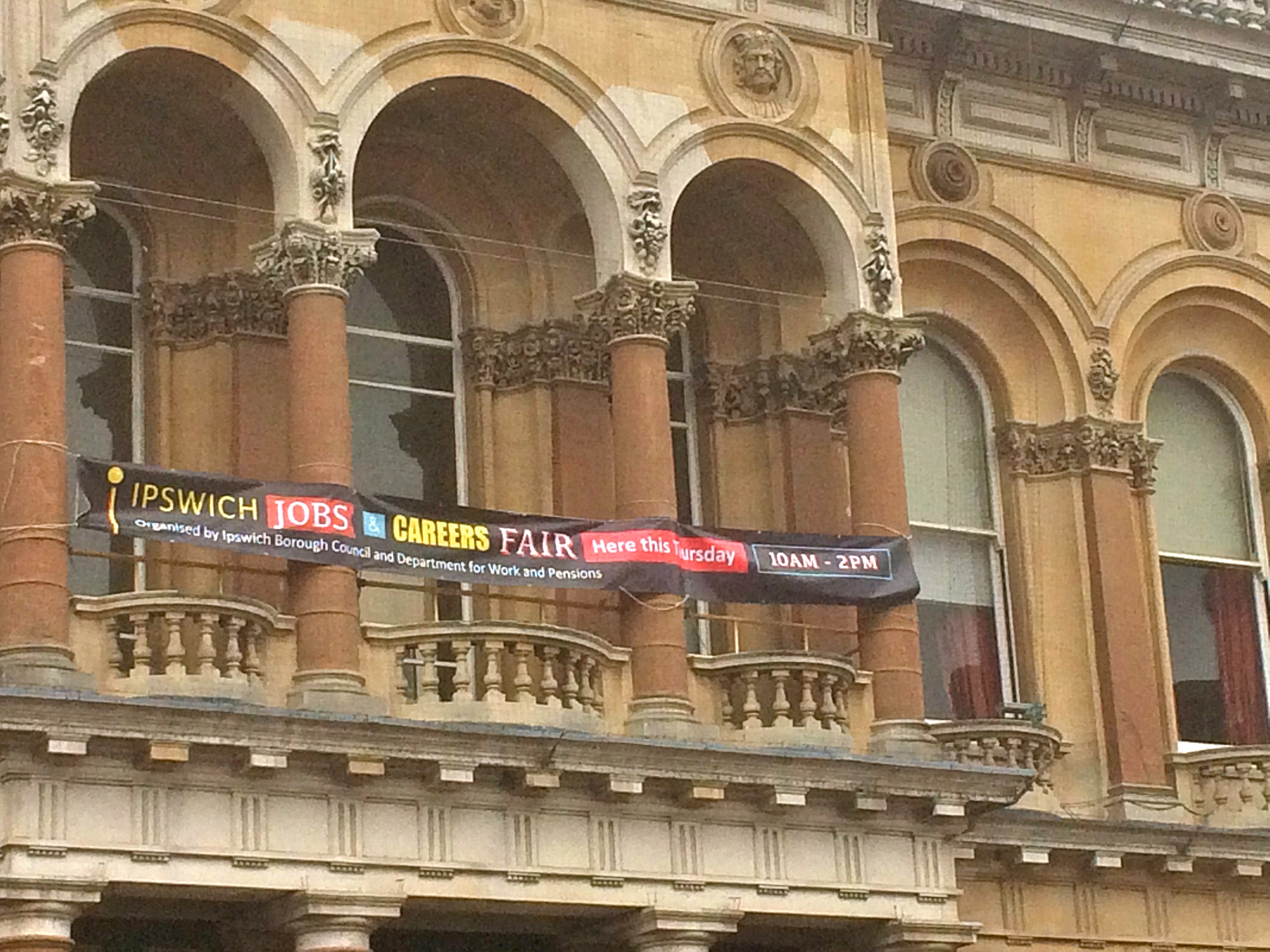
Ipswich Town Hall

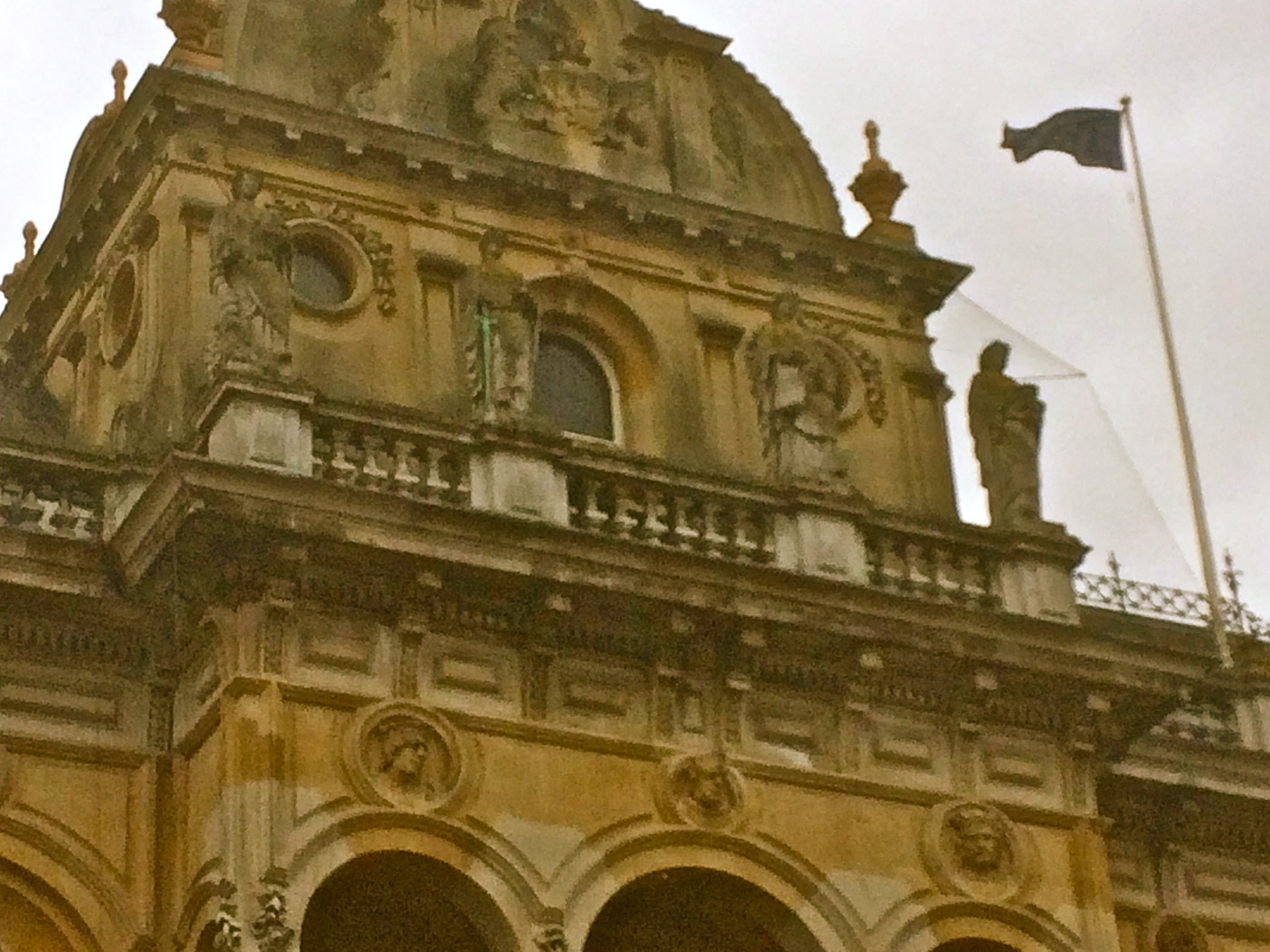
Ipswich Town Hall

== Shops and commercial buildings ==
=== Boston ===
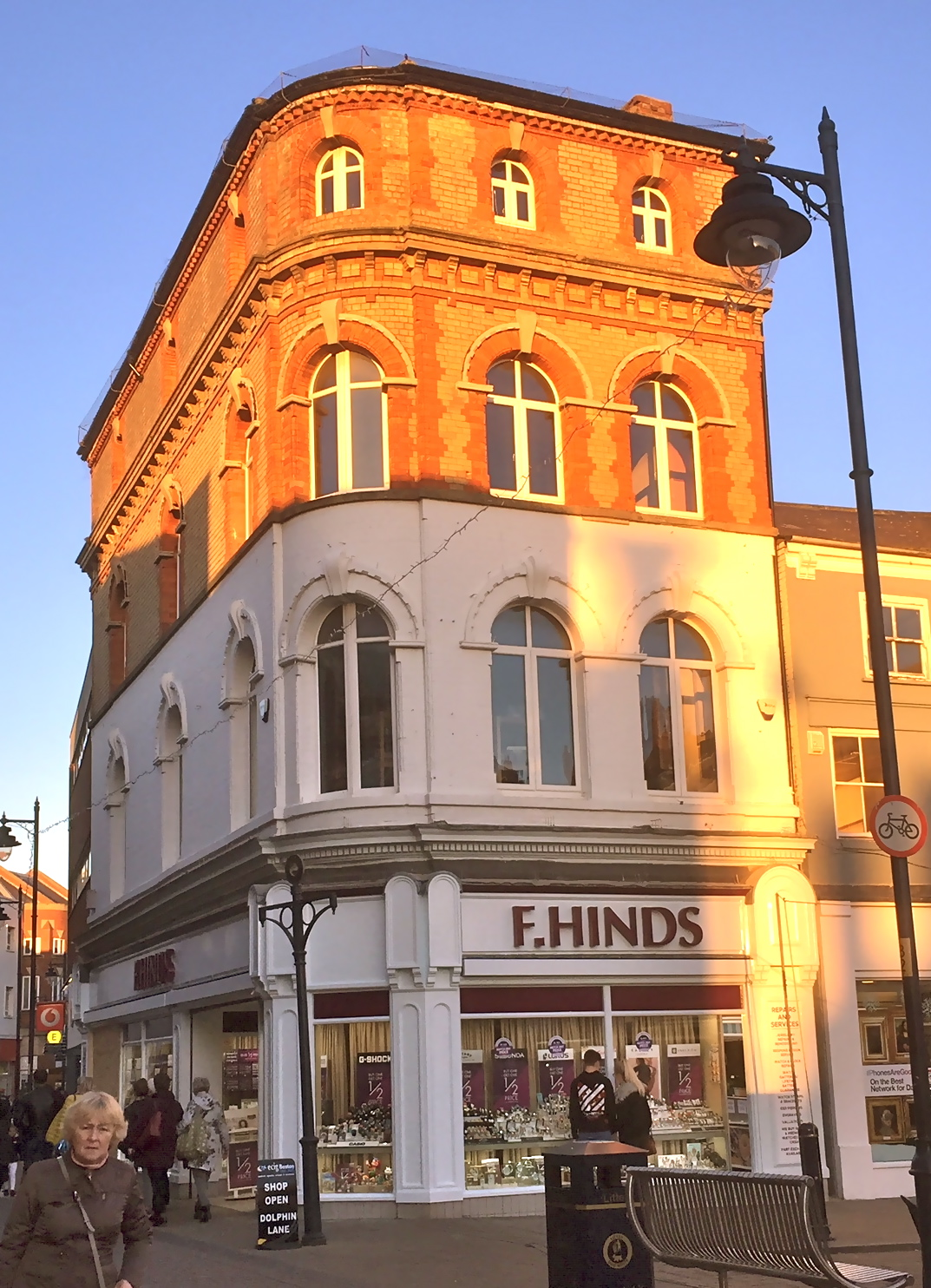
No 1, Market Place, Boston, 1861

- No1 Market Place, Boston, Lincolnshire. (1861) Four-storey shop with arched windows. Contrasting red and yellowish brickwork. Designed by Bellamy for J Morton printers in 1861.

=== Caistor ===
- 2 The Market Place, Caistor (1849). Shop rebuilt for Mr Robinson, Grocer and Draper. The premises are currently being renovated by the Caistor & District Community Trust.

=== Horncastle ===
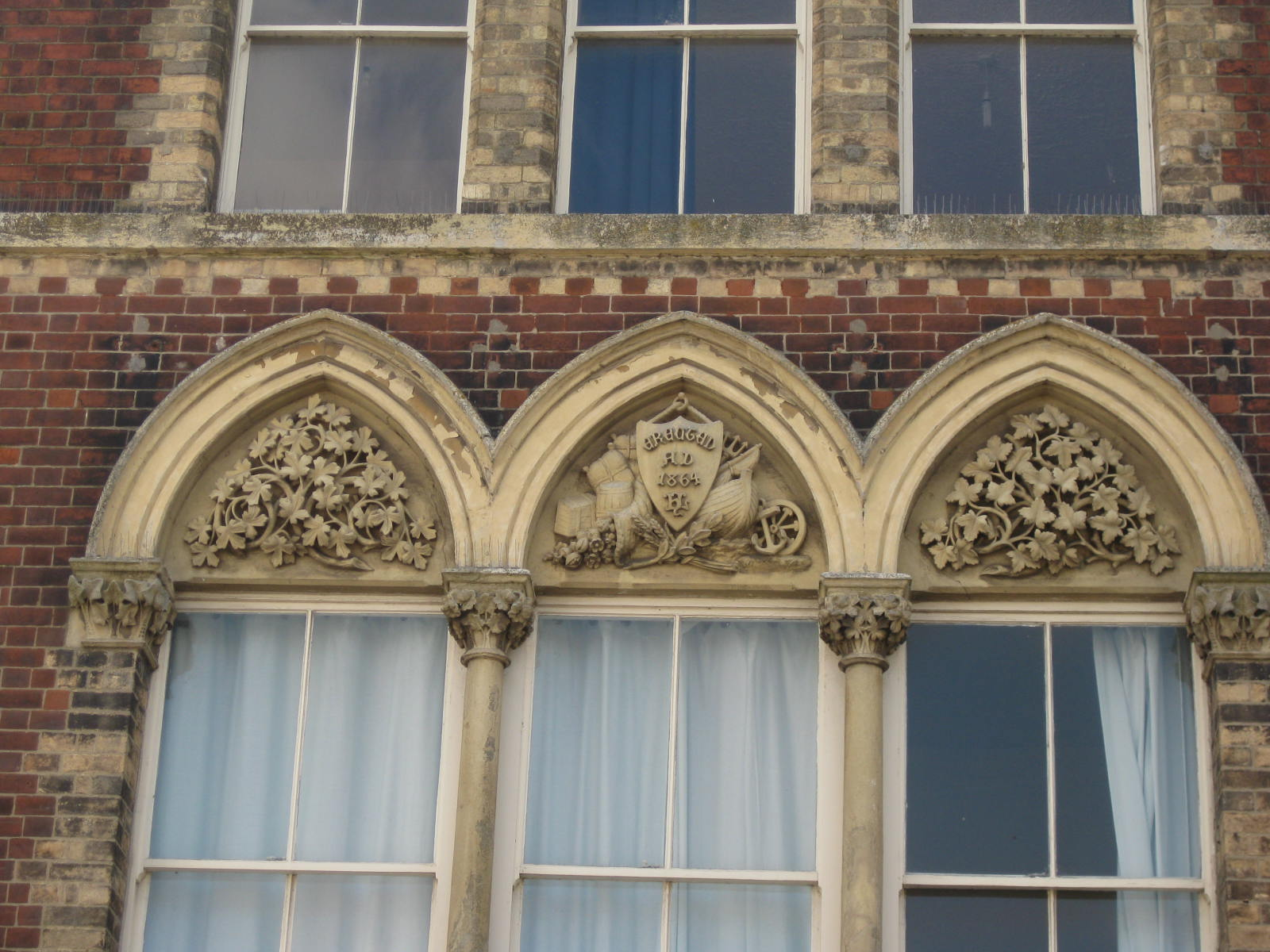
No 5 Bridge Street, Horncastle, Lincolnshire 1864. Terracotta foliage decoration in tympana above window.

- No. 5 Bridge Street, Horncastle. Shop and Warehouse for Henry Lunn, Grocer. 1864.
- Navigation Warehouse, Bridge Street, Horncastle (1865) Wool warehouse for the Horncastle Navigation.

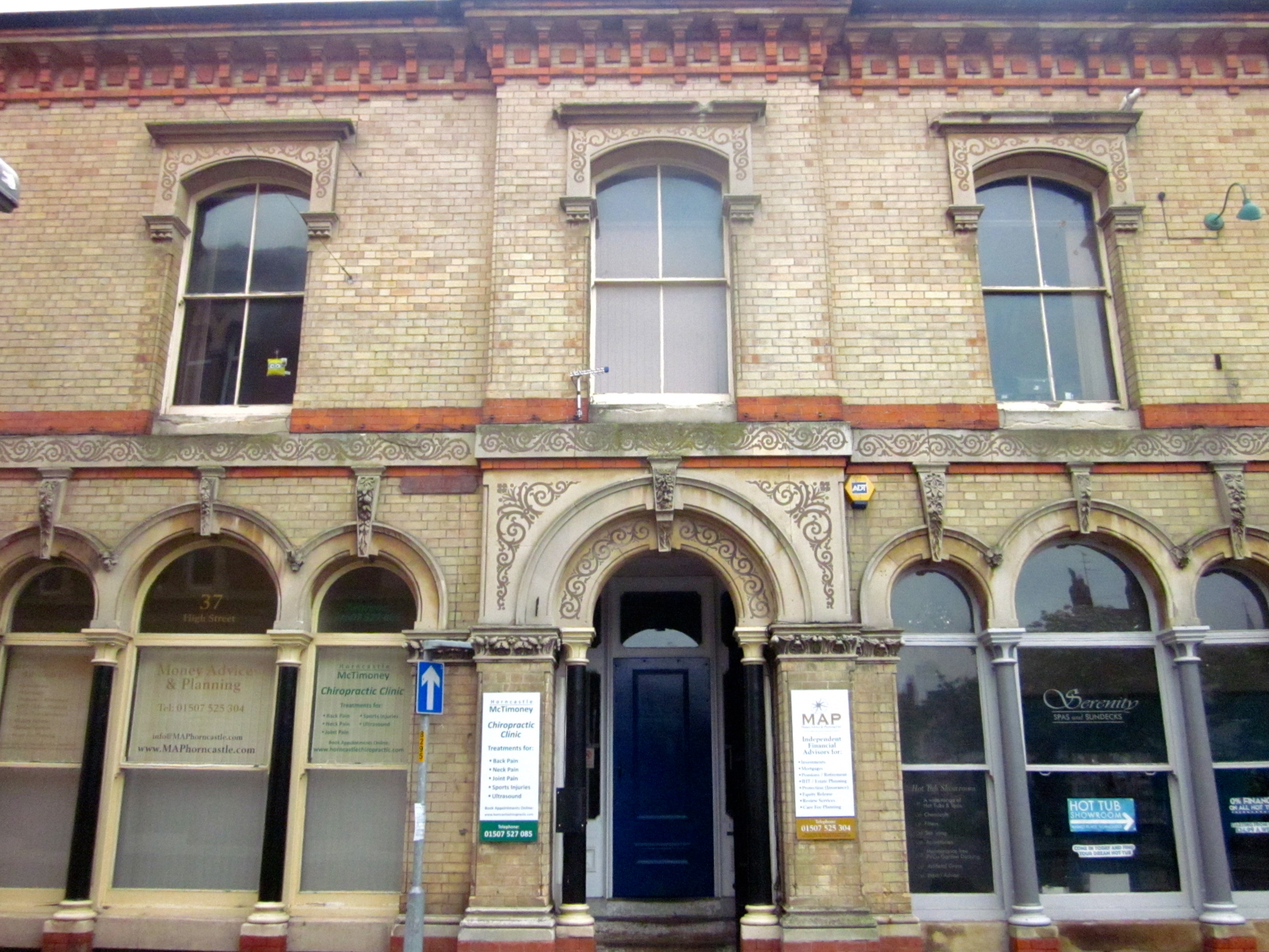
Punch House, Market Place, Horncastle 1868

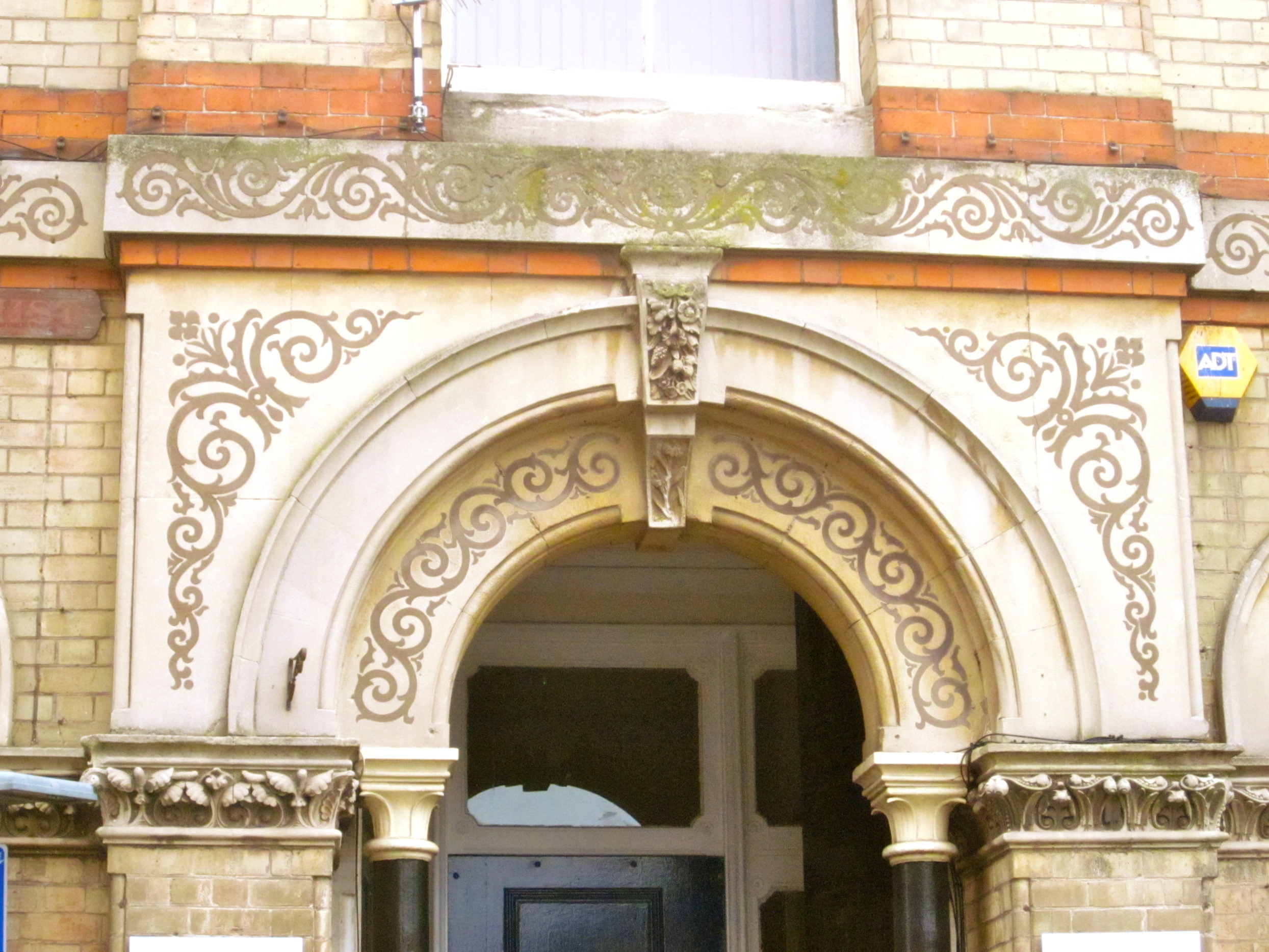
Punch House, Market Place, Horncastle

- The Punch House, 17 High Street (Market Place), Horncastle. (1868). A remarkable curved building which Pevsner describes as "quasi-Italian Gothic". It was built on the site of the Old Vicarage as "shops and dwellings". It was later a public house. It makes extensive use of artificial stone, probably made by Fambrini & Daniels of Lincoln. which is inlaid with reddish scrollwork. It is Grade II listed. It is built using yellow gault or stock bricks. Two storeys with continuous curved front from west running round to south. eight bay front with red brick ashlar dressed plinth, ornate first floor band with red brick and ashlar, the latter with continuous inlaid foliate scrolls. North east corner curved with central doorway with flanking ashlar columns with foliate capitals, semi-circular head, plain fanlight and moulded ashlar head with hood mould, label stops and ornate raised keystone and double panelled doors.

=== Hull ===
- No.39 Market Place Hull (1860). Messrs Jennibon & Sons drapers shop was re-built to designs by Bellamy and Hardy.

=== Lincoln ===
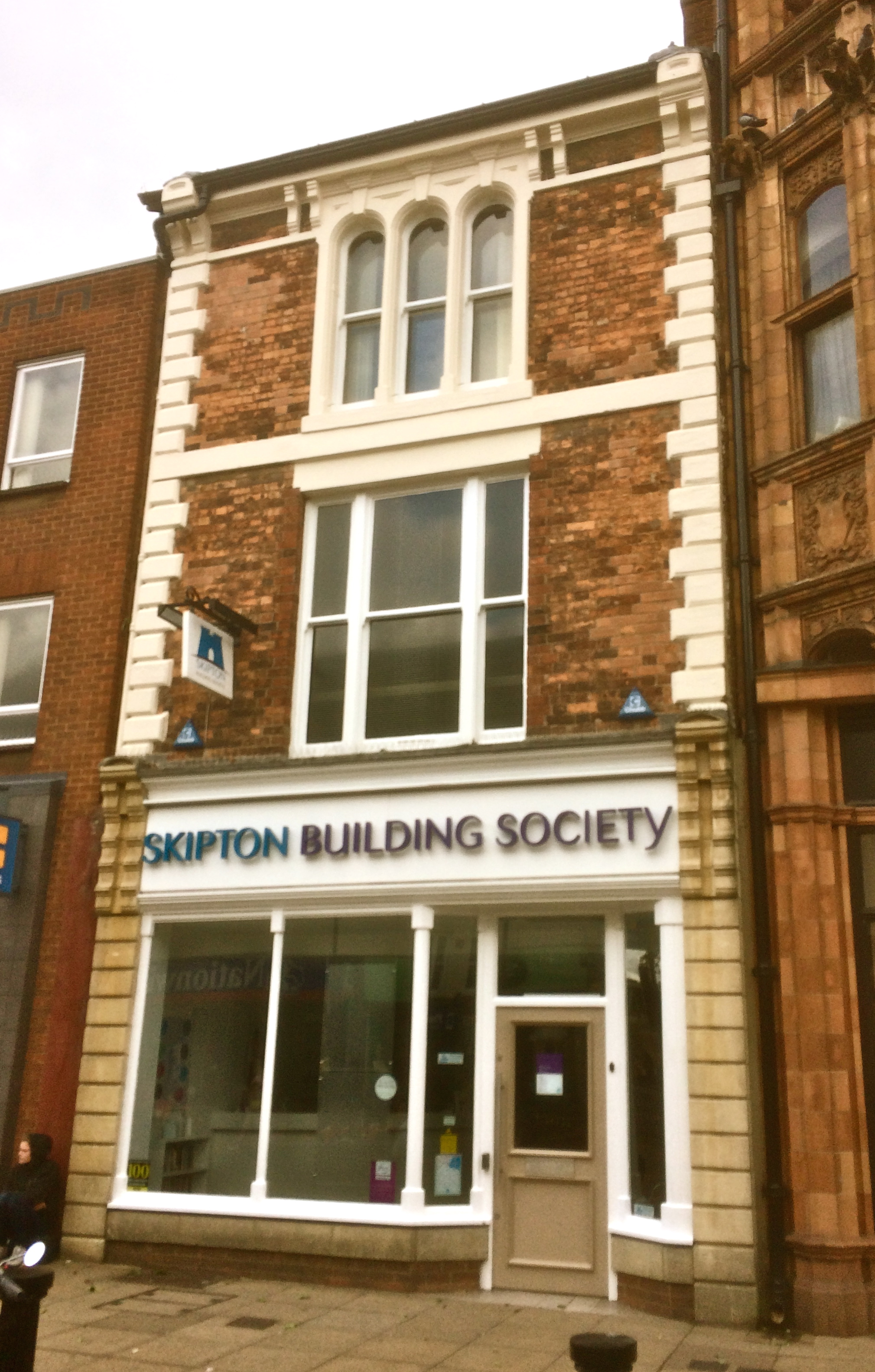
189 High Street Lincoln, frontage 1853

- 189 High Street, Lincoln (1853). Skipton Building Society. The Lincolnshire Chronicle on 8 April 1853 records that "Mr. Wm. Old, hatter, of the Highstreet, in Lincoln, has followed the example of his enterprising fellow-townsmen, in putting a handsome new plate-glass window into his shop. The new front, which presents a very imposing appearance, and is much admired, is from a design of Mr. Pearson Bellamy, architect, and is tastefully executed in its details by the workmen of Mr. C. Ward." Old's shop was at 189 High street and the frontage still survives. Brick, three storeys, stucco rustication and stringband. The two upper storeys each have a central tri-part window. The upper tri-part window is arched in a typical Bellamy style. At street level there is a replacement sectional plate glass window below a cornice with double corbel brackets to the side of the cornice and fascia.
- Coney's. 255 High Street Lincoln (1853). The present shop in Italian Palazzo style was rebuilt on the site of the former Proctor's Court.
- 217-8 High Street. Smith's Grocers. Two bay, three storeys. Italian Palazzo style. Decorative stucco rustication. Converted into the Regal Cinema in 1915. Demolished, becoming a Littlewood's store and now Primark.
- Guildhall Street Lincoln. In April 1860 Bellamy and Hardy advertised for "PERSONS willing TENDER for Works required to be done in the ERECTION and COMPLETION of additional WAREHOUSE, CELLARS, and SAMPLE-ROOM to Premises belonging to Mr. Robert Dawber, merchant to the above street,". This probable refers to the Cheltenham Arms, 14/15 Guildhall Street, (now the William Foster), although Dawbers also had offices on the opposite side of the street. Dawbers' public house were sold to Mowbray & Sons in 1905 and the Cheltenham Arms was re-fashioned by Mortimer & Son in 1907
- 30 Sincil Street, Lincoln (1870). The Willow Pattern Public House. Prominent Oriel window.
- 168 High Street, Lincoln (1870) Shop, Dwelling and photographic workshops. Built for Robert Slingsby, an early photographer, specialised in carte-de-visite portrait photography. The business passed to Harrison in 1896, who continued in these premises until 1959.

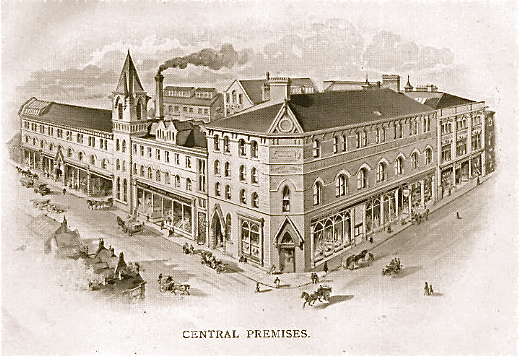
Lincoln Co-operative Society, Silver Street 1872 and later

- Lincoln Co-operative Central Building, Silver Street, Lincoln. Built on the site of Palfrey House which was purchased from a Mr Brogden in 1872. Part of the site was sold for Palfrey's Chambers and Akrill's Printing Works. The Building was extended to the south on Free School Lane in 1884. This building was demolished between 1961 and 1963, but the 1884 extension survives.
- Bank Street. Offices of William Cooling, solicitor (1872) Adjacent to St Swithin's Churchyard.
- 30a and 31 Sincil Street, Lincoln. (1875) Was Cockerill's China Warehouse. Now My Gym and Seasalt. Originally five houses with three on front and two behind in Smith’s Court, built after 1824. Owned by Thomas Cockerill before 1857 and rebuilt by Bellamy and Hardy for Thomas Cockerill in 1875 (LCPF 679 Oct 1875))
- 294 High Street, Lincoln (1877). On corner with Silver Street. Extension of shop belonging to J.R.Battle. Corner of High Street with Silver Street. Demolished June 1970.
- 1–5 St Mary's Street, Lincoln. 1883 Row of shops opposite St Mary Le Wigford. These were originally a row of five houses which Bellamy had designed in 1847. These were reduced in size and converted into shops and in 1897 these premises had been acquired by Thomas Foster, a draper at 326 High Street and he employed William Watkins to design an extension to his shop to the east and create a series of "showrooms" display bow windows at first floor level. Later split back into single shops.
- 14 Bailgate, Lincoln (1884). In 1884 Bellamy and Hardy advertised for tenders for the erection of a warehouse and out-buildings for Robert Seely, grocer, Bailgate. Lincoln. The upper surviving part of the facade of the shop is also typical of Pearson Bellamy's work.

=== Louth ===
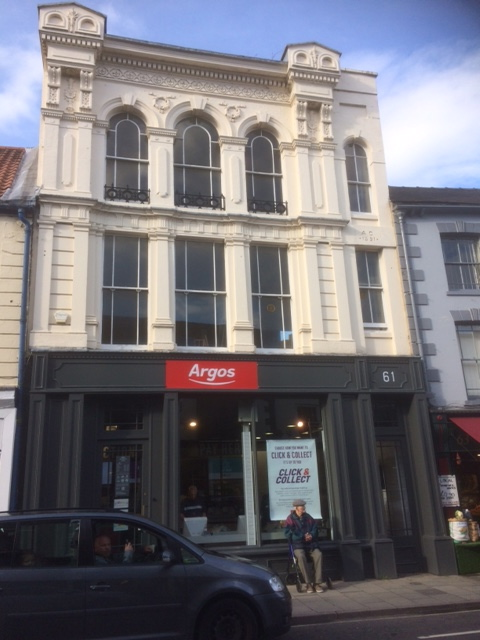
61 Eastgate Louth

- 59 and 61 Eastgate, Louth, Lincolnshire. In December 1858 the Stamford Mercury reports "A noble Improvement has been effected in Eastgate by the erection by Mr. Swaby of two elegant shops, one of them occupied by him and the other by Mr. Rd. Snowden, and designed by and built under the direction of Messrs. Bellamy and Hardy, architects, of Lincoln and Louth, to whose talent and correct architectural taste the Midland counties, some of the Yorkshire towns, and this town in particular, are indebted for so many fine buildings, noble specimens of architecture." These two buildings appear to be 59 and 61 (Argos), the latter being in typical Pearson Bellamy's Venetian style. Pevsner remarks: No 61 of 1851 stands above the rest, Italianate, with an extravagant display of stucco decoration. The construction date of 61 Eastgate is confirmed by an advertisement in the Stamford Mercury in January 1851 for a tender for work on the premises 'lately in the occupation of Mr. Batterham, draper, such Additions, Alterations, and Repairs to the House, together with New Shop Front, and Plate-glass Windows'. William Brown described it as a "lofty and capacious building 40 feet high, costing several thousand pounds". It then became Anselm Odling's drapery depot.

=== Market Rasen ===
- King Street Market Rasen. Pearson Bellamy advertised for tenders for a new shop front and alterations for Mr Makin's Shop in February 1859.

=== Industrial buildings ===
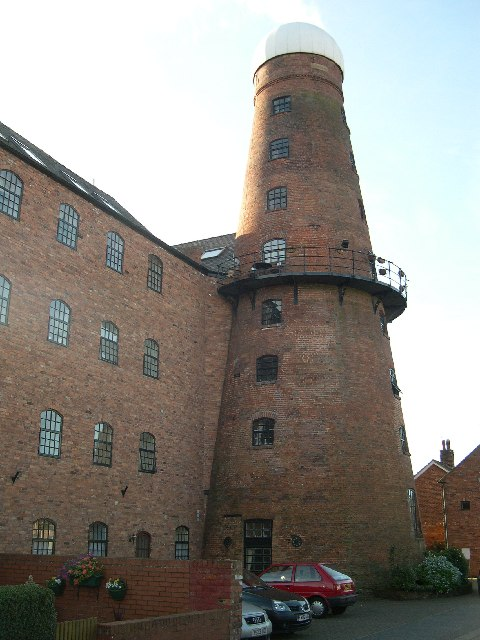
Lincoln, Le Tall's Mill

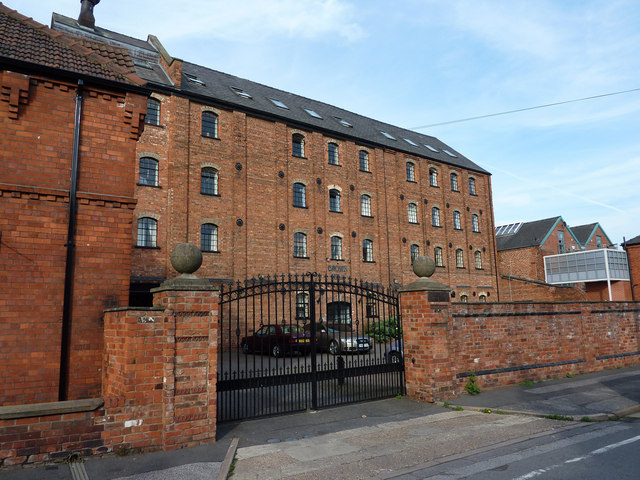
Le Tall's Mill or Crown Mill, Lincoln 1847

- Le Tall's or Crown Mill, Princess Street, Lincoln. (1847). Grade II listed. Designed by Pearson Bellamy for the Lincoln Flour Society. The Flour Society advertised for "CONTRACTORS and BUILDERS. PARTIES desirous of Contracting for the several Works required in the ERECTION of a STEAM FLOUR MILL, may view the Drawings and Specifications the Committee-room, Mrs. Hewick's, Roebuck, High-street; and further particulars may be had at the Office of the Architect, Mr. Pearson Bellamy, 11, Broadgate." It would appear that the windmill and the main block of steam mill were constructed at the same time. Details were also given for the specifications of the engine and milling requirements: "Also to Engineers and Millwrights. Wanted for the above Society, Two High-pressure Engines and Boiler, with Cylinders 13 inches diameter, with 5 pairs of Stones (4 pairs of French and one pair grey), 4ft 6ins diameter, with Counter Gear, Patent Dressing Machine, Elevators, &c complete, and set to work. Size of Engine-house, 23ft long, 9ft wide. 10ft 6in. high from the floor to the underside of the beam.—Size of Boiler-house, 23ft. long, wide, 10ft 6in. high."

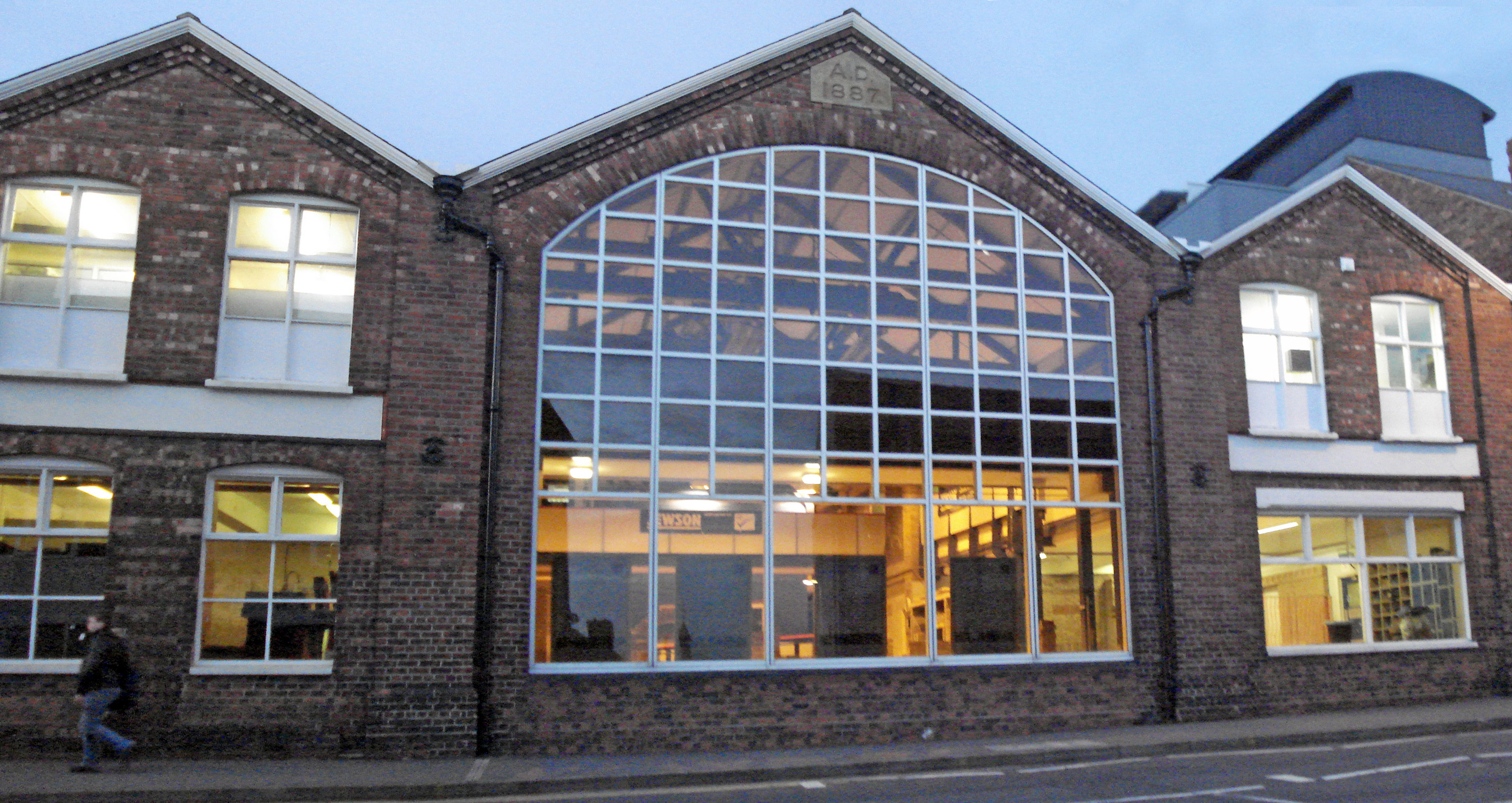
Temple Buildings, 10 Monks Road 1887

- Horncastle Navigation Company (1864). Warehouses to be erected at the wharf of the Navigation Company at Horncastle.
- Various buildings for Lincoln Gas Company in Carholme Road, including a gas purifying house in 1883
- New Gasworks for the Lincoln Gas Company, Bracebridge (1875). The principal contractors included Samuel Sherwin of Boston who built the gas holder tanks, processing tanks and retort house.
- Warehouse for Duckering's Engineering (1874) 53 Waterside/Rosemary Lane.
- Warehouse for Rainforth and Sons, engineers, Temple Buildings, 10 Monks Road 1887. The building still stands and is now part of Lincoln College,

=== Houses by Bellamy and Hardy ===
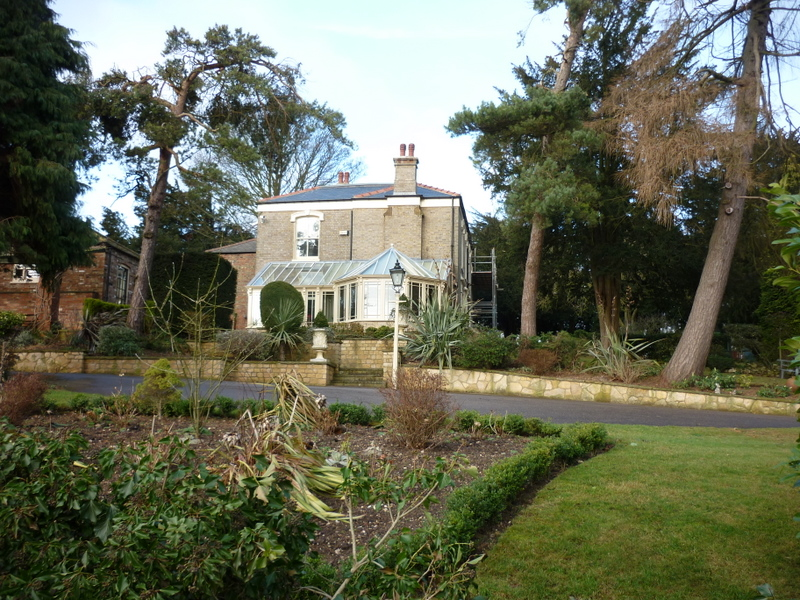
The Old Rectory near Hawerby Hall ?1847

- The Old Rectory, Hawerby cum Beesby, ?1847. N.N.W of Louth. Appears to have been built for the Rev Fitzgerald Wintour.

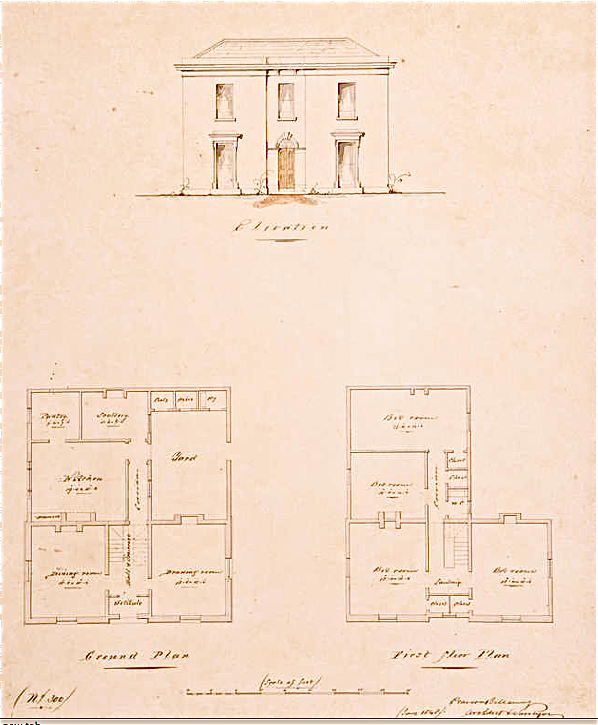
Gentleman's Residence Canwick

- Gentleman's Residence in Canwick Lincoln for "Foster Esq". Architect's drawing by Pearson Bellamy. A design for a house with four bedrooms for the miller and engineer William Foster who founded William Foster & Co. c. 1850. This house was presumably built, as William Foster is recorded as living in Canwick in 1856

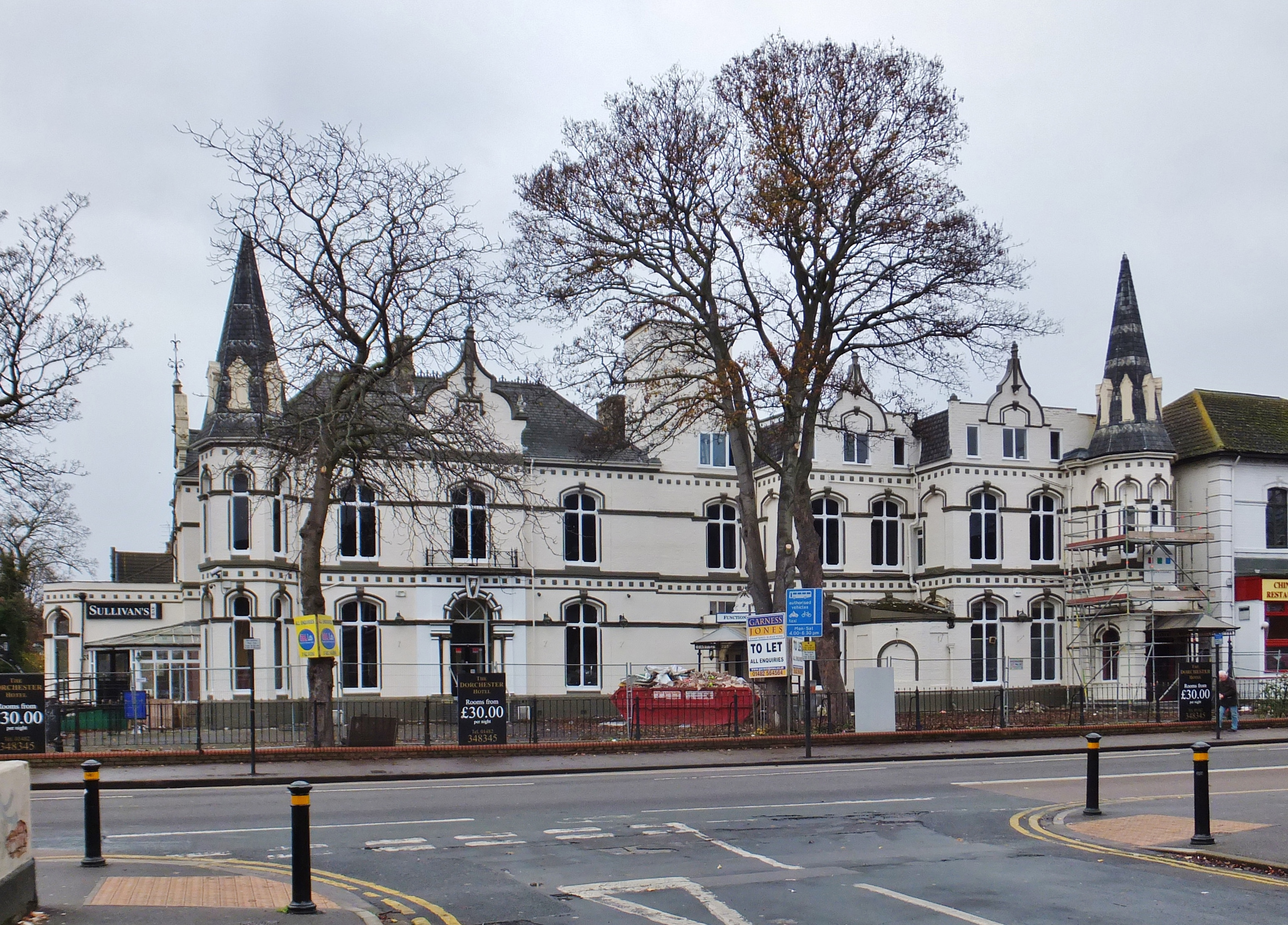
Dorchester Hotel, Beverley Road, Hull, 1861–1862

- Dorchester Hotel, Beverley Road, Hull. Nos. 273 to 277 Beverley Road originally comprised three houses known as Dorchester House, Tamworth Lodge and Stanley House, built 1861–1862 by Bellamy and Hardy for John Bryson, ship owner and timber merchant. Now painted brick with stone dressings; a shaped gables and corner turrets topped by slate-covered spires. In 1937, Stanley House was converted into a guest house and, by 1958, all three houses had become The Dorchester Hotel.
- Highfield House, Summerhill, Gainsborough. (1863). Built for Mr Burton by Mr Jabez Taylor at the tendered cost of £2873 to the designs of Bellamy and Hardy. Frank Merewether Burton FGS was still living in the house in 1896.
- In February 1856 Pearson Bellamy advertised tor tenders for building a house in Horncastle. This is very probably Maypole House in West Street, Horncastle.
- Burton Rectory, Lincoln. Designed Stable block for Rectory 1867.
- Boothby Hall, Far End, Boothby Graffoe.1867. A dinner was held at the Reindeer Inn, Navenby to celebrate the completion of the building for C. E. Marfleet, which at that time was known as Boothby House. "Fifty-four sat down to the repast, after which the usual patriotic toasts were drunk with all honours. These were followed by the healths of Mr. Marfleet, Messrs Bellamy and Hardy, the architects, and Mr. Huddleston, the builder. The supper was of a substantial character, and a very pleasant evening was spent." The Hall is described in J. G . Ruddock's "Boothby Graffoe and Somerton Castle" (1980). Parts of the building, which had become derelict during the Second World War, were demolished in 1951/2.The Dining and Drawing rooms were retained as the core of a smaller house.
- North Sandsfield House, Morton Road, Gainsborough (now part of Queen Elizabeth's High School). Built for £2815 for the Sandars family of Gainsborough brewers, who moved to Gate Burton Hall in 1907. Yellow brick Victorian villa house with ashlar dressings.

Houses in Louth. Pearson Bellamy designed many houses in Louth, particularly near Linden Walk, Newmarket and Lee Street. An example of a larger villa house is Elmhurst on Crowtree Lane. Houses in Leighton Buzzard In October 1861 Pearson Bellamy advertised for tenders for building three villas in Hockliffe Road, Leighton Buzzard. These houses appear to be nos. 50, 52 and 57 Hockliffe Road.

=== Housing developments in Lincoln ===
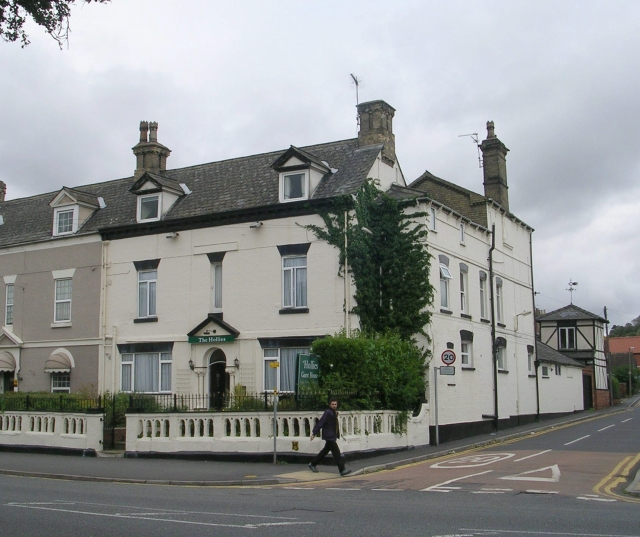
The Hollies Guest House – Carholme Road, Lincoln

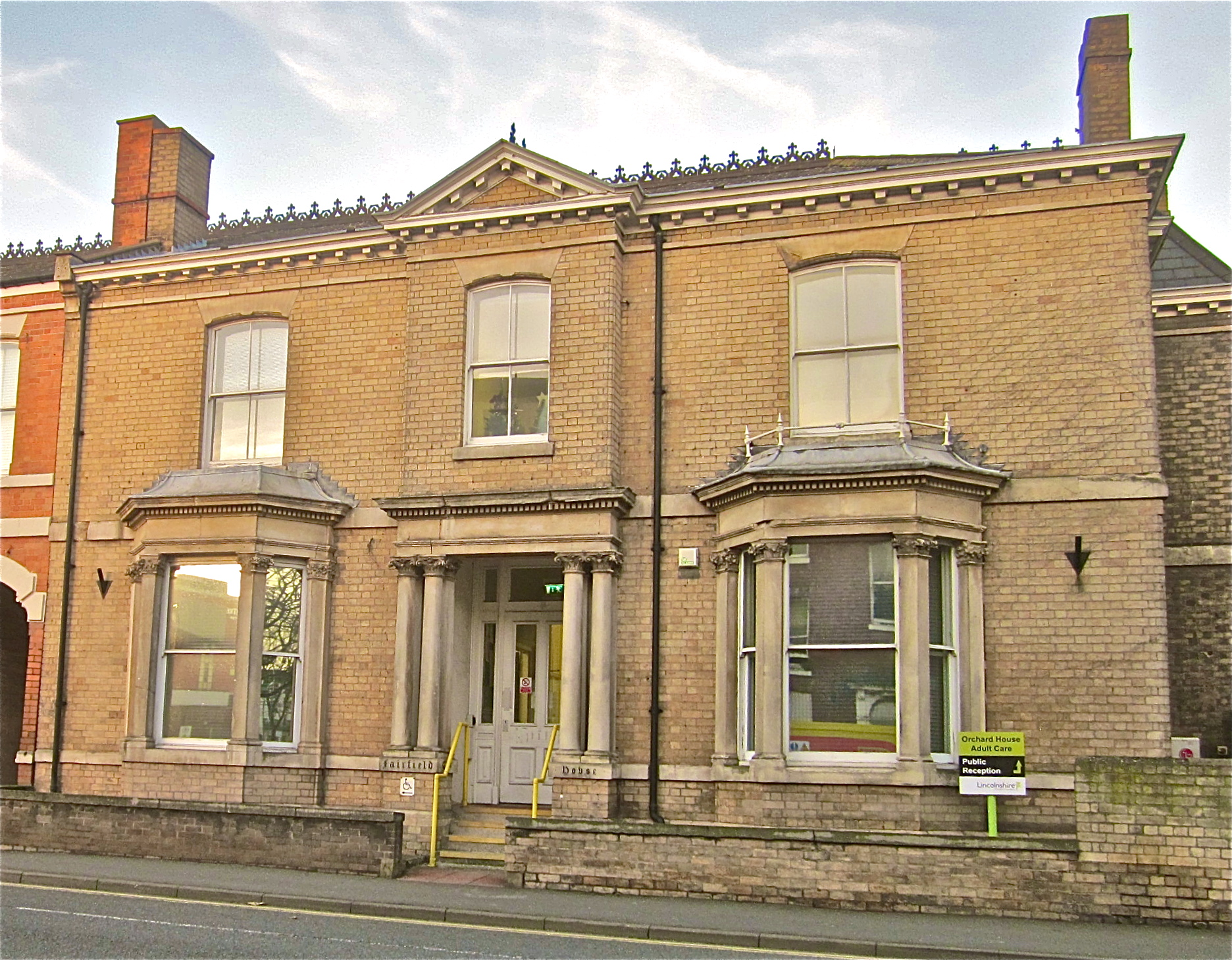
Fairfield House Newland Lincoln

Bellamy and Hardy were very involved in the suburban development on the edge of the historic core of Lincoln which took place in the second half of the 19th. century. This is included the designing of villa residences for Lincoln's prospering middle classes. The main areas that were developed by Bellamy and Hardy were in Newland, Newland Street West, Orchard Street and lower part of Yarborourgh Road on the western side of Lincoln; houses in Sewell Road and Lindum Terrace in the north-east and St Catherine's and South Park on the southern side.

- Hollies Guest House 65 Carholme Road, Lincolnand adjacent terrace of three houses. Built before 1851 and then known as Carholme Terrace. The Hollies was probably occupied from that date by Pearson Bellamy and he was certainly there from 1856. The Hollies is larger than the adjacent houses, which are built in a similar style, and the Hollies is faced in stucco (which may be more recent) while the rest of the terrace is in whitish yellow brick. The Hollies also has an ornamental entrance portico.

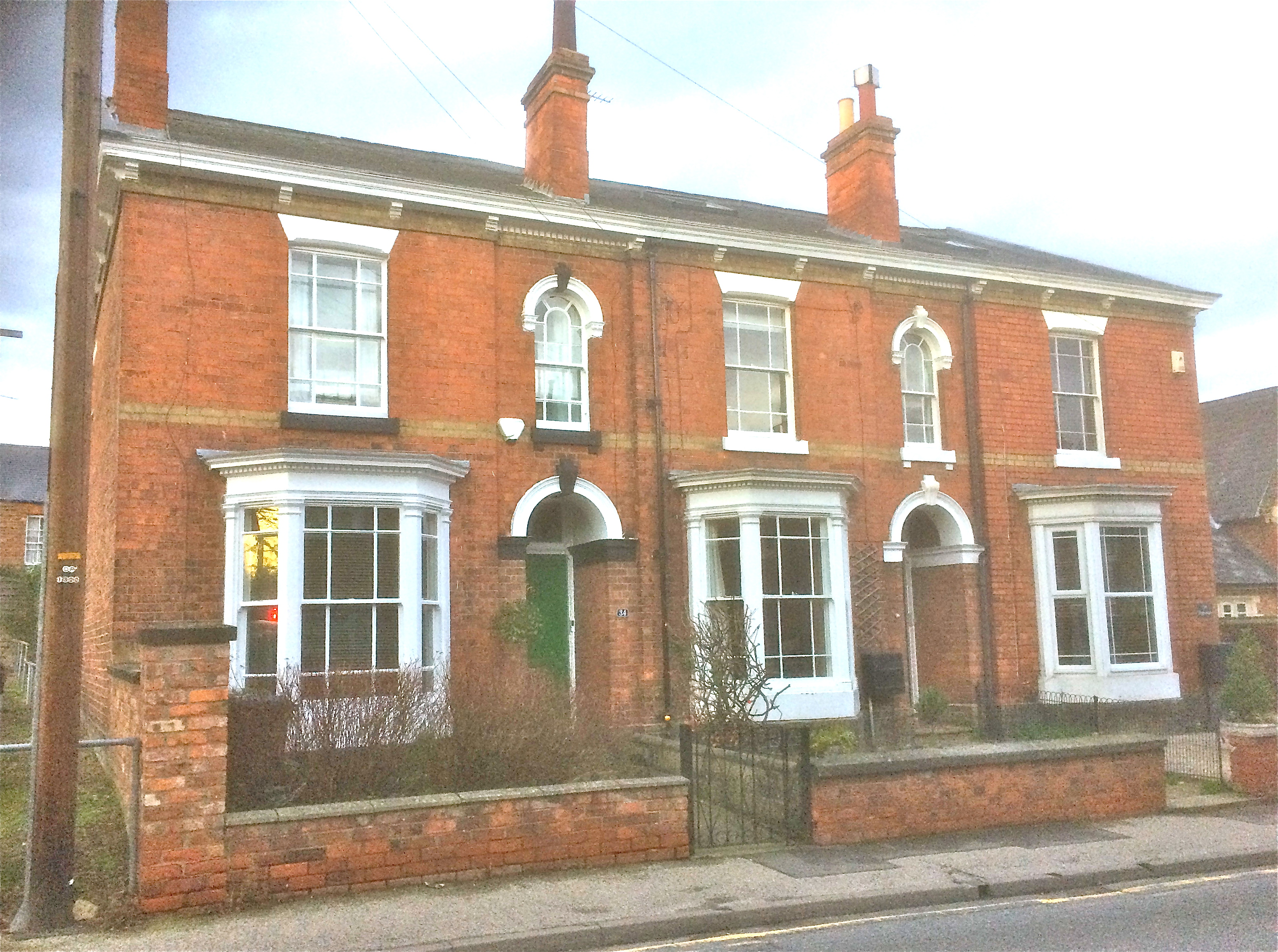
34-38 Greetwellgate, Lincoln, 1870

- 34-38 Greetwellgate, Lincoln. Three houses built for Miss Cookson in 1870.
- 21 St Catherines, Lincoln. 1870. Known as the "Hollies" and built for William Beard, a retired draper and later occupied by Hugh Wyatt who was mayor of Lincoln on four occasions. It later became St Catherine's Guest House and was demolished in 2006. The site is now occupied by a block of flats.

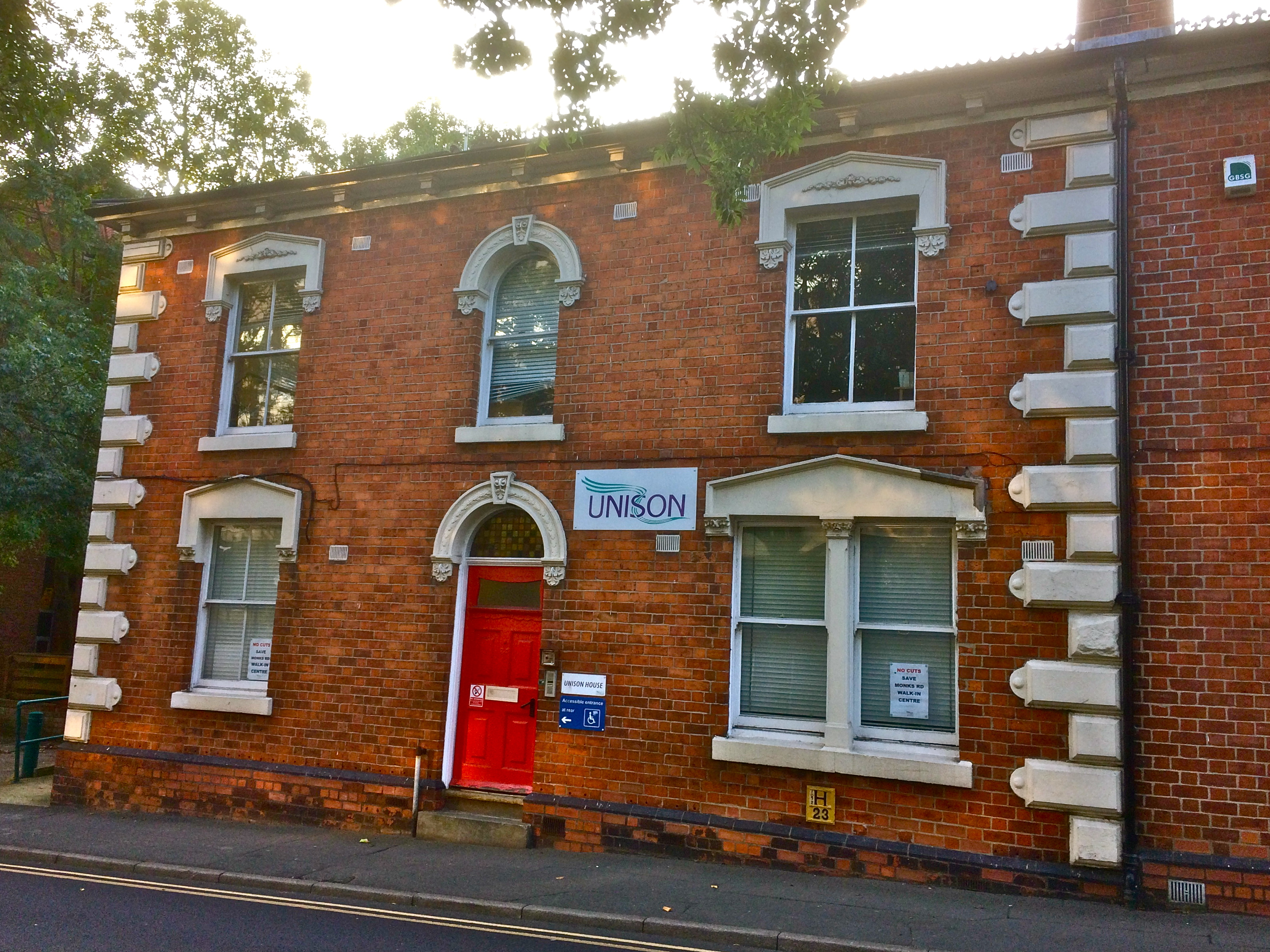
34 Orchard Street, Lincoln

- 34–36 Orchard Street, Lincoln. 1871. Now Unison offices. Prominent strap-work stucco quoins.
- 45–49 Newland, Lincoln.1871. Built for Mr Cooling. No 49 is a yellowish brick faced house on the corner with Orchard Street. Portico. The other two houses are of brick. Extensive use is made of decorative artificial stone columns and capitals, probably manufactured by Fambrini and Daniel of Lincoln.

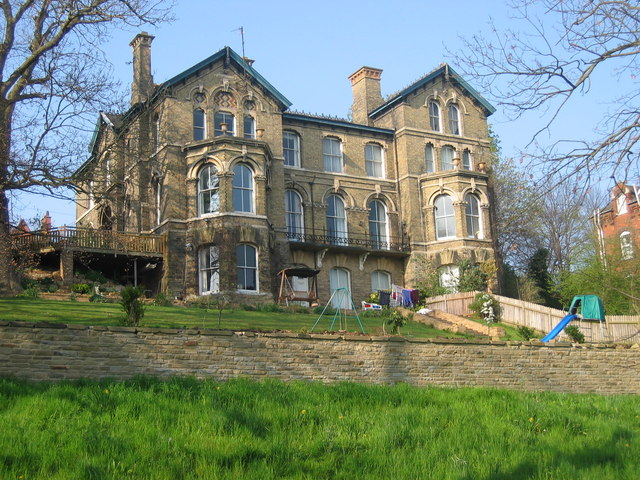
Rear of house on Lindum Terrace, Lincoln

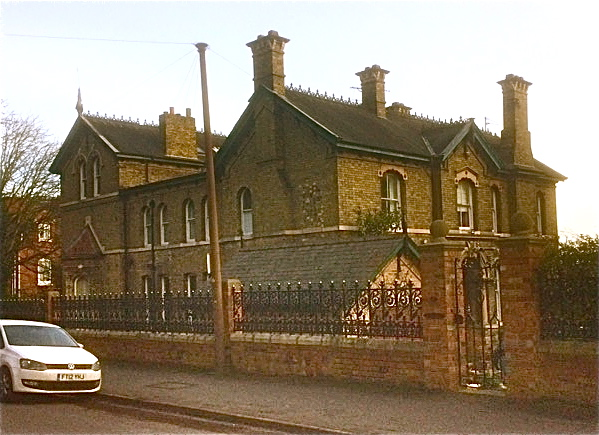
16 Lindum Terrace, Lincoln

- 15–16 Lindum Terrace. Lincoln. 1872. Two grand semi-detached houses designed by Bellamy and Hardy for T.G. Brogden. With 'Polychrome' brickwork above windows. Extensive use of artificial stone. Brogden was a successful Lincoln Newspaper proprietor and printer and also provided financial support to Michael Penistan, Bellamy's brother-in-Law

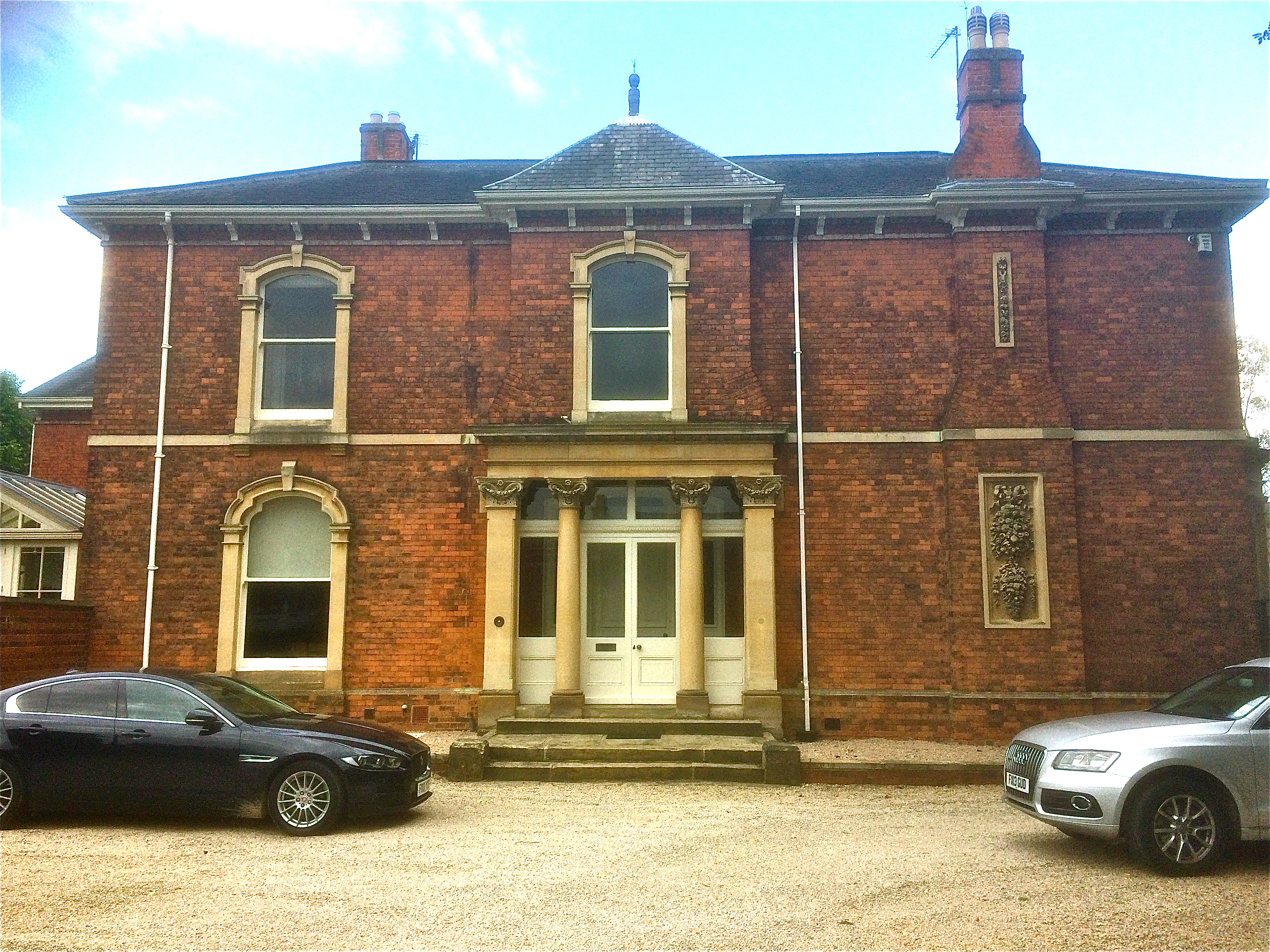
Sewell Road, Lincoln

- Sincil Bank, Lincoln. 9 houses 27-33 Chelmsford Street & 34-38 Sincil Bank (1872). Built by Thomas Lovelee. This terrace of houses are built in limestone.
- 43 St Catherines, Lincoln.1874. Described as a "villa".
- 19-31 St Faith Street.(1875). 7 "Tenement" houses. Built by Thomas Lovelee. The back walls of these houses, facing South Parade are stone with gothic windows. The site was previously part of St Faith's churchyard.
- 1 Sewell Road, (off Greetwell Road) Lincoln. House designed by Pearson Bellamy for J S Battle (Chemist & Druggist) in 1876. Embellished with terracotta plaques (probably by Fambrini and Daniel) on the chimney stack.
- 28 Derby Street & 14-26 Colegrave Street Lincoln. 1870. 8 houses with distinctive polychrome brickwork. These are almost certainly the houses built for W Beard.
- Highfield, Yarborough Road.Lincoln 1884. Detached house built for William Newton, Secretary for Lincoln Brick Company.
- 111–115 Portland Street, St Andrews Villas 10 Houses

==== Housing at South Park, Lincoln ====
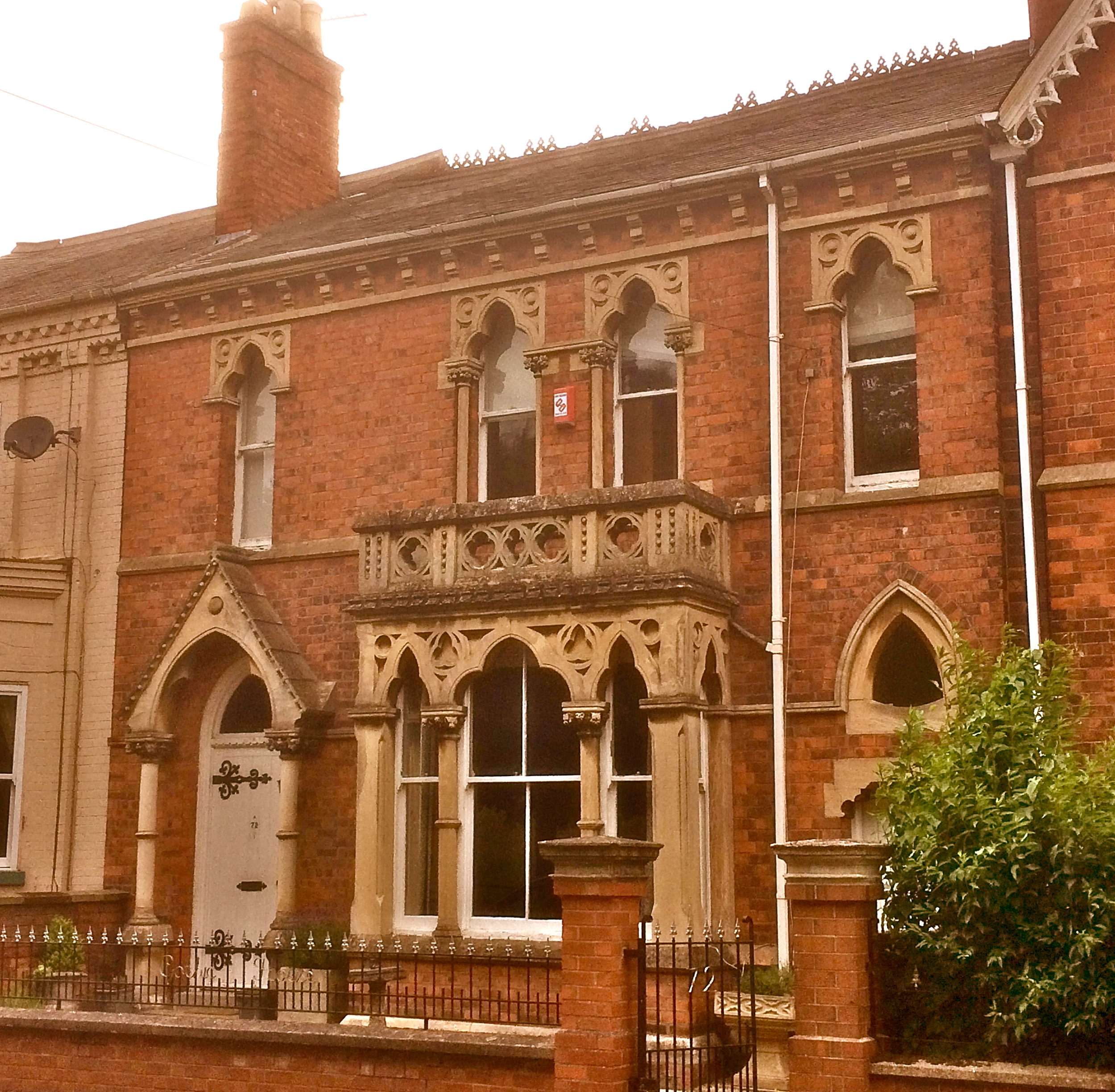
South Park, Lincoln

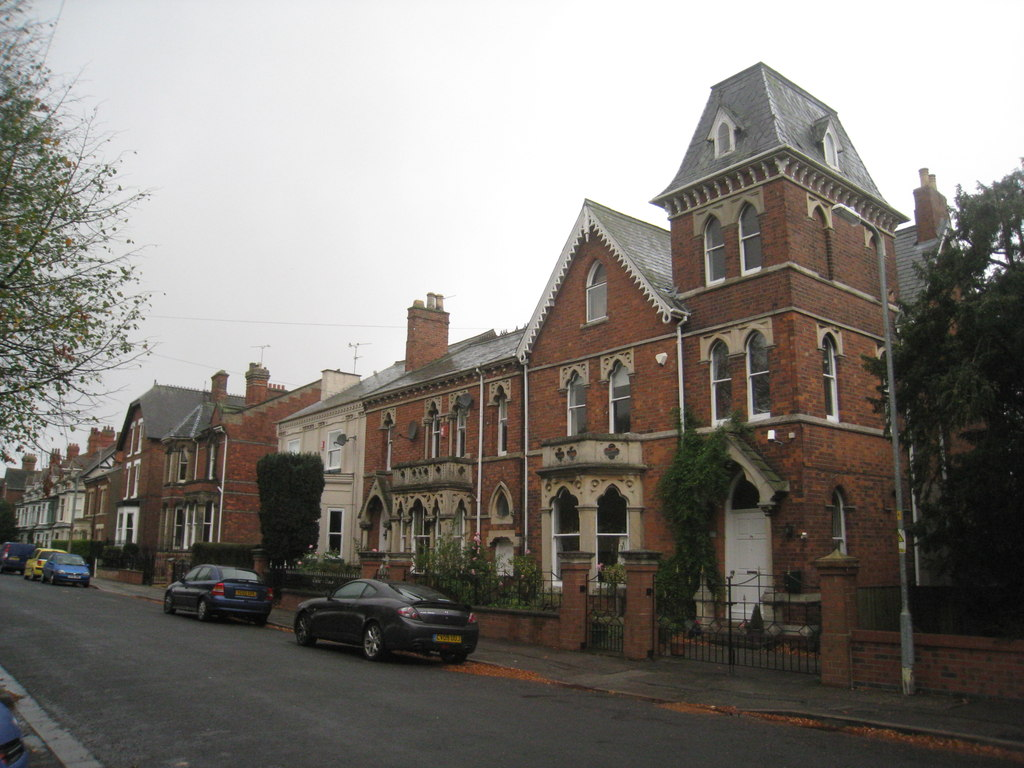
South Park Avenue- buildings by Pearson Bellamy

In the 1870s Bellamy developed a group of houses on South Park facing South Common. These included numbers 58-59, a double villa (Briergate and Clyde Villa) in 1889. Briergate was the home of Bellamy's son-in-law William Rainforth jnr. He also designed impressive villas nos 72 and 73 built in a Venetian Gothic style in 1872.

==== Market Rasen, Lincolnshire ====
6,7 & 8 Kilnwell Road, Market Rasen, Lincolnshire. Three houses, No 8 being a single villa house and No 6-7 being a double villa house appear to be the houses, referred to in the Stamford Mercury, as being rebuilt in 1852.

=== Housing in Grimsby ===
It is likely that Pearson Bellamy designed a considerable number of houses in Grimsby in the period 1855-75, but at the moment, while many houses have the stylistic characteristics of Bellamy’s work, confirmation from documentary sources is not forthcoming. The Lincolnshire Chronicle does refer to three houses in Lower Burgess Street being built to Bellamy’s designs, but these appear to have been demolished. Possible buildings cluster round Bargate, Abbey Road, Augusta Street, Dudley Street Welholme road and Welholme Avenue. Many of these houses have Venetian windows and arched windows, of a design often used by Bellamy. In Abbey Road "The Hawthorns " and "St Leonard’s House" (nos. 103 & 105) have black bricks sandwiched between yellow brick stringing and roof cresting, which is typical of Bellamy's designs. The adjacent terrace, known as Clarence Terrace (65-95 Abbey Road ) and nicknamed the spectacles houses might be attributed to Bellamy. These are two storey, red brick, with blue slate roofs with iron cresting, cornice gutters with modillions. The western terrace has bands of fishscale decoration to the roof slates. Pairs of houses have a double porch supported by round columns with floriated capitals, and bay window on the ground floor with and arched sash windows above. The roofs have a row of distinctive oculus dormer windows, which are borrowed from mid-19th century French Beaux-Arts architecture.

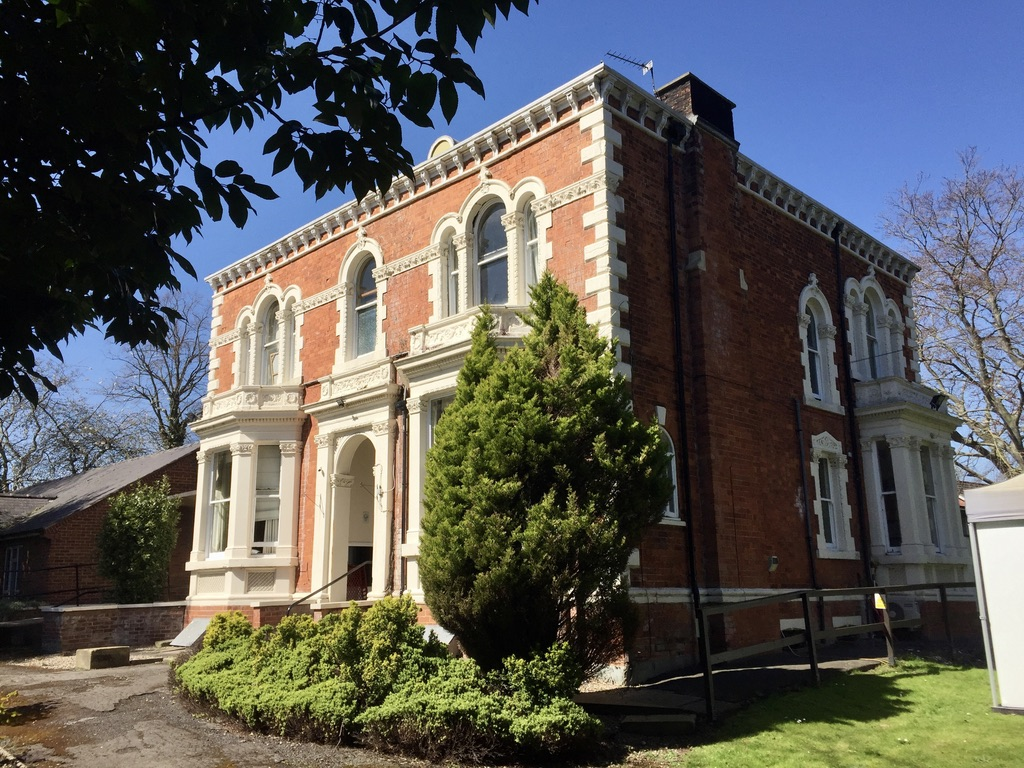
3 Welholme Road, Grimsby

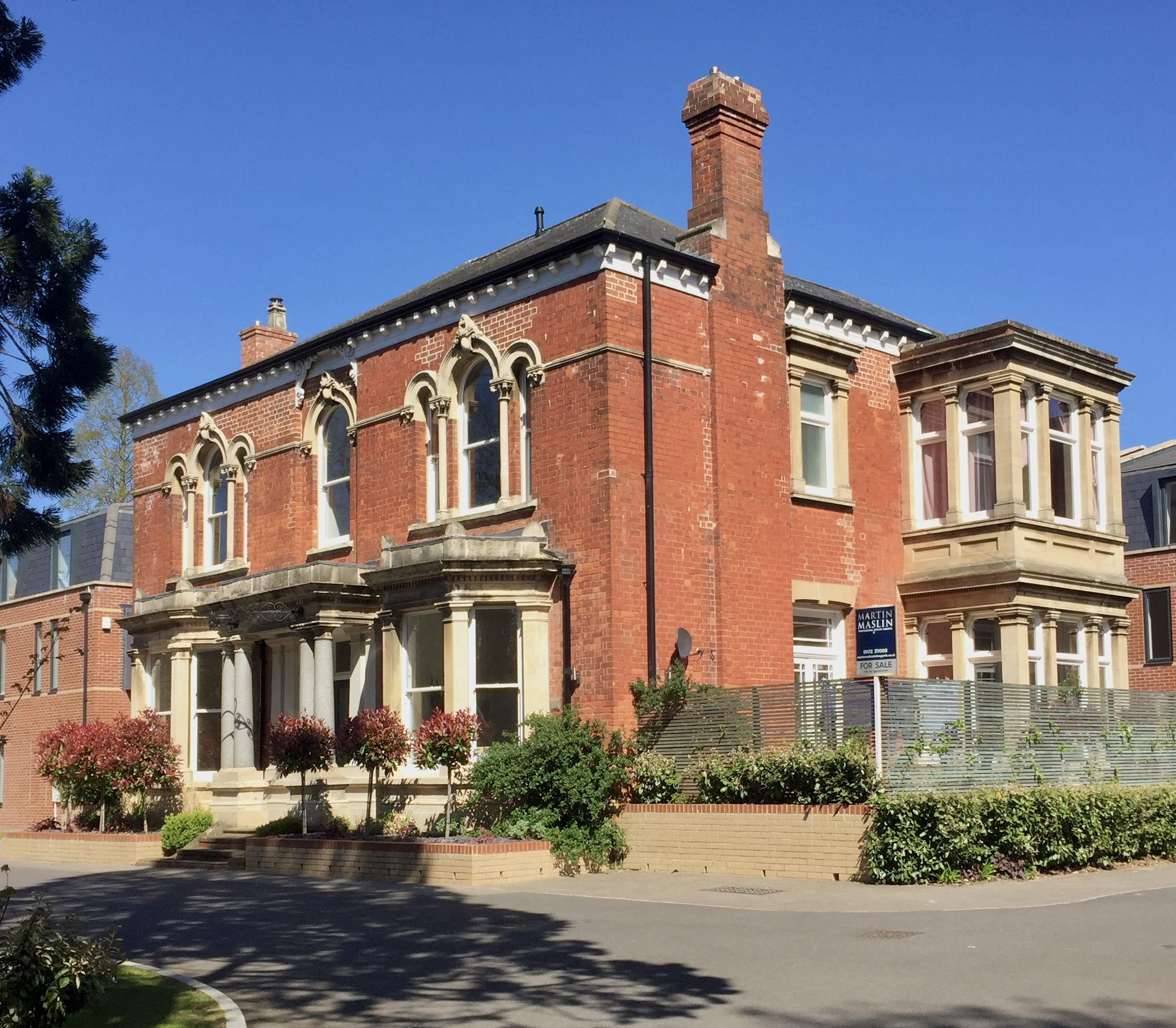
Claremont House, Grimsby

On Bargate The Wheatsheaf ( No 47), formerly Bank House, has a frontage facing Welholme Road, with an extended side elevation along Bargate and it has three Venetian style windows of a design used by Bellamy. Adjacent to the Wheatsheaf on Welholme Road is the former Lancaster House (now Welholme Road Care Centre), an impressive house, again with typical Venetian Windows. This has an oculus dormer window, similar to those on Clarence Terrace on Abbey Road. A similar house in a with Venetian windows is Claremont House in Welholme Avenue close to Abbey Road.

=== Houses by Bellamy and Hardy ===
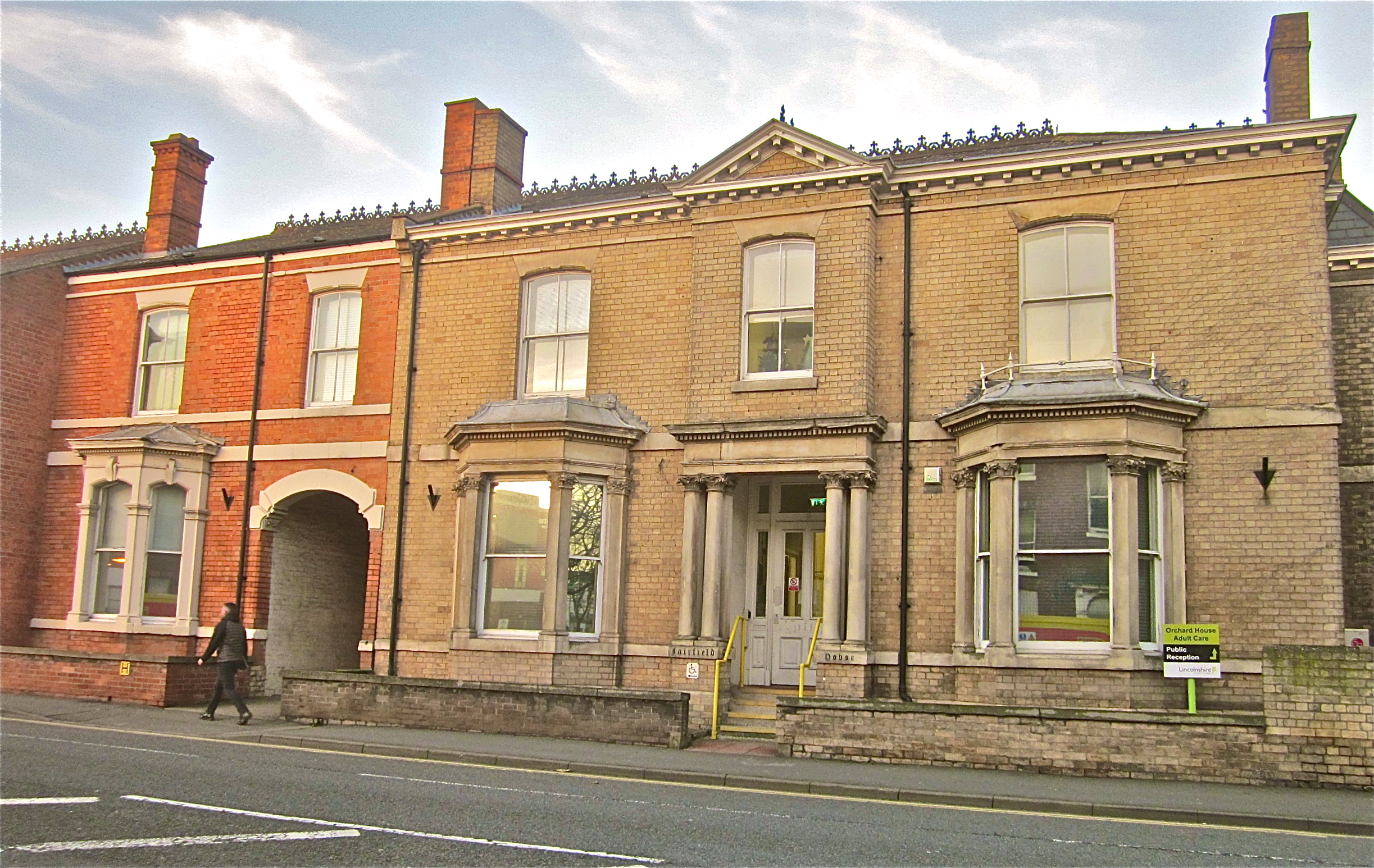
45-49 Newland, Lincoln

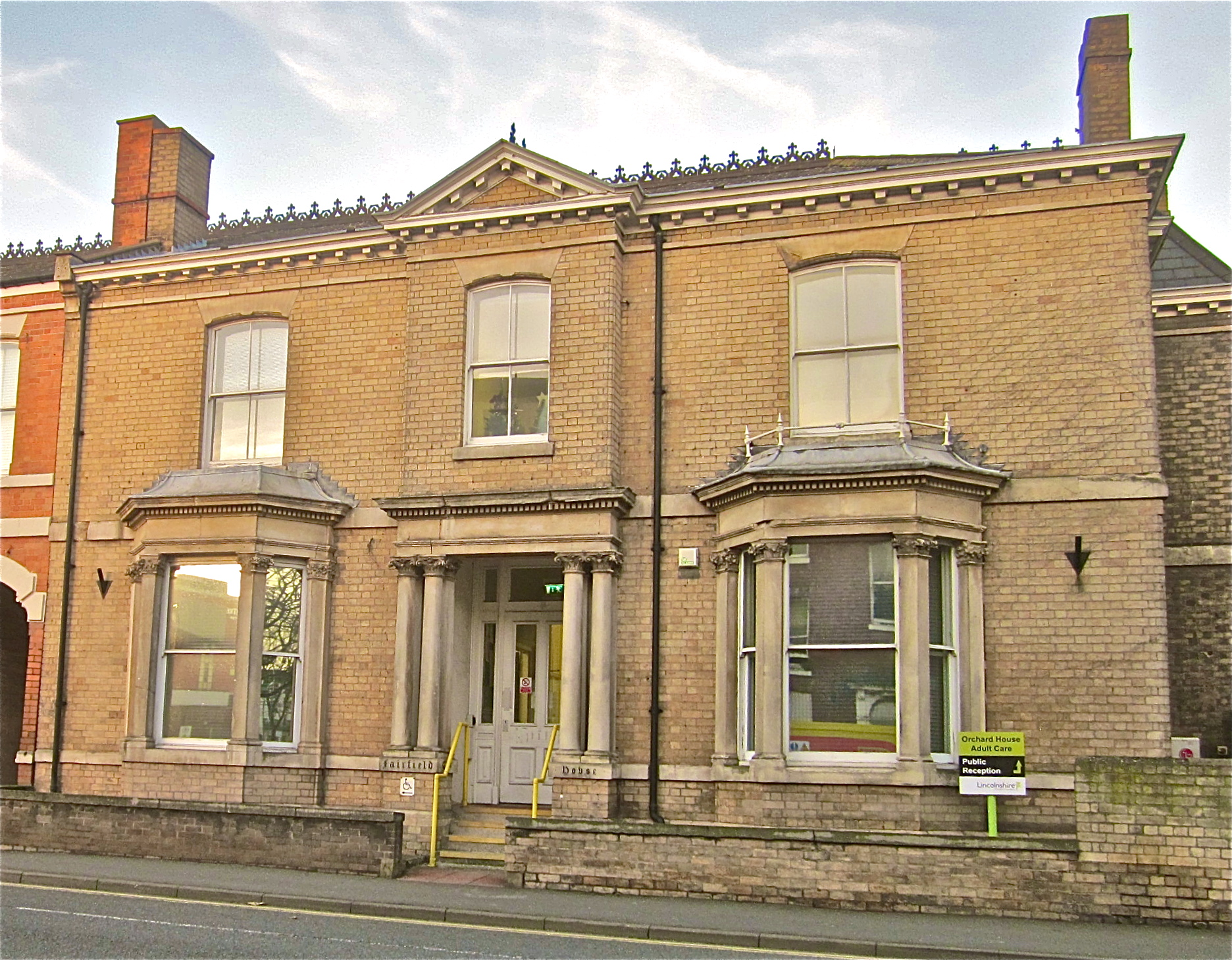
Fairfield House, Newland Lincoln

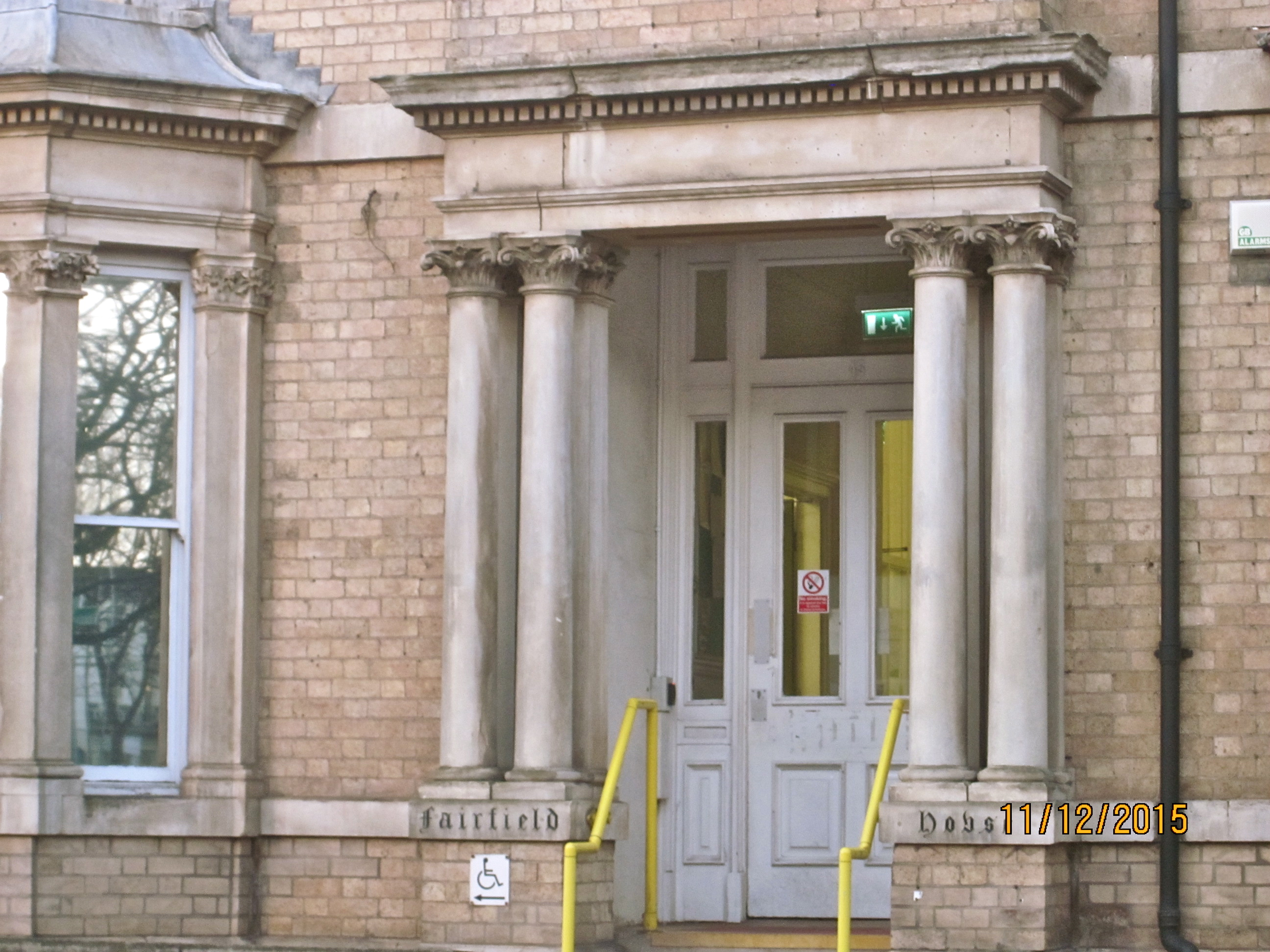
Newland Lincoln

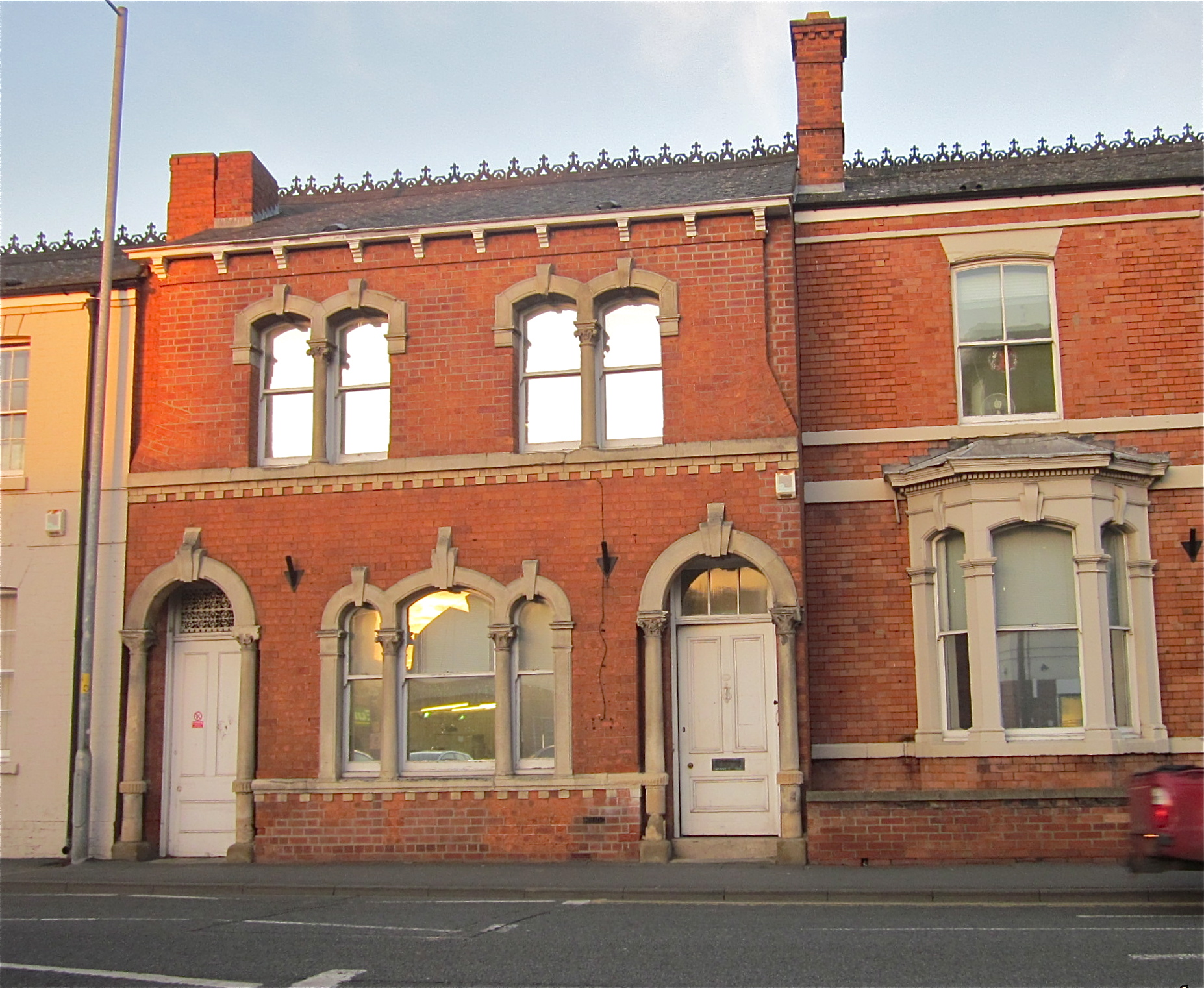
Newland Lincoln

=== Schools ===
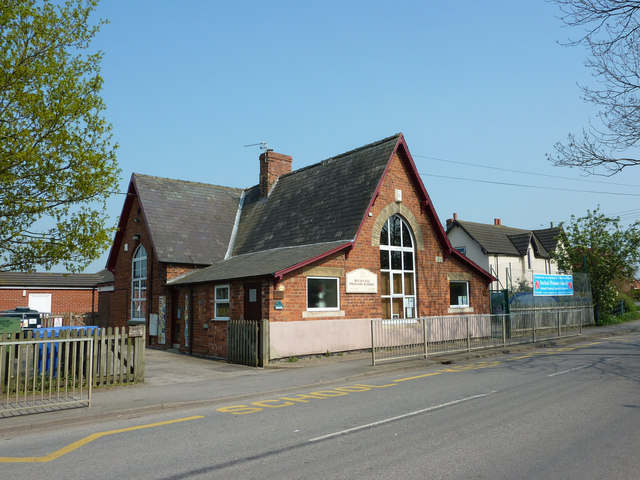
Bucknall Primary School - 1855

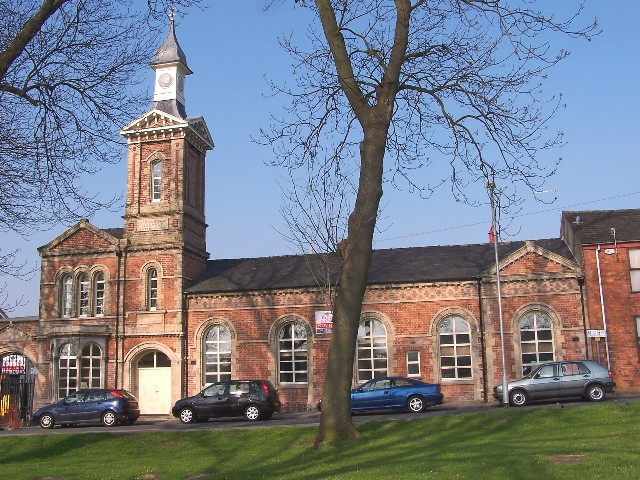
The Old Methodist School Rosemary Lane, Lincoln, 1859

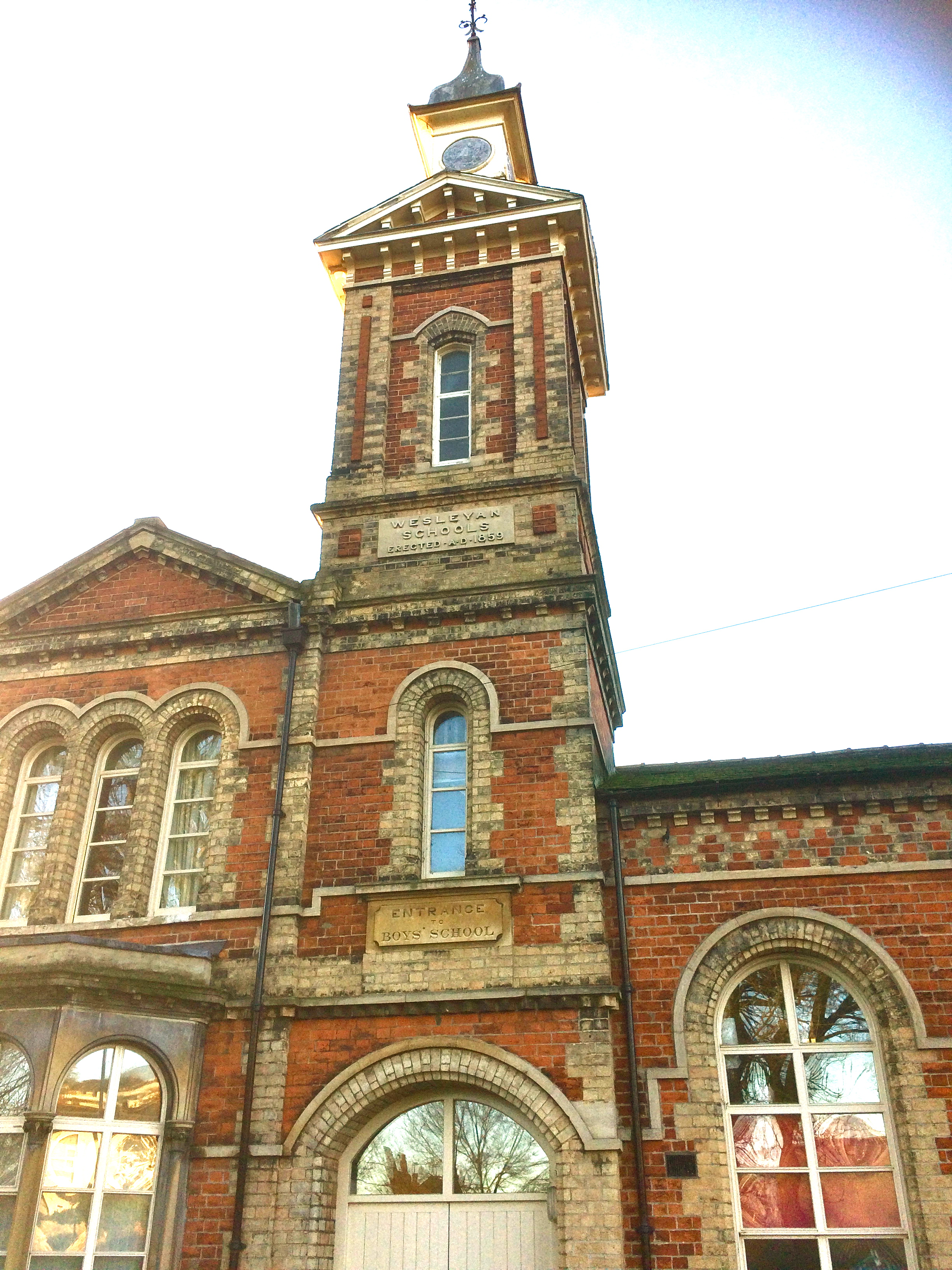
Wesleyan Day Schools, Lincoln Tower with decorative brickwork

- Bucknall, Lincolnshire National School. 1855.
- Wesleyan School, Bassingham.1856.
- Wesleyan Day School, Burgh le Marsh, Lincolnshire. (1856). In June Bellamy and Hardy advertised that "PERSONS desirous of CONTRACTING for the BUILDING of NEW WESLEYAN DAY SCHOOL and MASTER'S RESIDENCE Burgh Marsh may see Plans and Specifications at the Office of Messrs. Bellamy and Hardy, architects, Lincoln". The school was built, but is not noted in 1896.
- Wesleyan School, Bardney. (1856) In June Bellamy and Hardy advertised for tenders: "To BUILDERS and CONTRACTORS. PERSONS willing to TENDER for the ERECTION and CONSTRUCTION of SCHOOL with CLASS-ROOMS and MASTER'S RESIDENCE and other Works connect therewith, proposed to be built at BARDNEY". The School was completed by December. It continued as a school until 1965 when it was merged with the present primary school. The school building survives in a much altered state.
- Wesleyan School, Grantham Street, Lincoln (1856). Adjacent to the "Big" Wesley Chapel on the south side of Grantham Street with Danesgate on East. Apparently rebuilt in 1870 .
- Wesleyan Day School, Newmarket, Louth. This school was to continue in use until the early 1970s.
- Wesleyan Day Schools, Rosemary Lane, Monk's Road, Lincoln (1859). With patterned red and white brick. Tower with cupola.
- The Victoria Wesleyan Day School, Grimsby (1857). Wesleyan Day School. Foundation stone laid March 1857. The cost was £2242 and a government grant of £1050 was received.

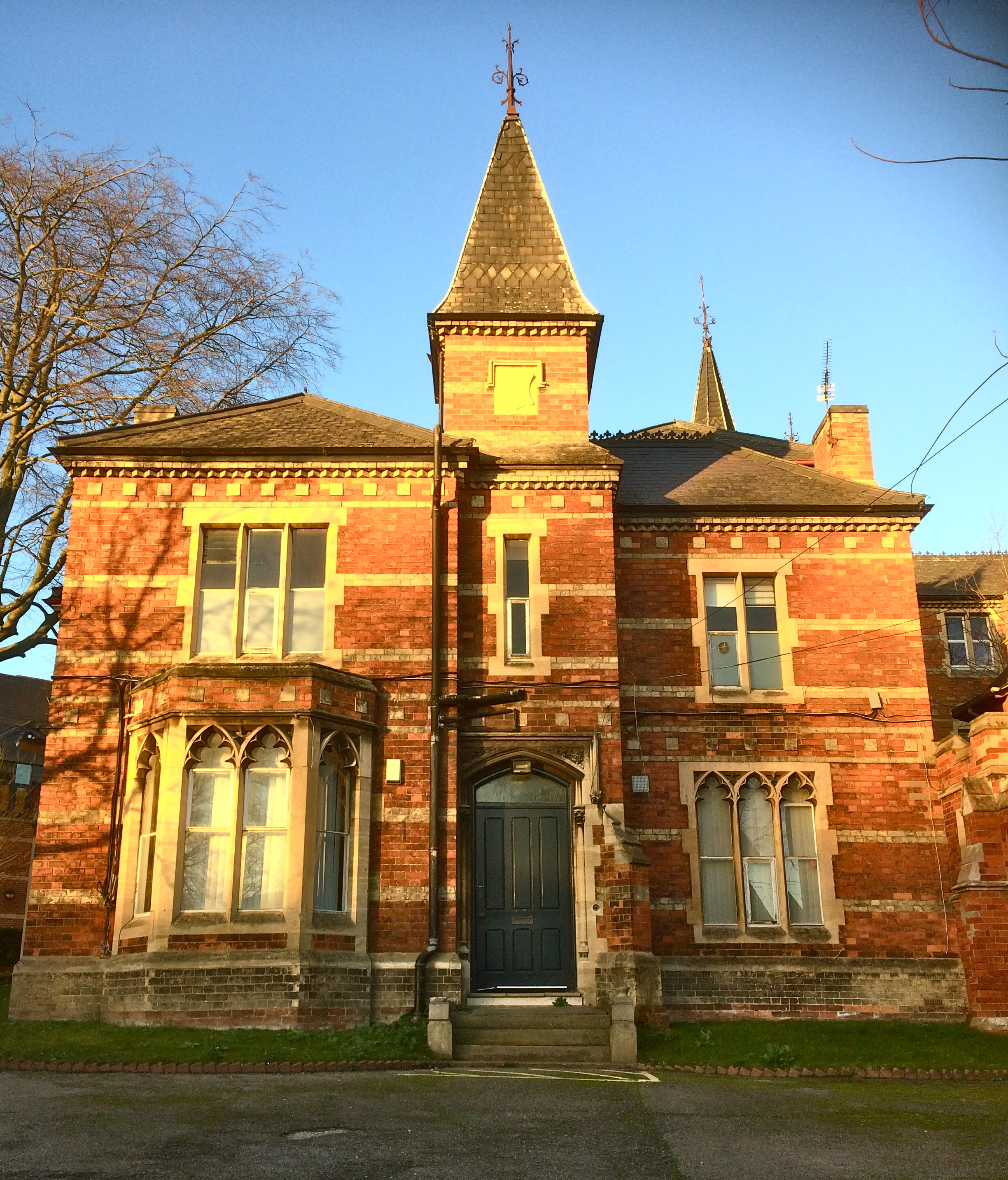
Headmaster's House, Old Lincoln Grammar School

- Headmaster's House and Boarding House, Lincoln Grammar School, Upper Lindum Terrace, Lincoln (1861 with additions 1866). Bellamy and Hardy's plans were approved by the Visitors of the Grammar School in November 1860 and the building costs were estimated at £1850. Tudor Gothic, tower with short spire. Red brick with yellow brick stringing. Crested ridge tiles. The original boarding house is to the north-east of this building. Later buildings to the south by William Watkins. The Grammar School moved to a new site on Wragby Road in 1905 and this building is now part of the Minster school.

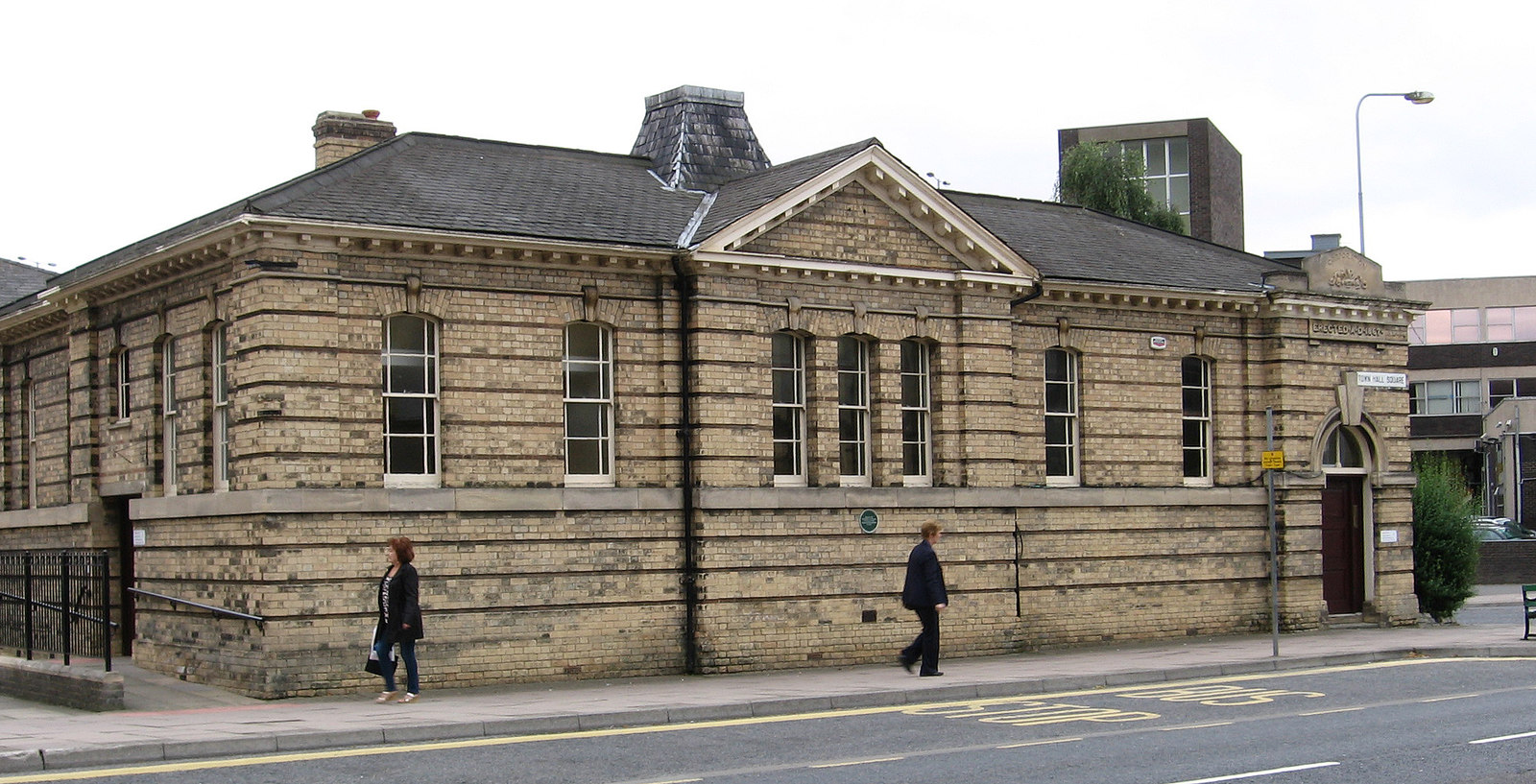
Grimsby – former Corporation Grammar School, 1861-3

- Corporation Grammar School, Grimsby. 1861-3 by Bellamy and Hardy. Edward VI granted a licence for the first Free Grammar School in Grimsby in 1547. Edward's licence led to the Corporation Free Grammar, which was located alongside the new Town hall, Courthouse and Police station. It was designed to hold 100 students. In 1895 the Winteringham School or Grimsby Municipal College in Eleanor Street was opened, which took over the functions of the Grammar School.

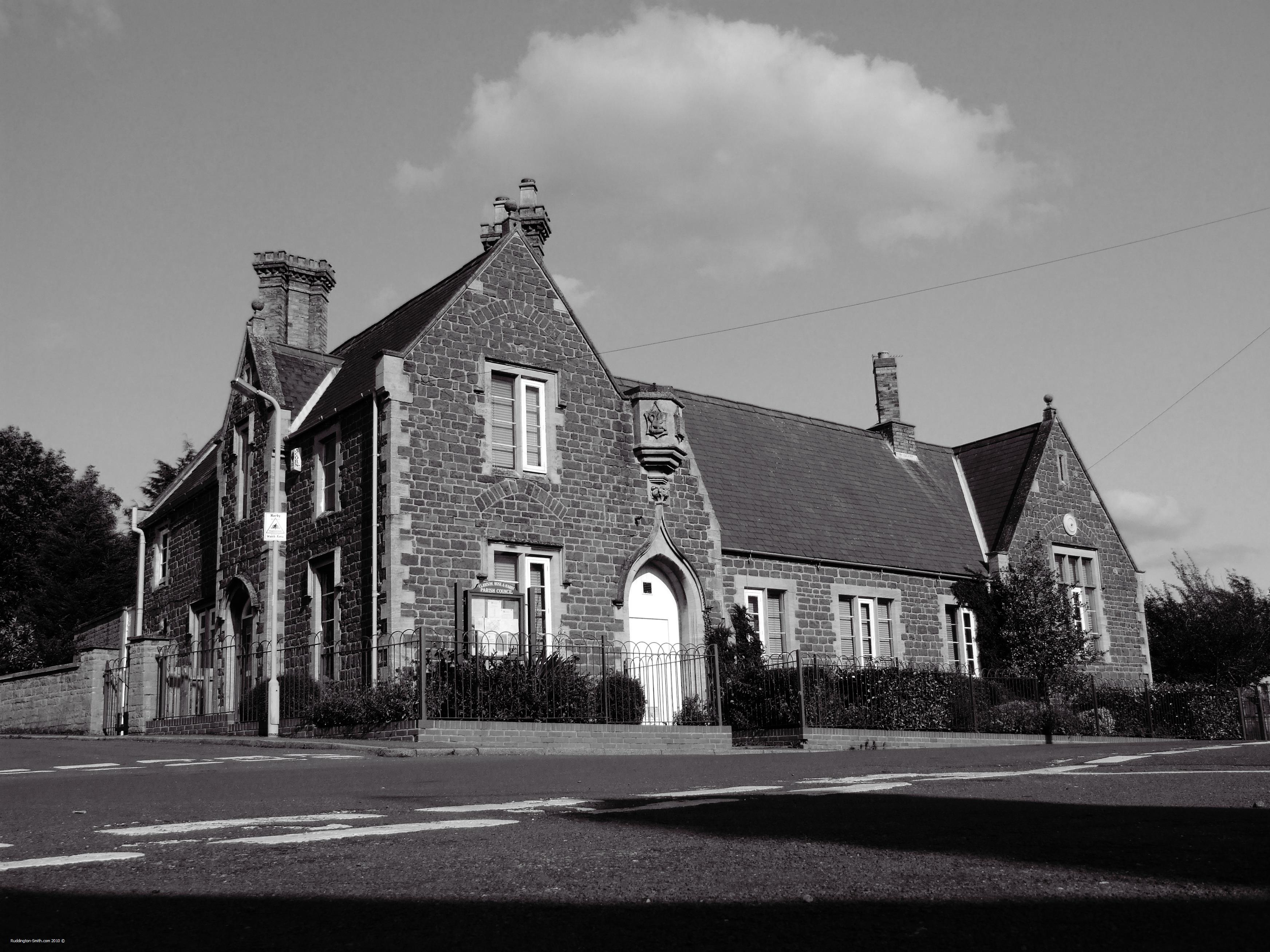
Harby Church of England Primary School

School in 1895

- Harby Church of England School, School Lane, Harby., Leicestershire. (1861) Ironstone, with limestone dressings, slate roof and white brick stacks. Single-storeyed school with a two-storey school house. Right cross wing projects slightly and has chamfered stone mullion and transom windows. The schoolhouse has a front porch and Gothic-arched doorway with wave and hollow chamfers and ogee hood mould. Former base to bell turret with reliefs of Pelican in her Piety on left and open book on right. The base formerly supported a timber bell-cote with a slate-hung spire.
- Northampton Grammar School. In 1870, additional premises designed by Bellamy and Hardy were opened in Abington Square to educate a further 200 pupils. This was closed in 1911 when both premises were amalgamated and moved to the outskirts of Northampton.
- Normanby by Spital (1877–78). United District Board School and Master's House. The school cost £1500 and could accommodate 130 children. Now Normanby by Spital Primary School. The building has a double gabled master's house with a ten bay schoolroom facing the road, with a central two bayed gable with bargeboards.
- Spalding School Board. (1878) Plans estimated at £3000 were approved for the Westlode Road School.
- Keelby Board School, Lincolnshire. (!878-9). School built at the cost of £1500 for 150 pupils, together with a master's house. The master's house is still standing but the school has been demolished.
- United Methodist Methodist Free Church, Sunday Schools. Portland Street, Lincoln. (1883)
- Wildmore Fen United District Board School, Hundle House, Thornton Fen, Lincolnshire. (1880). Board school and Master's House. It became Wildmore Council School in 1903 and Wildmore County School in 1947. In 1956 it was renamed New York County School and is now New York Primary School.

=== Churches and church restoration ===
- St Luke's church, Humberstone Road, Leicester. A new parish created in 1867 and the church by Bellamy and Hardy was completed the following year. The church, which had 700 seats, was altered in 1892, but was demolished in May 1950 and the parish disbanded.
- St Peter's church, Middle Rasen, dates from the 12th century, and an 1860 restoration by Pearson Bellamy and John Spence Hardy included the re-building of the north aisle.

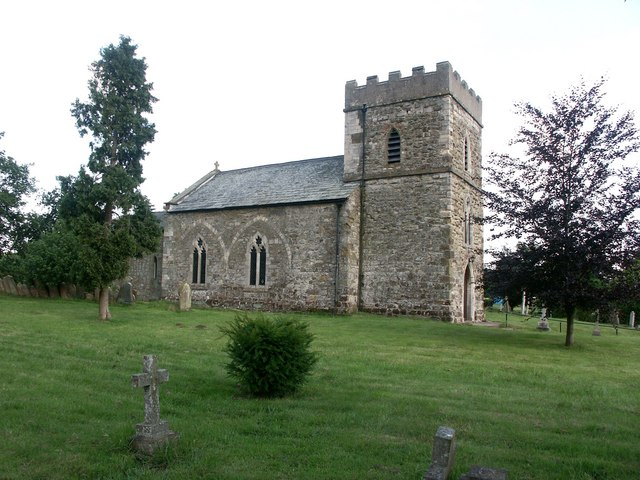
St Andrew, Donington on Bain - geograph.org.uk - 430508

- St Andrew's church Donington on Bain. The church was extensively restored by Pearson Bellamy in 1865-68. TheLouth and North Lincolnshire Advertiser records that the parish of Donninington was a very poor one, and dissent predominates; therefore we shall be glad to hear of churchmen in other parts of the diocese responding to the appeal the Rector of Donington has made to the public, to enable him to re-build his parish church, and so wipe off from the face of the land unsightly ecclesiastical abomination.

=== Non-Conformist chapels and churches ===
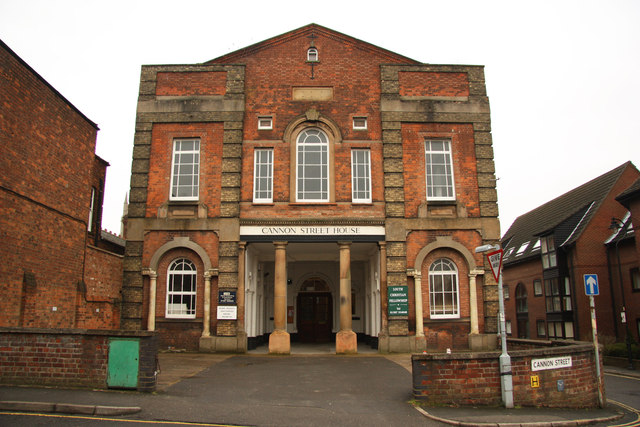
Cannon Street House Former Baptist Chapel and School Room.

- General Baptist Chapel, Cannongate, Louth. Enlarged by Pearson Bellamy in 1850/1 as a Sunday School.

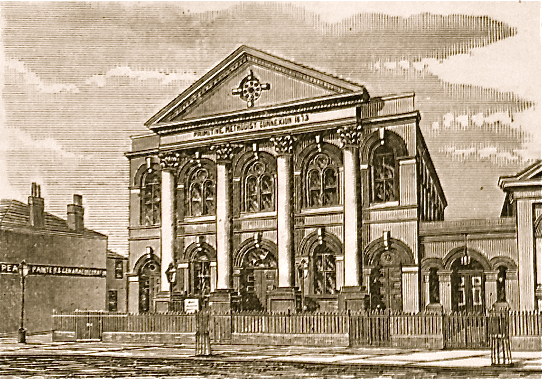
Louth Free Methodist Chapel

- Louth Free Methodist (Later United Methodist) chapel, Eastgate, Louth (1854/55) Classical facade with massive double Corinthian columns supporting a pediment. Fronted with elaborated cast iron railings. The chapel could seat 1,200 people and cost £2,360. The chapel was opened on 31 December 1854. It was closed in 1956 and was subsequently demolished.

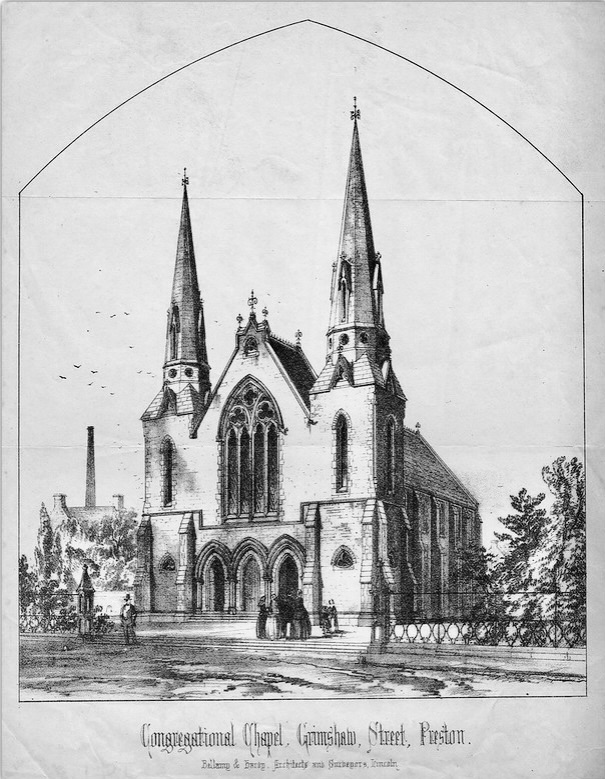
Congregational Chapel, Grimshaw Street, Preston. 1857

- Preston, Lancashire, Grimshaw Street Congregational Chapel, (1857) Later the United Reformed Church and now Seventh-day Adventist church. Restored 2013.

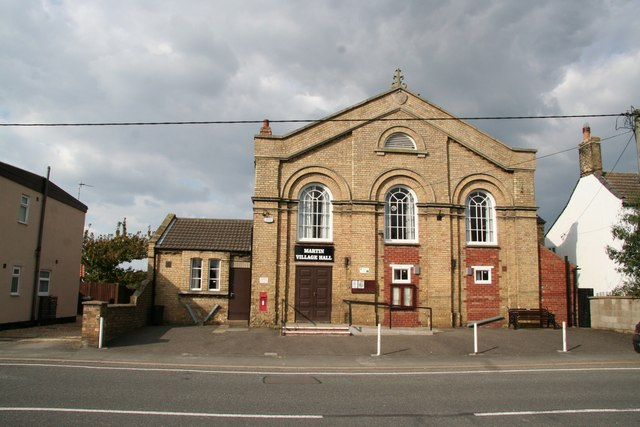
Martin Wesleyan Chapel 1860

- Wesleyan Methodist Chapel, Martin by Timberland. (1860). Yellow brick chapel designed by Bellamy and Hardy and erected by John Bavin of Metheringham. Now Martin parish hall.

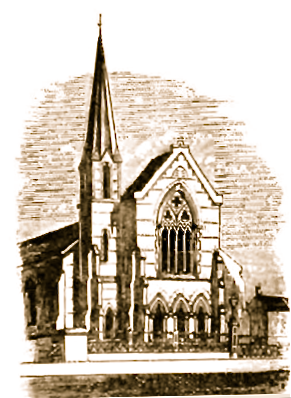
Victoria Chapel, Grimsby 1860

- Victoria Methodist Chapel, Cleethorpe Road, Grimsby. (1860) Opened 27 September 1860. Built by a John Brown at a cost of about £3,000. Gothic, with a tower surmounted by a spire. Large decorated style window. Part survived as the Grimsby Employment exchange.
- Market Rasen Free Methodist Chapel (1860). Tenders sought by Bellamy and Hardy for building the chapel. Union street chapel. Pedimented frontage with colonnades. Demolished c.2016.
- Newport Free Methodist Chapel, Saxon Street/Rasen Lane, Lincoln (1863) The exact position of this building has not been located. In January 1863 the foundation stone was laid and a tender for £857 for building the chapel was accepted.

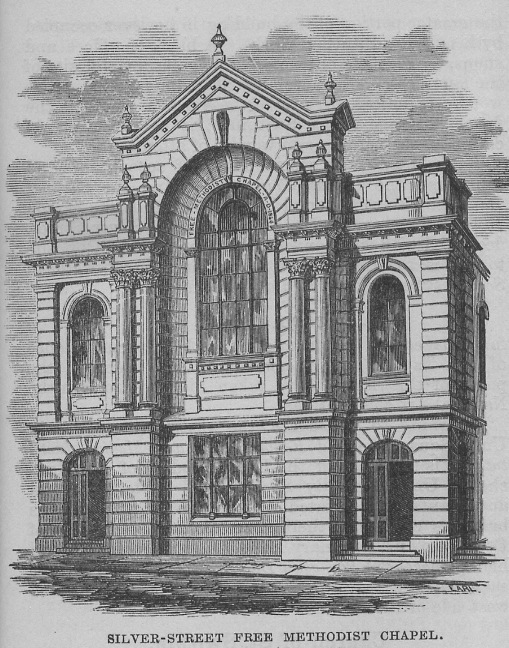
Silver Street Free Methodist Chapel, Lincoln

- Zion Chapel, Silver Street, Lincoln (1864) The Zion Chapel, originally Countess of Huntingdon's Connexion first erected in 1805. The chapel had a maximum congregation of 200 people. The various sects which adopted a more extreme Methodist position than the Wesleyans, sometimes subscribing to Calvinism, form a distinct group within the Methodist family. The earliest such community in Lincoln was established under the patronage of the Countess of Huntingdon in the 1770s, but no chapel seems to have been built until 1802. This chapel was built on the Zion Chapel site in Silver Street. By 1851 the Zion Chapel community had been joined by the ‘United’ or ‘Free’ Methodists’ and in 1864 the chapel was rebuilt again, this time to designs by Bellamy and Hardy. Pevsner in 1956 described it as "in white brick with debased Renaissance style. An odd and lively arrangement. Coupled columns flanking a big niche with a pediment 'flouting' out of the parapet above".
- Stallingborough Wesleyan Chapel. (1864/5). The foundation stone was laid on 4 August 1864 and opened for worship in March 1865. The chapel provided seating for 259 worshippers and cost around £850.
- Wesleyan Chapel and School at Sedburgh, Yorkshire (1864). The foundation stone for the chapel was laid on 16th. August 1864. It was stated that "the chapel is to be built of stone. The form is octagonal, and the style of architecture early English. will contain nearly sittings, and the school will accommodate scholars. The architects are Messrs. Bellamy and Hardy, Lincoln; the contractors, Messrs. and Wildman, Lancaster. The building is to be completed by the end of March, 1865."

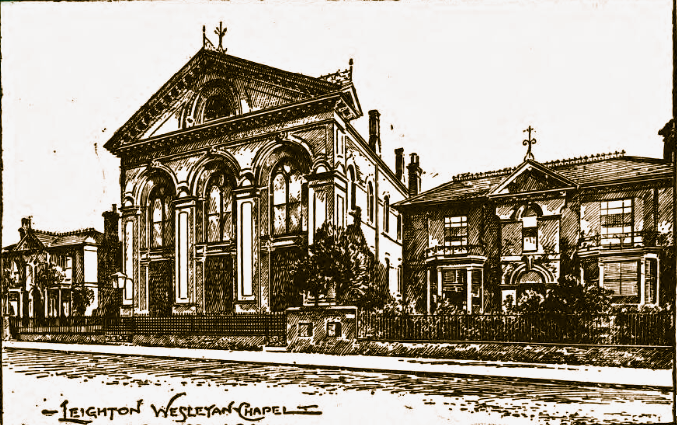
Leighton Buzzard Methodist Chapel in 1895

- Weselyan Methodist Chapel, Hockcliffe Road, Leighton Buzzard. Opened in March 1865, following the sale of land adjacent to the Leighton Buzzard Corn Exchange. A Manse was built next to it. Bellamy and Harding employed Messrs Hobson and Taylor of Hogsthorpe in Lincolnshire as builders. The style of architecture was described as "purely Italian". The chapel facade was heavily pedimented above three tall arched windows and the manse also had advanced central bay with a similar pediment. The chapel had seating for 1,400 people and a school room beneath which would hold nearly 600 pupils. The chapel and the manse were demolished in 1972
- Primitive Methodist Chapel, West Street, Boston, Foundation stone laid in April 1865. The Lincolnshire Chronicle wrote in at the same time "The Primitive Methodists ... have commenced the erection of a new place worship in West street. The site is certainly very eligible one, and judging the plans of the new structure we have no hesitation saying that it will not only be great ornament to the neighbourhood, but the first specimen chapel architecture in Boston. The style is nearly pure Italian and when the building is completed it will be another monument added to the many already in existence in the county, of the skill and taste of the architects, Messrs. Bellamy and Hardy, of Lincoln." The chapel opened on 1 March 1866, but in 1898 was largely destroyed by fire. Part of the frontage survives. A print of the original building exists.
- Wesleyan Chapel, Goulceby, Lincolnshire (1866). The Louth and North Lincolnshire Advertiser reported "A series of services have recently been held in connection with the opening of a new chapel, at Goulceby, in the Louth circuit. The chapel itself is pronounced be most complete in all its parts, and will seat 350 persons, the entire cost being £700. Messrs. Bellamy and Hardy, of Lincoln, were the architects, and Mr. J. M. Thompson, of Louth, the builder."

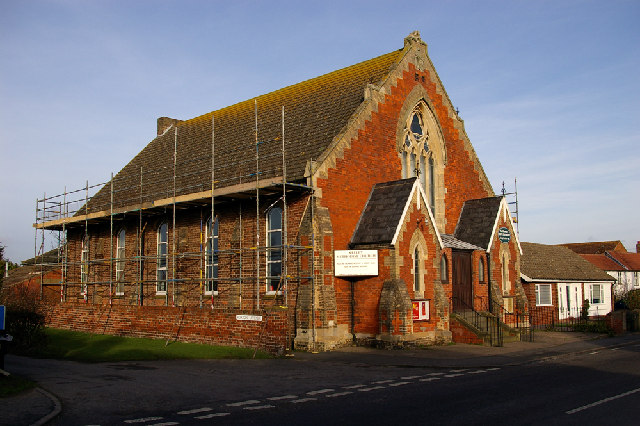
Keelby Methodist Church 1866

- Wesleyan Chapel, Keelby, Lincolnshire. (1866). Red brick chapel with yellowish brick flashings. Prominent gothic tracery window on facade facing road.

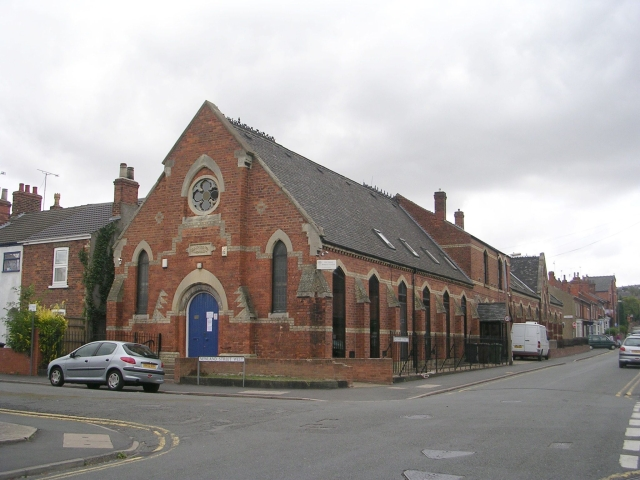
Former Congregational Mission Church- Newland Street West/ Gresham Street 1866-7)

- Congregational Mission Church and associated buildings Corner of Newland Street and 23 Gresham Street. (1866–67) Red bricks with pointed arch windows and yellow brick string running the length of the building and forming voussoir over windows. A manse is set adjacent to the Chapel on Gresham Street. In 1891 Pearson Bellamy designed two schoolrooms which faced Gresham Street and continued to the corner with Allison Street. The schoolrooms are built in brick in a similar Gothic style with the yellow brick stringing continuing from the chapel and manse.
- Chapel to be erected in Grantham (1868). This is very probably the United Free Methodist Chapel in Chapel Street, Little Gonerby which opened in 1868 and closed in 1956.

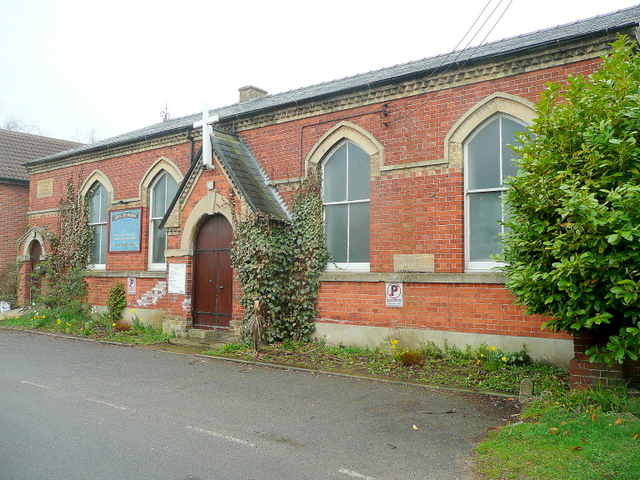
Wesleyan Methodist Shapel, Swinderby

- Wesleyan Chapel at Hackthorn, Lincolnshire. (1869). Bellamy and Hardy advertised Stamford Mercury in April 1869 "To BUILDERS. PERSONS desirous of TENDERING for the ERECTION of a WESLEYAN CHAPEL at Hackthorne, near the City of Lincoln, may inspect the Drawings and Specifications from April 30 to May 7 inclusive, 1869"
- Wesleyan Chapel and Schoolroom, Swinderby, Lincolnshire (1869). The foundation stone was laid in June 1869. The Stamford Mercury notes "The design is by Messrs. Bellamy and Hardy, architects, Lincoln. It is a neat edifice in the semi-Gothic style, built of brick, with stone dressings. It contains at the east end a schoolroom capable of accommodating about 100 children, while the chapel will seat at a pinch 400 persons".
- New York Wesleyan Methodist Church, Dogdyke Road, Wildmore. (1872) The Wildmore chapel closed in 2004 and has subsequently been converted into a house. The building is of red brick and has a gabled roof. It has yellow brick window arches with stone hood mouldings, and large stone keystones on windows to frontage. It has a raised gable with stone coping and decorative yellow brickwork.
- Wesleyan Methodist Chapel, Main Road, Sibsey Lincolnshire The chapel in Sibsey was built in 1874 by Bellamy and Hardy. According to Pevsner it was of red brick in the Gothic style, with yellow brick and stone dressings. According to OS maps the chapel survived until at least 1974, after which it was demolished.

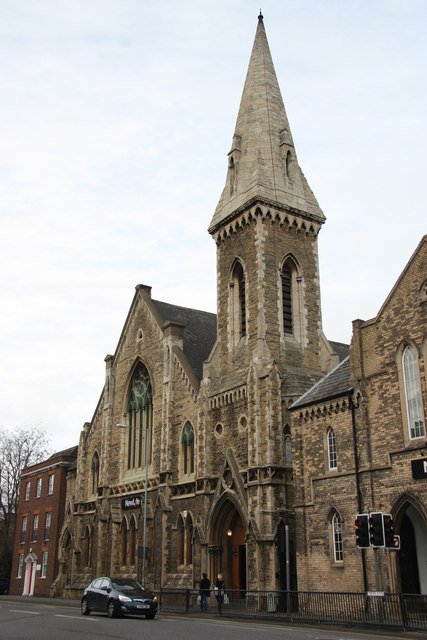
Newland Congregational Chapel, Lincoln.

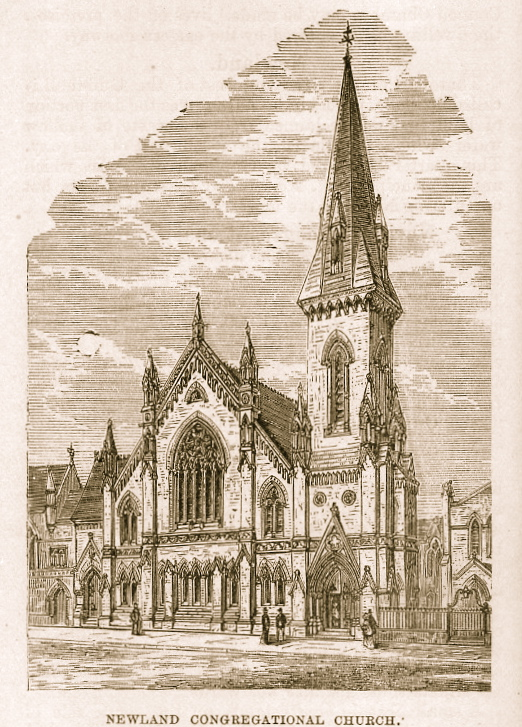
Newland Congregational Chapel, Lincoln

- Lincoln, Newlands Congregational Church, 1874-6 Grade II* listed. Gothic with a broach spire. Grey and red brick and ashlar, with stone dressings and gabled and hipped slate roof. South end has gabled buttresses defining the aisles. In the centre five single lancets and 2 intermediate gabled buttresses. Beyond, on either side, three lancets. All have linked hoodmoulds. To left again, a moulded doorway with hoodmould, coped gableand niche above. Above, a central five light window with tracery. Red brick north gable has a wheel window with stone surround and tracery. East and west sides have buttresses and double and triple windows on each floor, with segmental pointed heads. South-east tower, two stages, gabled angle buttresses, machicolated bell stage and foliage frieze. Nave has five-bay arcades with iron piers, round below the gallery and clustered above, with foliage capitals, moulded arches and hoodmoulds. Panelled gallery around three sides, with vine trail frieze. All fittings removed in 1991, apart from original panelled benches in the gallery. At the time of the laying of the foundation stone in September 1874 it was noted that the "front of the new edifice will be faced with Yorkshire parpoints and Bath stone dressings. The new building, which will certainly be an ornament to the locality, will be in the transition early English character, comprising central gable, perforated parapet, and five light traceried windows with single light traceried windows beneath, divided by pinnacled buttresses &c. Over the wing to the right will be the tower spire, rising to a height of 120 feet. The interior is divided into a nave and two side aisles, formed by pillars and moulded arches. The ceiling will be formed into parallel apartments by molar ribs rising from richly carved corbels. The cost of the new building is estimated at between £7000 and £8000, the contractor being Mr. Thos. Loveiee, and the architects Messrs Bellamy and Hardy".
- Hannah Memorial Wesleyan Chapel, High Street, Lincoln (1875). In 1875, the Wesleyan Methodists built a large chapel on the High Street named after Thomas Hannah (but also known as ‘Little Wesley’). Three designs was for the Chapel were submitted in May 1873. The architects chosen were Bellamy and Hardy and the other competing architects were William Watkins of Lincoln and William Botterill of Hull. The chapel was demolished in 1965. The chapel was built constructed from brick and ashlar in the classical style; a five-bay frontage, three storeys high. Four pillars, complete with Corinthian capitals, all supporting a pediment with a central round arched window with scrolled frieze. The site is now occupied by the Thomas Cooper Memorial Baptist Church, built in 1973–1974 to a design by Frederick Gibberd and Partners.
- Kirkstead Wesleyan Methodist Chapel.(1875). Bellamy and Hardy advertised in February 1875 to for builders to construct a chapel in Kirkstead.

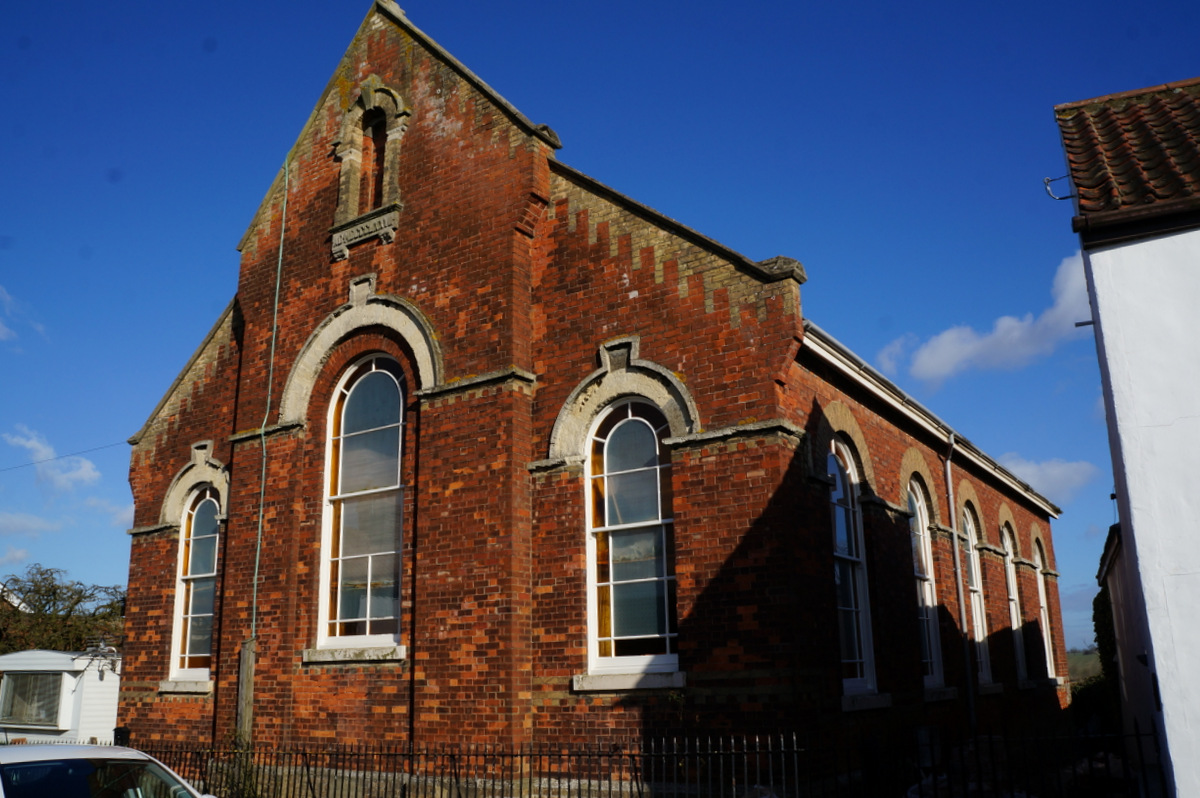
Former Chapel, Binbrook 1877.

- Binbrook Wesleyan Chapel, High Street, Binbrook (1877) The building was designed by Bellamy and Hardy of Lincoln and was built in 1877 and opened on 13 June 1878. It replaced a nearby and smaller chapel of 1816, which then became a Wesleyan school and Sunday School. The chapel remained in use until 2000 and was converted to a house in 2008
- West Ashby Wesleyan Methodist chapel. (1878). Described as a "handsome structure the late Early English character, built of red pressed bricks with Bath stone dressings".
- Spalding United Free Methodist Chapel, (1878–79).
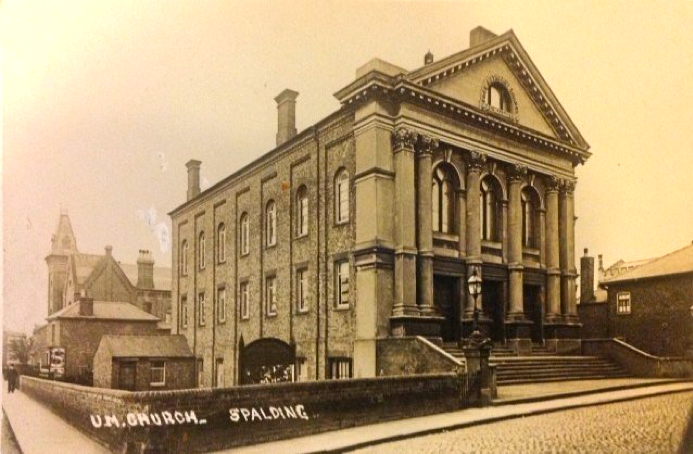
  Spring Garden Spalding Methodist Church
  . Corner of the Crescent and Spring Gardens. Stood until the reorganization of Methodism in Spalding in 1955 when it was demolished. Described by the Stamford Mercury as "The front is commanding, being set back and approached by few broad steps. The style of architecture is Italian, composed of semi-detached Corinthian columns with modillioned entablature and pediment over. Between the intercolumnations are three wide entrance doors with semi-circular headed windows over."

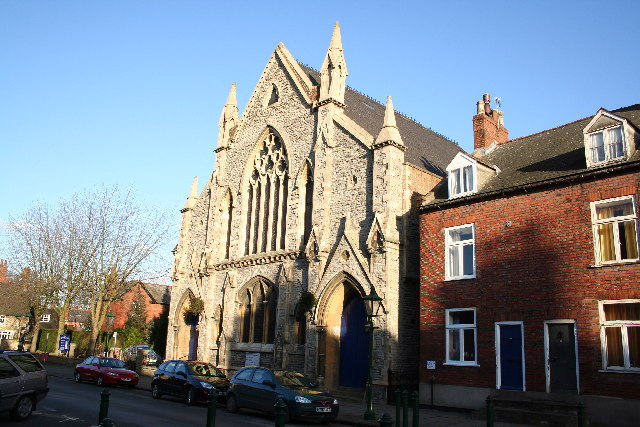
Bailgate Methodist Church, Lincoln, 1879

- Bailgate Methodist Church (1879) Bailgate, Lincoln. In a mixed gothic style, mainly in Early English style, but the large west window is in Decorated style

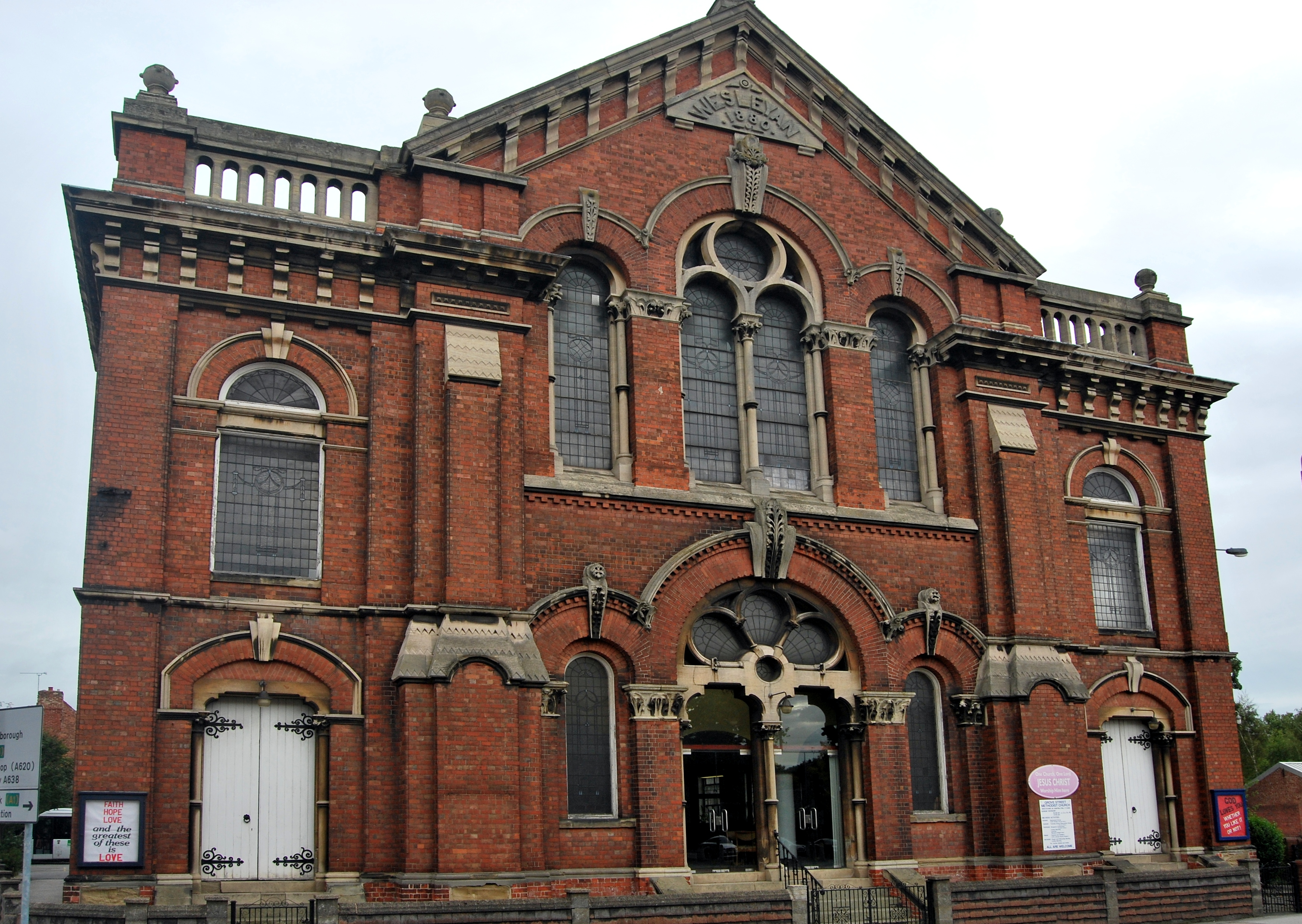
Grove Street Methodist Church, Retford, Nottinghamshire

- Grove Street Methodist Church, Retford (1880). "From whichever direction it is approached this building dominates the skyline." In 1879 the Chapel Trustees invited six architects to bid for the contract to build a grand, new chapel on Grove Street for the growing Methodist Congregation. Bellamy and Hardy were successful and the chapel opened in 1880. The chapel cost £6,000 to build. The building is brick with Anston stone mullions, dripstones, cornices, corbels and balustrades. It has a slate roof. It is of a classical design, two storeys in height, with a tripartite front elevation formed by a gabled centre flanked by square towers, each of which have balustraded parapets at roof level. There are coped and bracketed eaves in the gable apex and a date plaque upon which "Wesleyan 1880" is written in relief. Red brick with stone dressings and a slate roof.
- Methodist Mission Chapel, Portland Street, Lincoln. (1884).
- Wesleyan Methodist Chapel, Willingham by Stow, Lincolnshire (1885) Foundation stone laid on 17 June 1885. The chapel was to be "built of red and white brick, in the semi-Gothic style of architecture, and is intended to seat 130 persons. Messrs. Bellamy and Hardy, of Lincoln, are the architects, and Messrs. J. and T. Baines, of South Clifton, the builders. The cost of erection will be about £300."

=== Cemetery design and layout ===
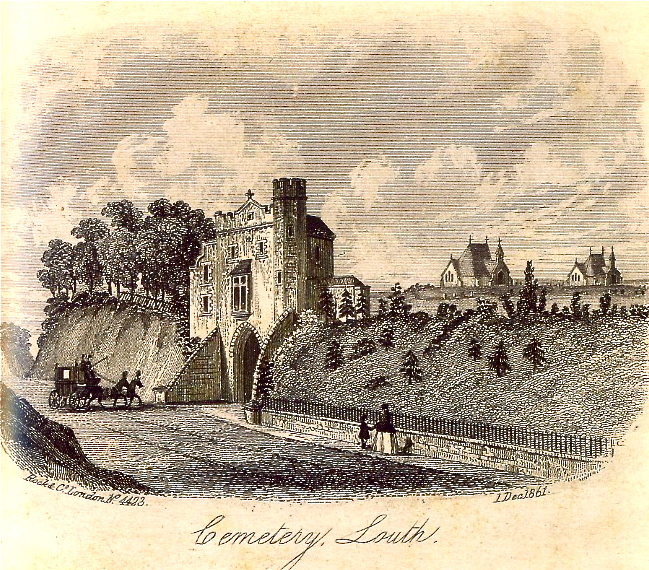
Louth Cemetery, Louth, Lincolnshire

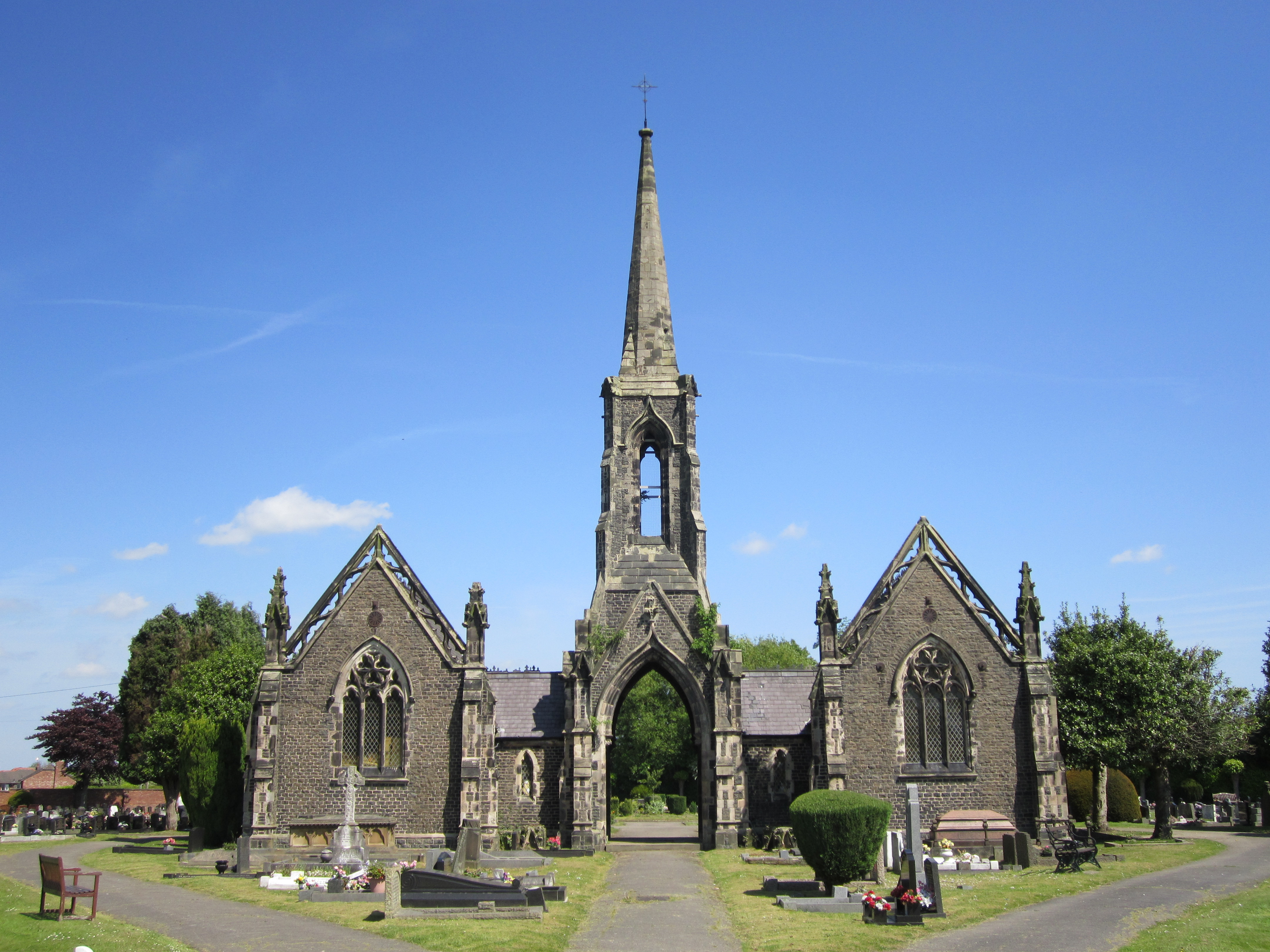
Middlewich Cemetery Chapel, Cheshire 1859

The provision of cemeteries by Town Councils which were separate from churchyards, largely came about as a result of the Burial Act 1854 (17 & 18 Vict c 87). It is one of the Burial Acts 1852 to 1885. The purpose of the 1854 Act purpose was to give provision for town councils to form burial boards to create and maintain cemeteries for parishes within their jurisdiction using funds from the Borough Rate. Following the passing of the Act during the next 30–40 years, very many new cemeteries were laid out. Bellamy and Hardy developed an expertise in cemetery design and layout for which they were awarded contracts in various parts of midland England. The design of the cemetery chapels is fairly standard with two side chapels linked by an arch which was surmounted by a spire. Pearson Bellamy's distinctive design for cemetery chapels appears to have arisen as a result of a dispute during the construction of his earliest cemetery chapels at Louth. Here he had designed two freestanding chapels, one for Anglicans and the other for Nonconformists, which were approached through a red brick Tudoresque tower. The vicar of Louth objected to this arrangement as he would have to step outside the chapel onto unconsecrated roadway to greet the funeral cortege. Eventually the chapel and a surrounding area for Anglican burials was consecrated by the Bishop of Lincoln in December 1855. The later design with two chapels either side of an arch solved this problem, and as result the design was widely adopted. At Stoke-on-Trent, Bellamy and Hardy were supposed only to have laid out the cemetery and a local architect supplied the plans, but as the chapels are typical of Bellamy and Hardy's work, this is unlikely to be the case. The Middlewich cemetery chapels and the Oakham cemetery chapels are identical, apart from a slight alteration to the design of the central arch. In the Lincoln cemetery on Canwick Road, Bellamy and Hardy laid out the cemetery, but another Lincoln architect, William Mortimer provided the plans for the cemetery chapels. However, the Lodge of 1856 for the adjacent New Cemetery on Washingborough Road was designed by Bellamy.

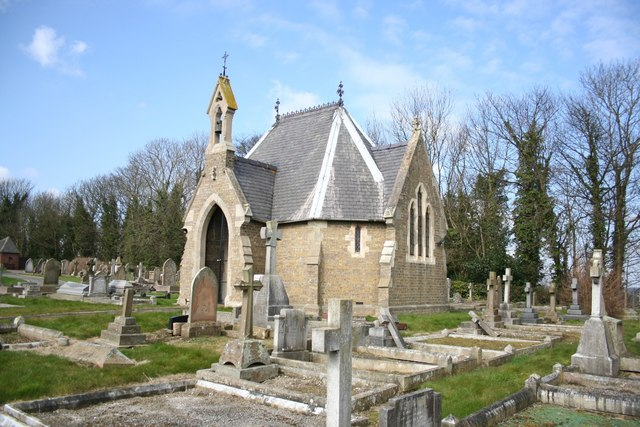
Louth Cemetery Chapel 1855

- Market Rasen Lincolnshire 1854. Two cemetery chapels
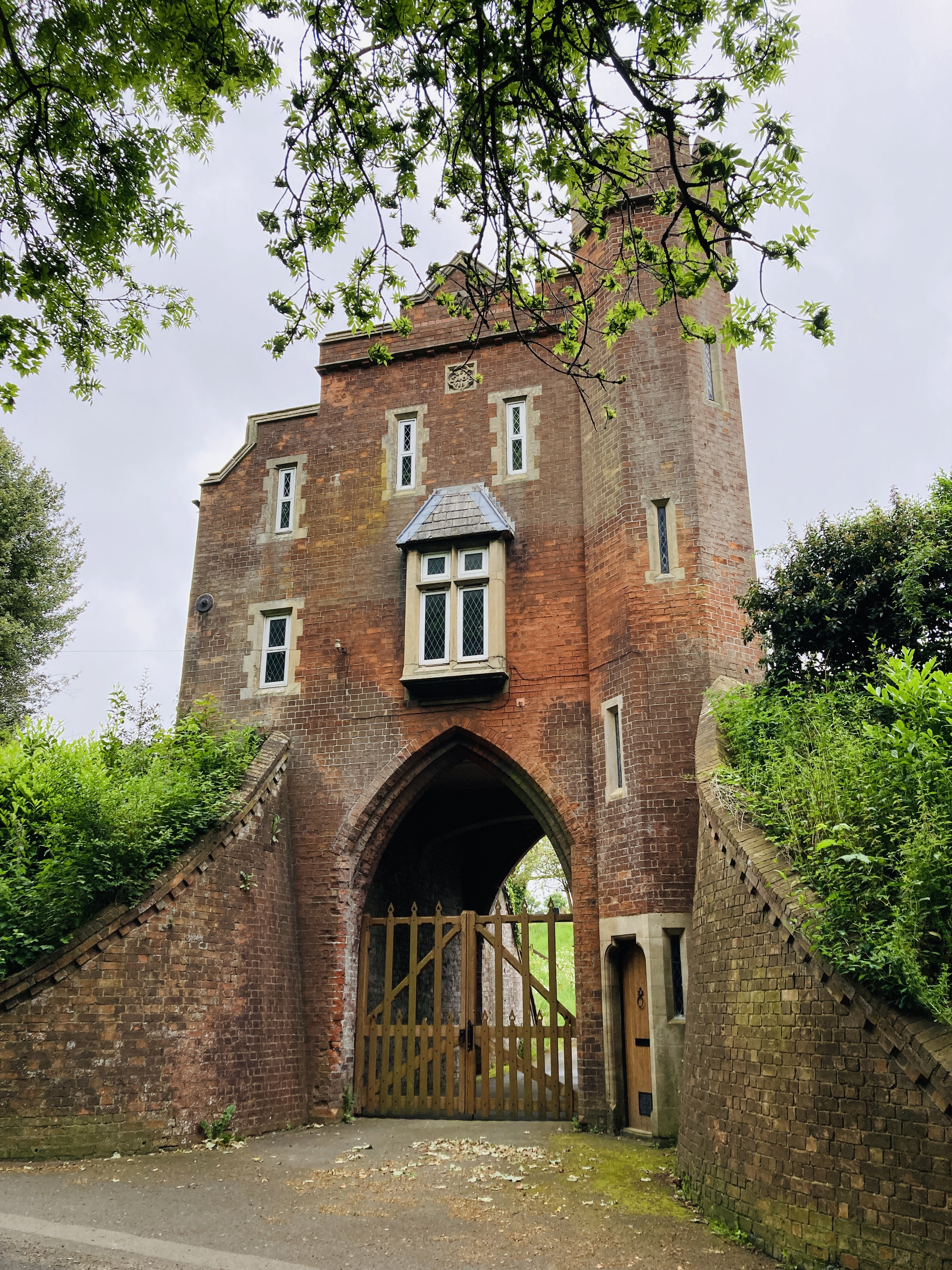
- The lodge house of 1855 at Louth Cemetery
  Louth, Lincolnshire. Linden Walk. 1855. Two chapels, one for Church of England and another for Dissenters. Brick with 'cut-away' corners and tall bellcotes over the porches. The two chapels and the gate lodge were completed for £2,700. The gatehouse lodge is in brick and stone dressings. A gothic arched carriageway running below the building. Tudoresque with octagonal tower with battlements. The building is entered at carriageway level through a door set in the tower. The central portion has an oriel window with an inset panel towards the top of the front elevation with the inscription 'ERECTED A.D. 185-' (the final numeral is now missing). The gatehouse was sold by Louth Town Council in 2019 and has now been brought back into domestic use.

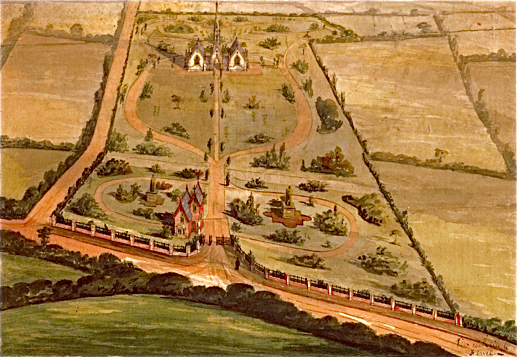
London Road Cemetery Newark, 1855 by Bellamy and Hardy

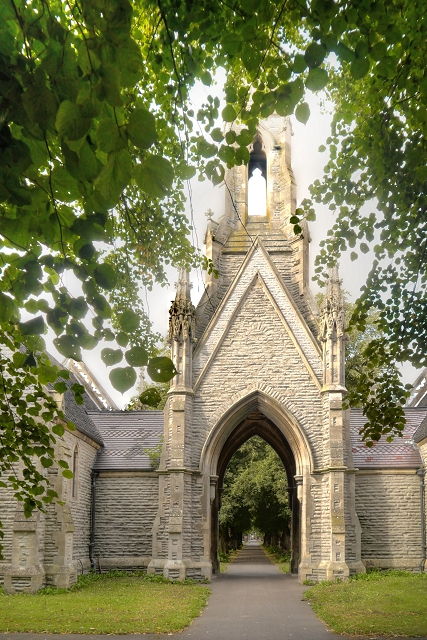
Cemetery Chapel, Newark-on-Trent 1856

- Newark-on-Trent. London Road Cemetery buildings, 1856. The Newark Burial Board in August 1855 invited designs, plans and specifications for "roads and paths, and laying out and planting a new Burial Ground, containing about 6½ acres, enclosing the ground, building a lodge, with entrance gates, building two chapels, …. the total cost of the whole not to exceed the sum of £2,000". Plans were submitted by 18 architects and those of Bellamy and Harding were selected. The cemetery was opened on 30 September 1856. The Gothic cemetery chapels were Bellamy and Hardy's standard design with two chapels, either side of a gate arch which was surmounted by a spire. The brick cemetery lodge had to be rebuilt in 1863.

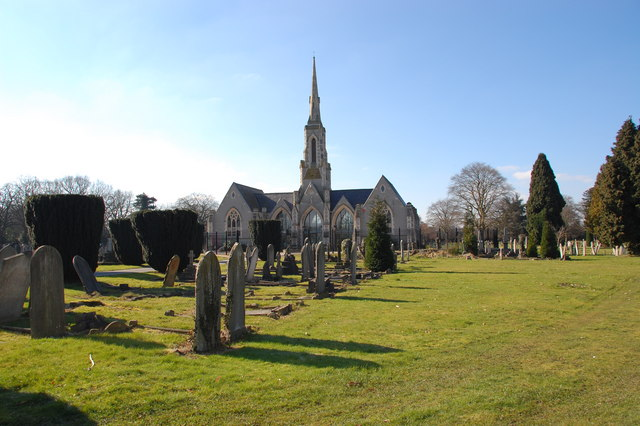
Cemetery Chapels Loughborough 1856-7

- Leicester Road Cemetery, Loughborough. 1856-7. Described by Pevsner as "the best cemetery buildings in the county." The lodge and two Gothic revival chapels are linked by a three arch loggia topped by an elaborate spire.
- Broadway Cemetery, Peterborough. Designed and laid out by Bellamy and Hardy in 1857. The cemetery has two entrances located at opposite ends of the site with a double set of stone gate piers. The entrances open onto a main avenue with paths leading off it creating a formal rectangular grid plan. The central avenue separated the consecrated area from the non-Conformist burial area. A spired arch over the road joined the two cemetery mortuary chapels. Both the chapels, a Church of England mortuary and a non-Conformist Mortuary Chapel were demolished in 1960. There are two lodges on the east side.

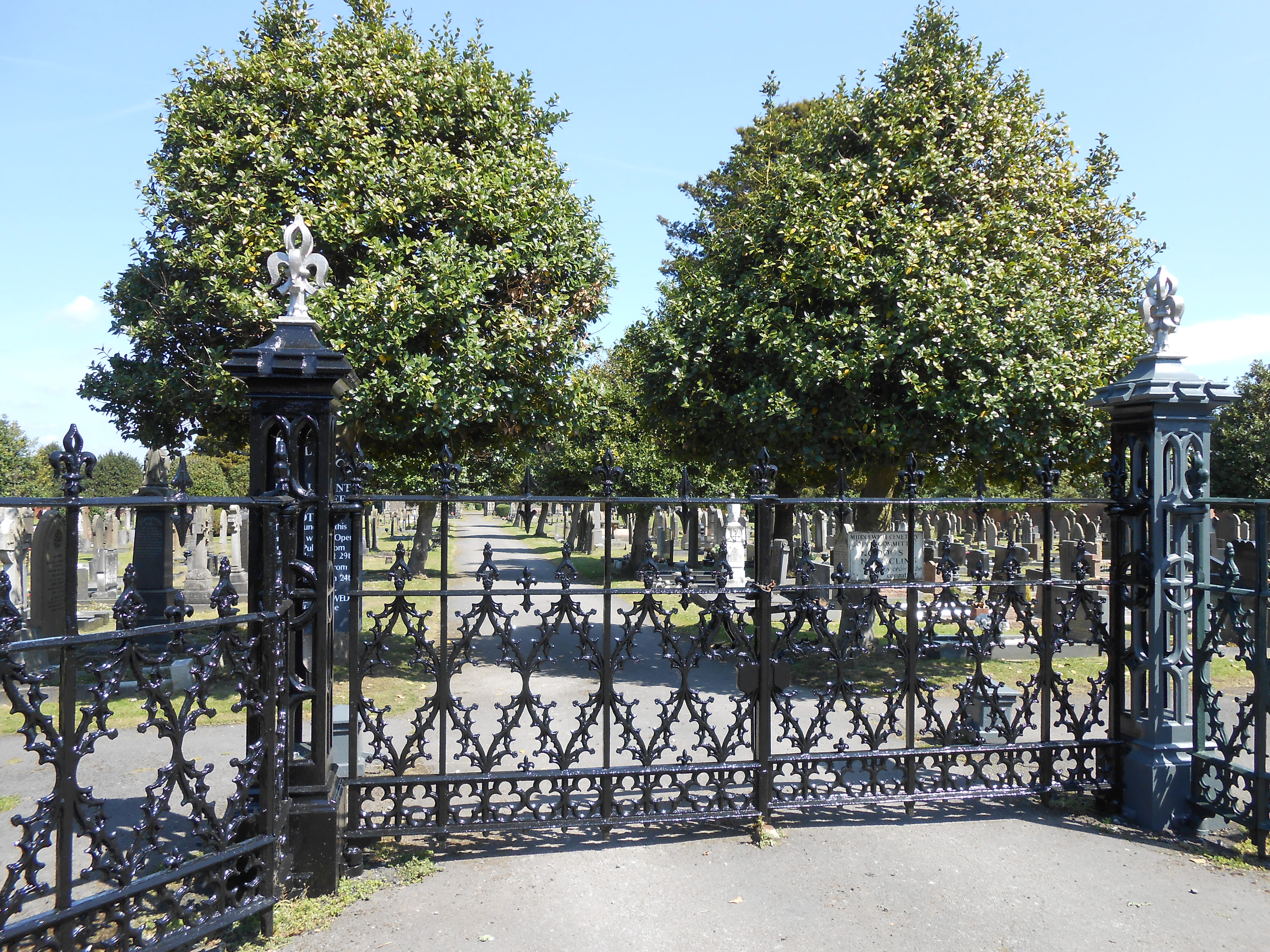
Middlewich Cemetery gates

- Middlewich, Cheshire. Middlewich (1859), Standard chapel design with a twin chapel separated by an archway with a spire over. Greystone block-work with pale stone dressing. The gates and railings are cast by Button of Crewe, but may have been designed by Bellamy.
- Oakham, Rutland. Kilburn Road. 1860. Standard chapel layout, with chapels either side of a carriage arch, surmounted by a spire. Coursed ironstone with paler ashlar dressings. The chapels are listed Grade II, and the attractive gate lodge with an arched gateway leading to the chapels is also listed.

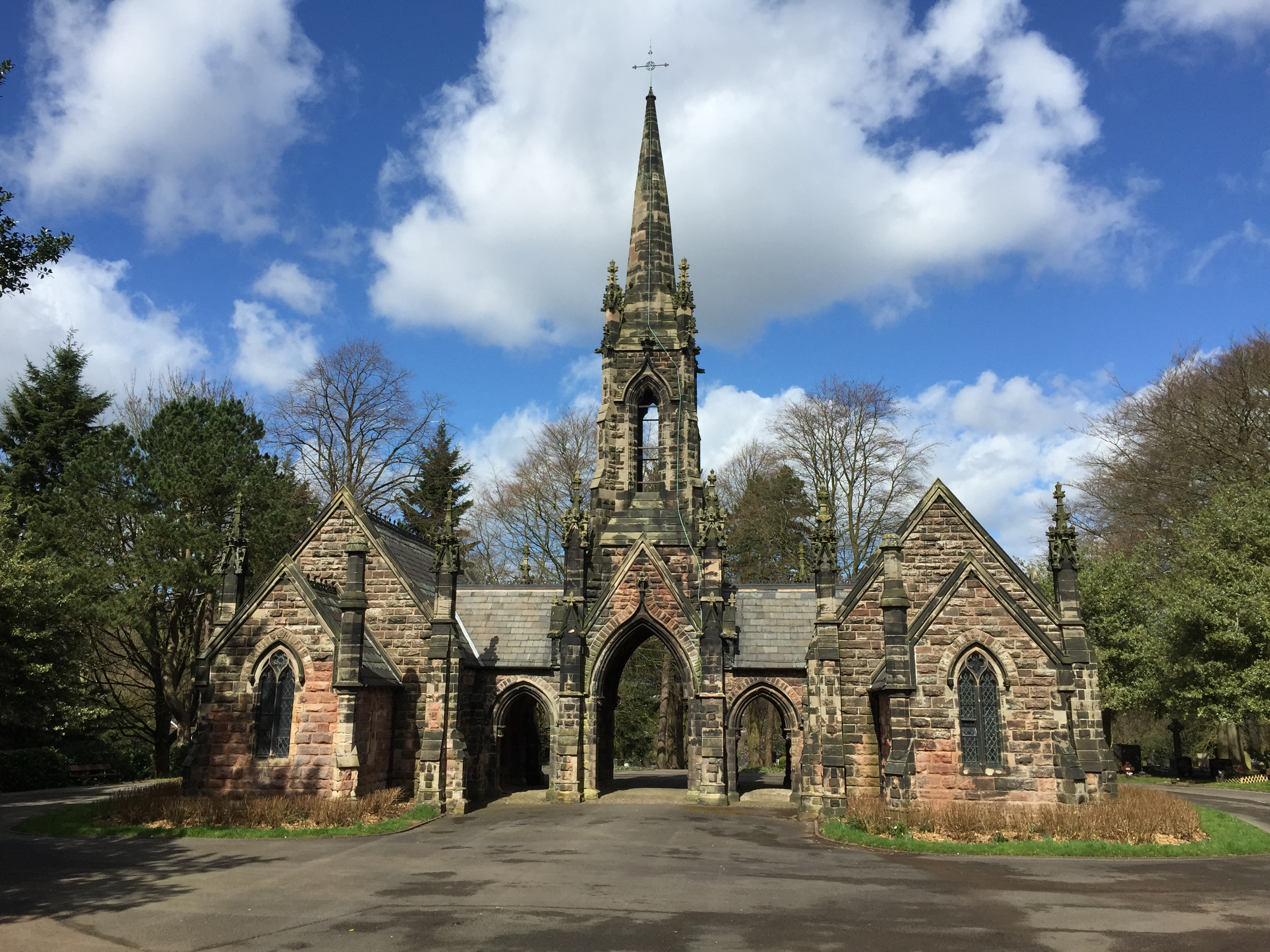
Newcastle-under-Lyme cemetery chapels, 1866

- Stoke-on-Trent, Cemetery Road, Hanley. (1860). There were 66 entries for a competition for designing the cemetery, as well as designs for the layout. The winning entries were Messrs. Ward and Son, architects of Hanley, for the chapels and lodges and Messrs. Bellamy and Hardy, of Lincoln, for laying out the grounds. The design of the chapels (but not necessarily the lodges) are typical of Bellamy's chapel designs, and the suspicion must be that the entry was split with a local architect to secure the contract.
- Lymewood Grove, Newcastle-under-Lyme. (1866) Symmetrical design with two chapels, with central entrance archway surmounted by tower. The central tower, with a brooch spire surmounts an ogee archway with angle buttresses and crocheted pinnacles. Rusticated coursed and squared rubble masonry, with slate roofs with scalloped bands and ridge cresting. Each chapel has a two light Decorated Gothic style windows beneath a pinnacled gable. Three windows in side walls, the higher central window contained in an advanced coped gable, and canted SE end with Decorated windows and octagonal chimneys.

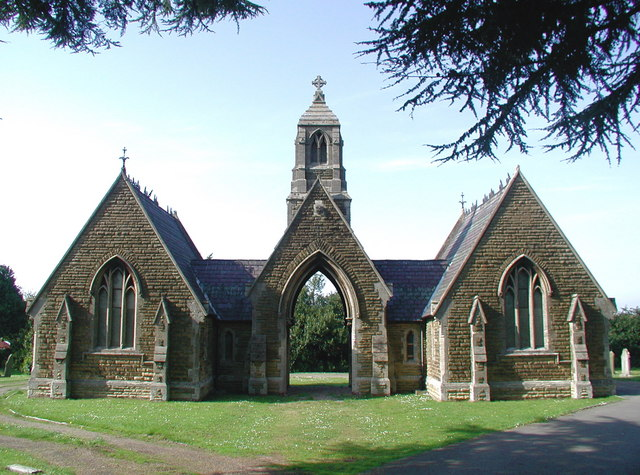
Barton Cemetery 1859

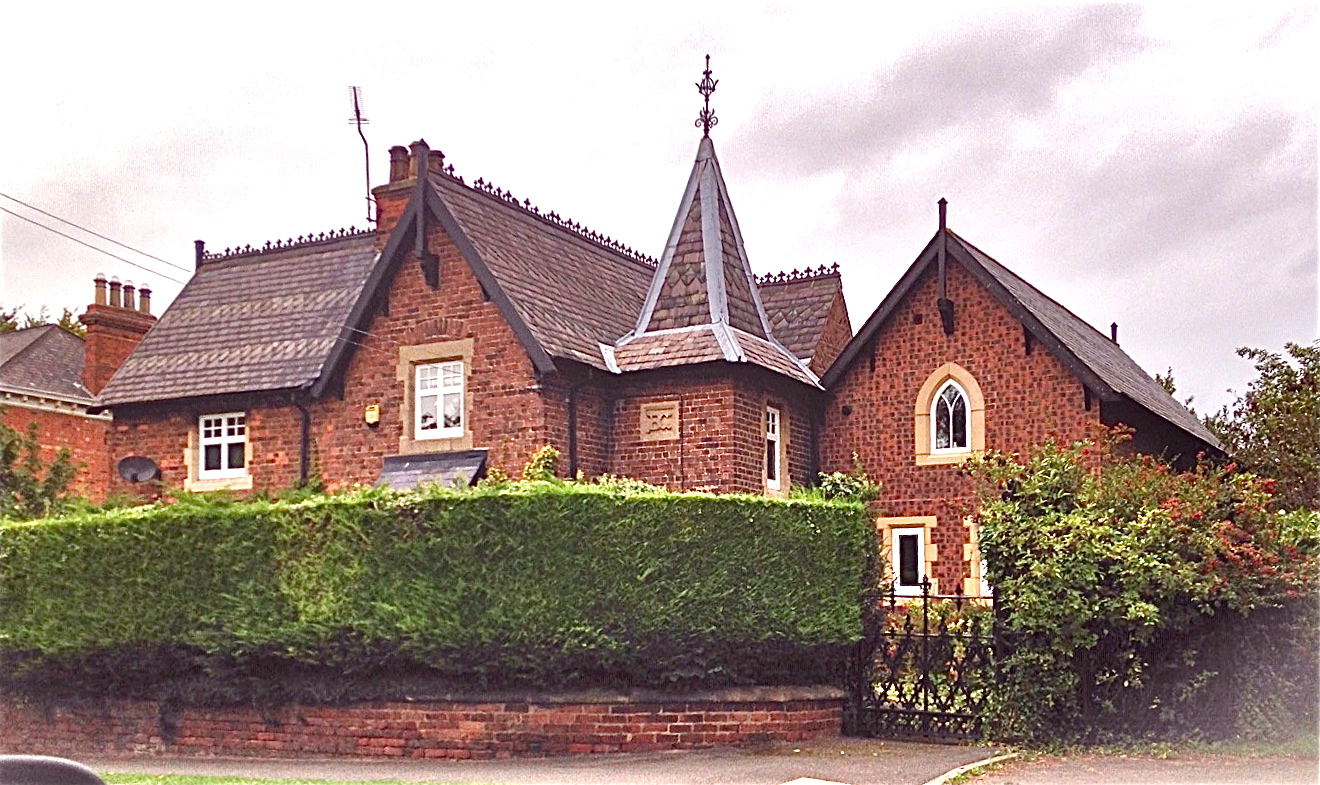
Cemetery Lodge, Barton-upon-Humber

- Barton-upon-Humber, Lincolnshire. (1867) Double chapels for Anglicans and Non-Conformists. The Lodge, which also included a 'registrar's' office faces onto the Barrow road. The lodge is brick with stone dressings and the roof has different coloured banded slates.
- Brumby and Frodingham Cemetery, Cemetery Road, Scunthorpe. (1884). For the Brumby and Frodingham Cemetery Board. Laid out the cemetery with chapel, lodge and entrance gates.

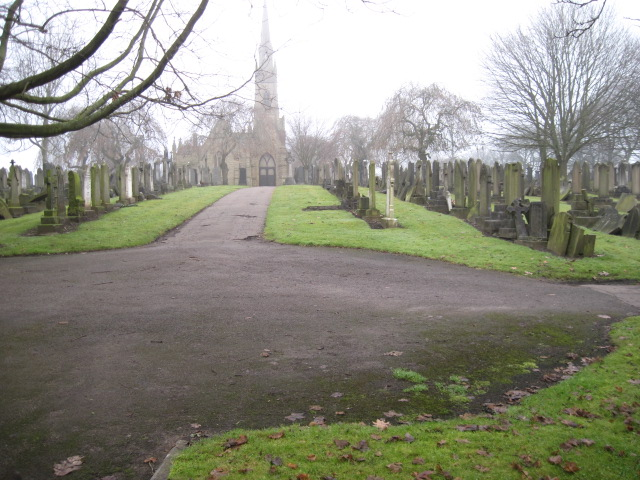
Stretford Cemetery 1885

- Stretford, Manchester. Lime Road 1885. Chapel of Rest. North tower with angle buttresses terminating in with crocheted pinnacles and a slender stone spire. The lower stage is steeply gabled on three sides with opposed tall entrances which create a portes cochère. Short chancel with elaborately pinnacled south porch.

=== Plans for buildings that were not commissioned. ===
- Louth Grammar School and adjacent Bedehouse. Plans for a new Grammar School and Bedehouse were submitted on 14 July 1852 as a part of an affidavit by Pearson Bellamy in the case of the Attorney General versus Lowe. The school had originally been re-established by a charter of 1551 by King Edward VI and there appears to have been a deputed ownership case between the School's Trustees and the Louth Corporation. On 11 December 1852 the Court of Chancery had approved a new scheme for building a new school to accommodate 150 pupils and as soon as funds were available, to re-build the almshouses for 12 poor people. The School was to be built on the Horncastle Road. However, the Bedehouses in Gospelgate and the School, were not built until 1868. The architect was then Fowler of Louth
- Leeds Workhouse. (1858) Bellamy & Hardy submitted plans for the workhouse
- Corn Exchange and Assembly Room, Dundalk, Co. Louth. Their design for the Corn Exchange and Assembly Room in Dundalk, Co. Louth, was selected in a limited competition in 1858, but not built as it could not be erected to the proposed estimate.
- Manchester Assize Courts. Great Ducie St., Manchester (1859) Bellamy and Hardy submitted a design for the Courts together with John Giles. The design was in the Italian style. The competition was won by Alfred Waterhouse.
- Derby Corn Exchange. (1860). Bellamy and Hardy's plans were amongst the four finalists selected for the building of Derby Corn Exchange. The architect chosen was Wilson of Derby.
- Lincoln Mechanics' Institute. Competition for a new building for the Lincoln Mechanics' Institute (1861). Fifty two designs were submitted. Won by Messrs Hooker and Wheeler of Brenchley, Kent. The Institute was never built.
- National Schools at Drypool, Hull. Bellamy and Hardy submitted three designs.
- Harrogate Cemetery. Plans submitted by Bellamy and Hardy. Bellamy and Hardy were the runners-up in the competition.
- Ellesmere Road, United Wesleyan Free Church, Sheffield (1869). Plans submitted by Bellamy and Hardy but were too expensive on that particular site and it was decided to build a chapel on another site.
- Hull Town Hall. Thirty-eight plans were submitted to the competition for building the Town Hall. The winner was R. G. Smitt of Hull and the second prize went to Lockwood and Mawson of Leeds. Bellamy and Hardy are mentioned amongst the competitors.

=== Buildings which were commissioned but have not been identified ===
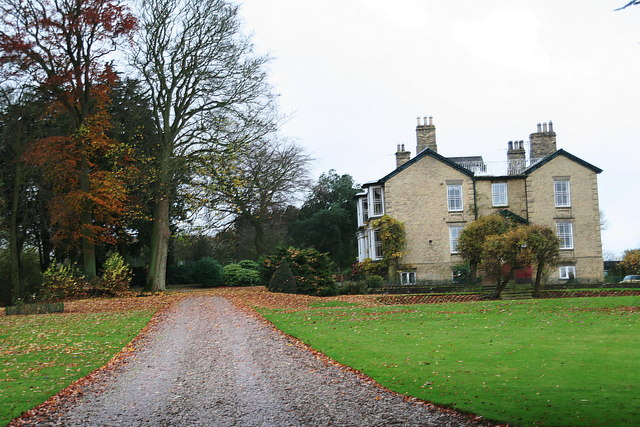
North Ormsby Manor, probably by Bellamy and Hardy

- 19 December 1846 Pearson Bellamy was advertising nationally in the Builder for contractors for the erection of a house "to be built half-way between Louth and Grimsby, may view the drawings and specifications at my office, between the hours of nine o'clock in the morning and six o'clock in the evening.—Sealed Tenders to be delivered as above, on or before the 28th inst." and also "for an experienced clerk of the works for the erection of a church." The house is probably North Ormsby Manor House, which is described as "plain ... Italianate". but the church is yet to be identified.
- Cottingham near Hull. House with outhouses, Probably one of the large villas now occupied by Hull University.

=== Buildings which are likely to have been designed by Pearson Bellamy ===
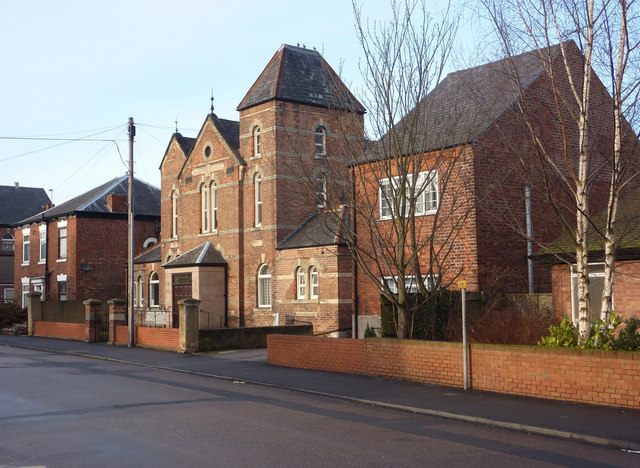
Grove Street, Retford with former Wesleyan school

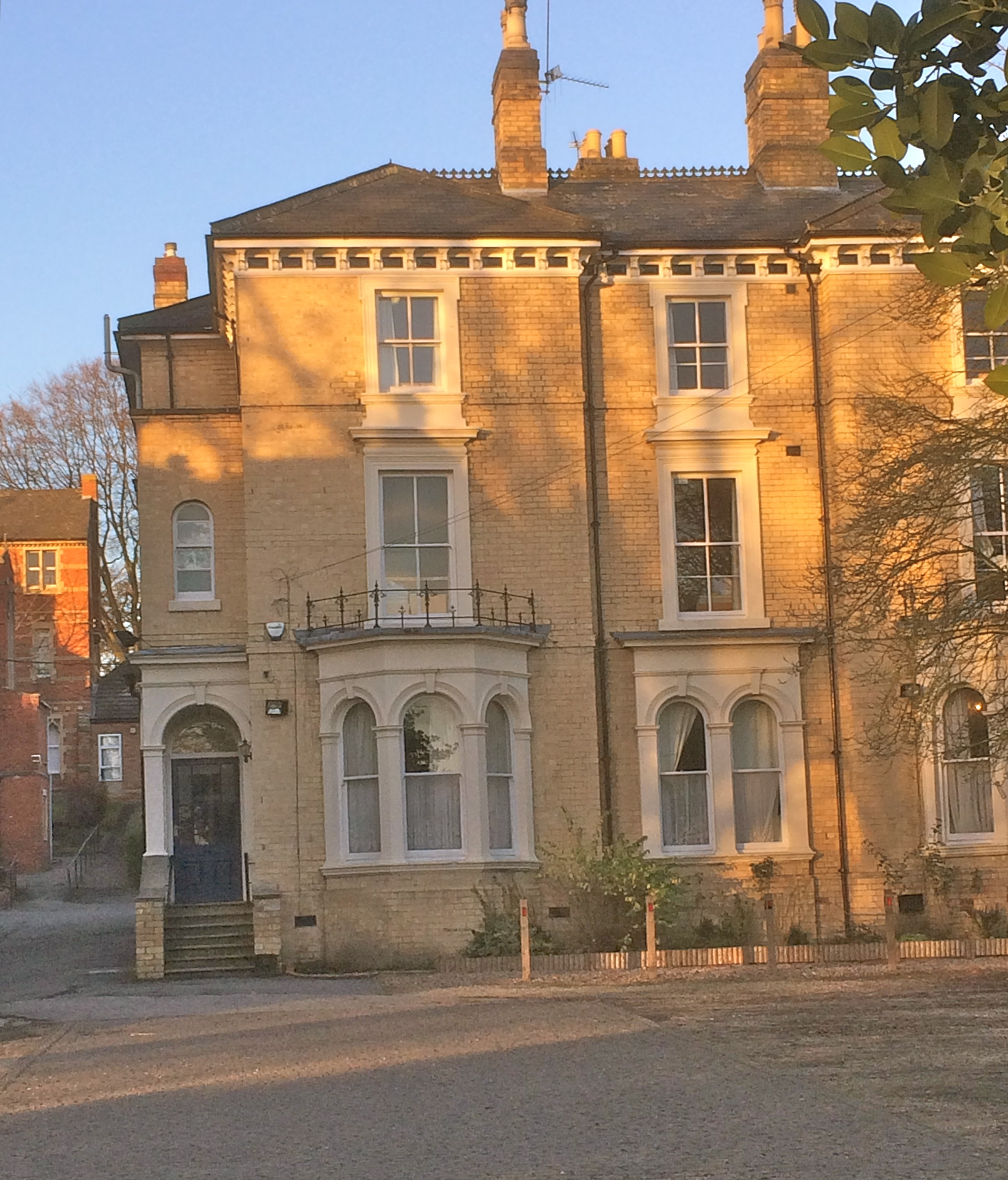
1&2 Lindum Terrace, Lincoln, c.1850

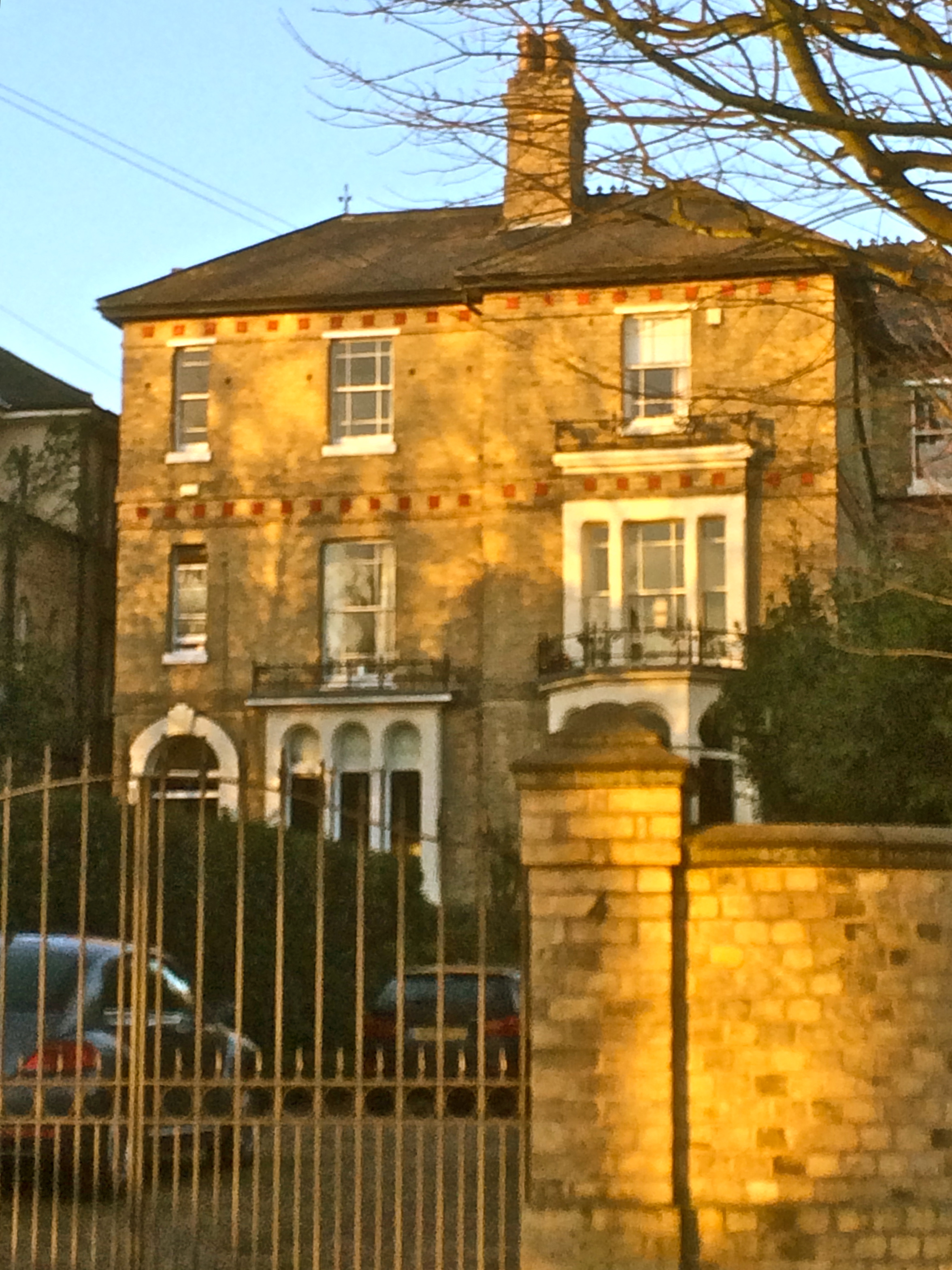
3 &4 Lindum Terrace, Lincoln, c.1850

- Grove Street Wesleyan day school, Retford. The nearby Methodist Chapel was designed by Bellamy and Hardy. As the school building shows characteristic detailing used by these architects, it is also probably their work. The contrasting red and yellow brickwork, with the yellow bricks, used as voussoirs over the windows and continued as stringing between windows is typical. The crested tiles on the ridge of the tower roof is often seen on buildings by Pearson Bellamy. These features can be compared with the Congregational Church and Day school, Gresham Street, Lincoln.

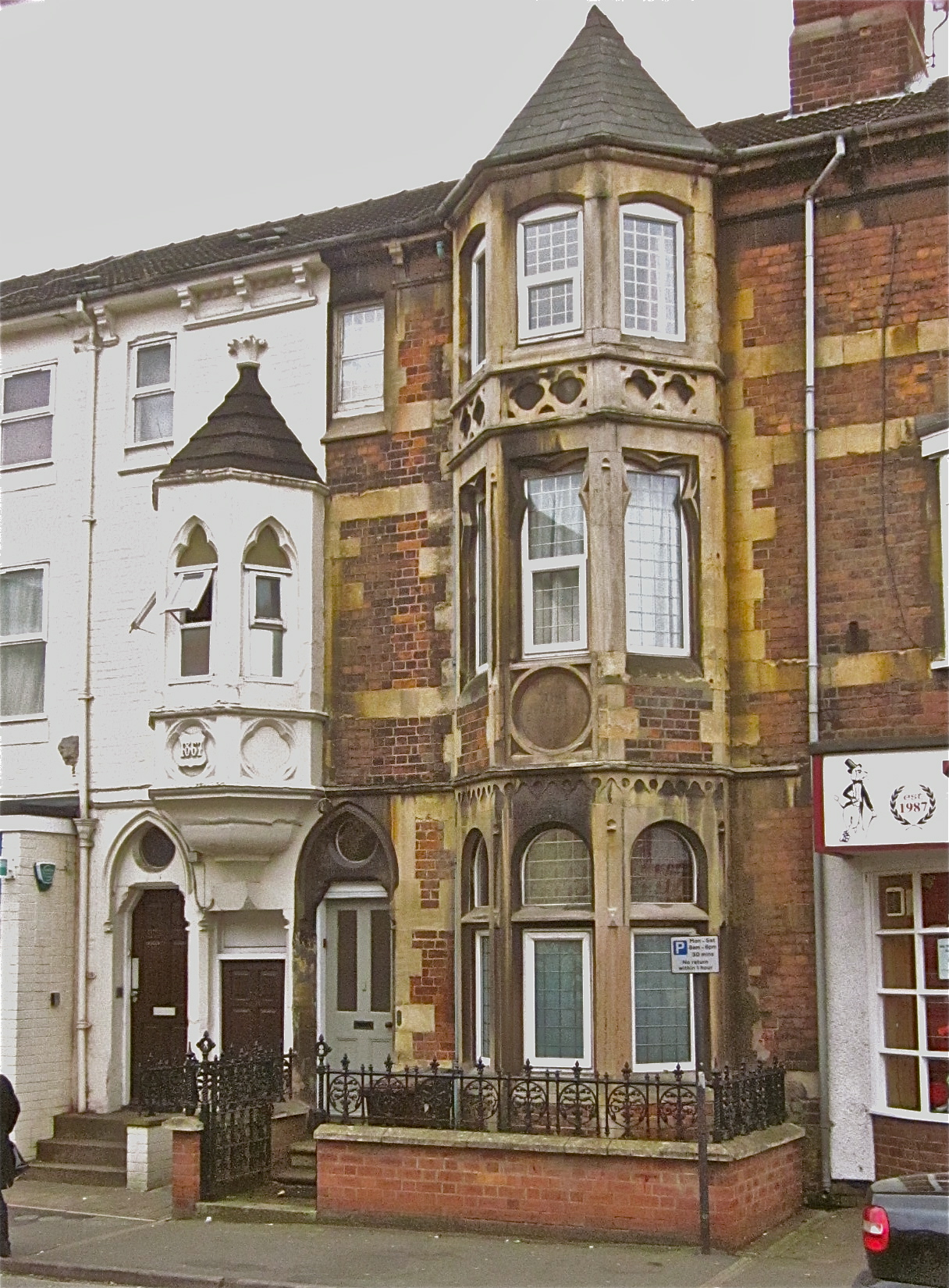
116 &117 Monks Road Lincoln

- 1 & 2 Lindum Terrace and 3 & 4 Lindum Terrace. Two pairs of semi-detached "villa" houses, facing south and immediately adjacent to the old Lincoln Grammar School buildings (now Lincoln Minster School). Yellowish gault bricks. These buildings are clearly by the same architect and have typical characteristics of Pearson Bellamy's work, particularly the roof ridge cresting, use of gault bricks and the cast ironwork. The Grammar School Headmaster's house on Upper Lindum Street also has the decorative raised tiles on the stringing, which is seen on no.4 of this group. Both pairs of these house are listed Grade II.
- 116–125 Monks Road. Lincoln. A group of houses in Ruskinian Gothic, dated 1867. Between Baggeholme and St Hugh's Street. Now much altered. The similarity of these houses with Pearson Bellamy's houses on South Park, makes him a very possible architect for this group.

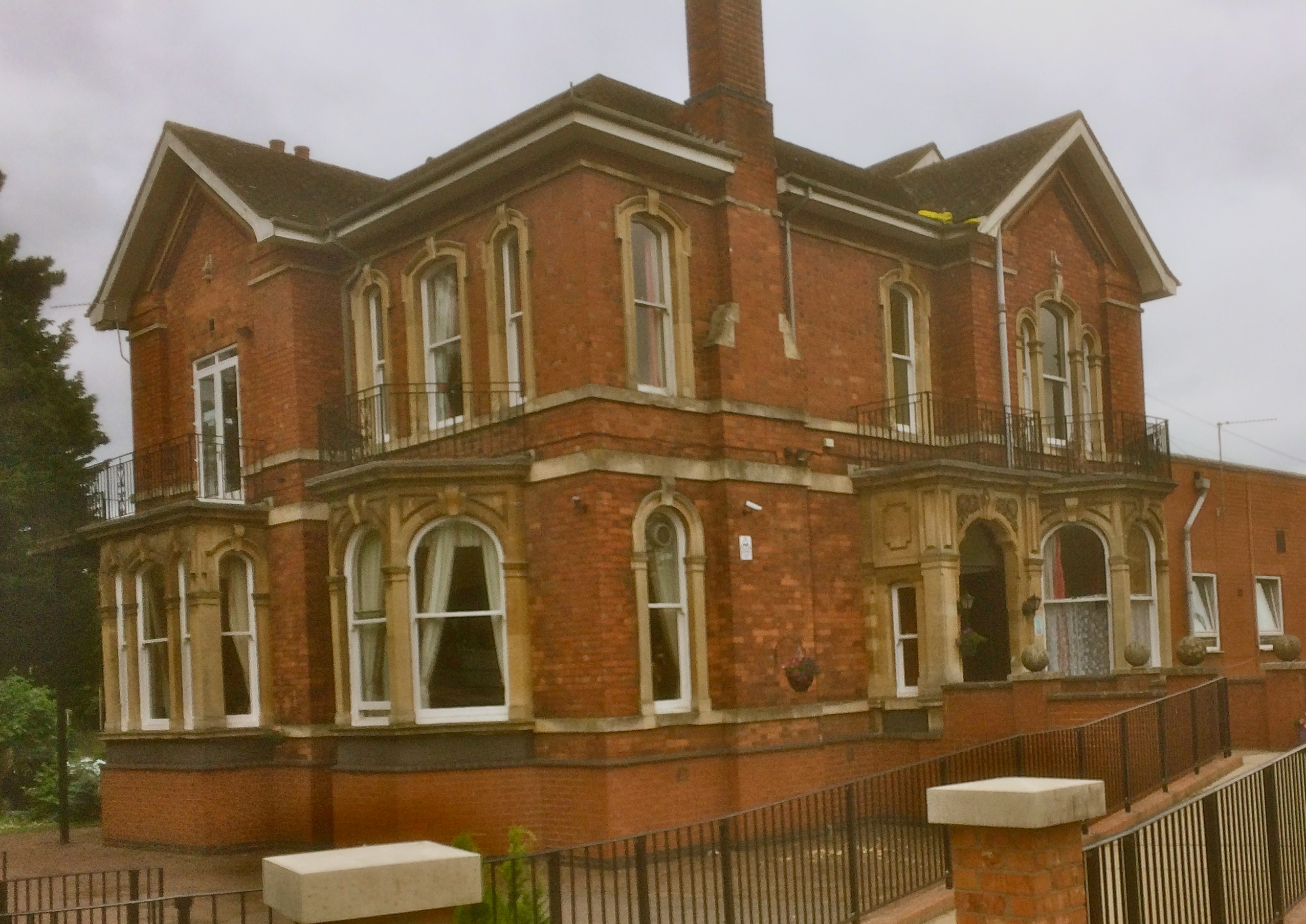
78 South Park, Lincoln c. 1870

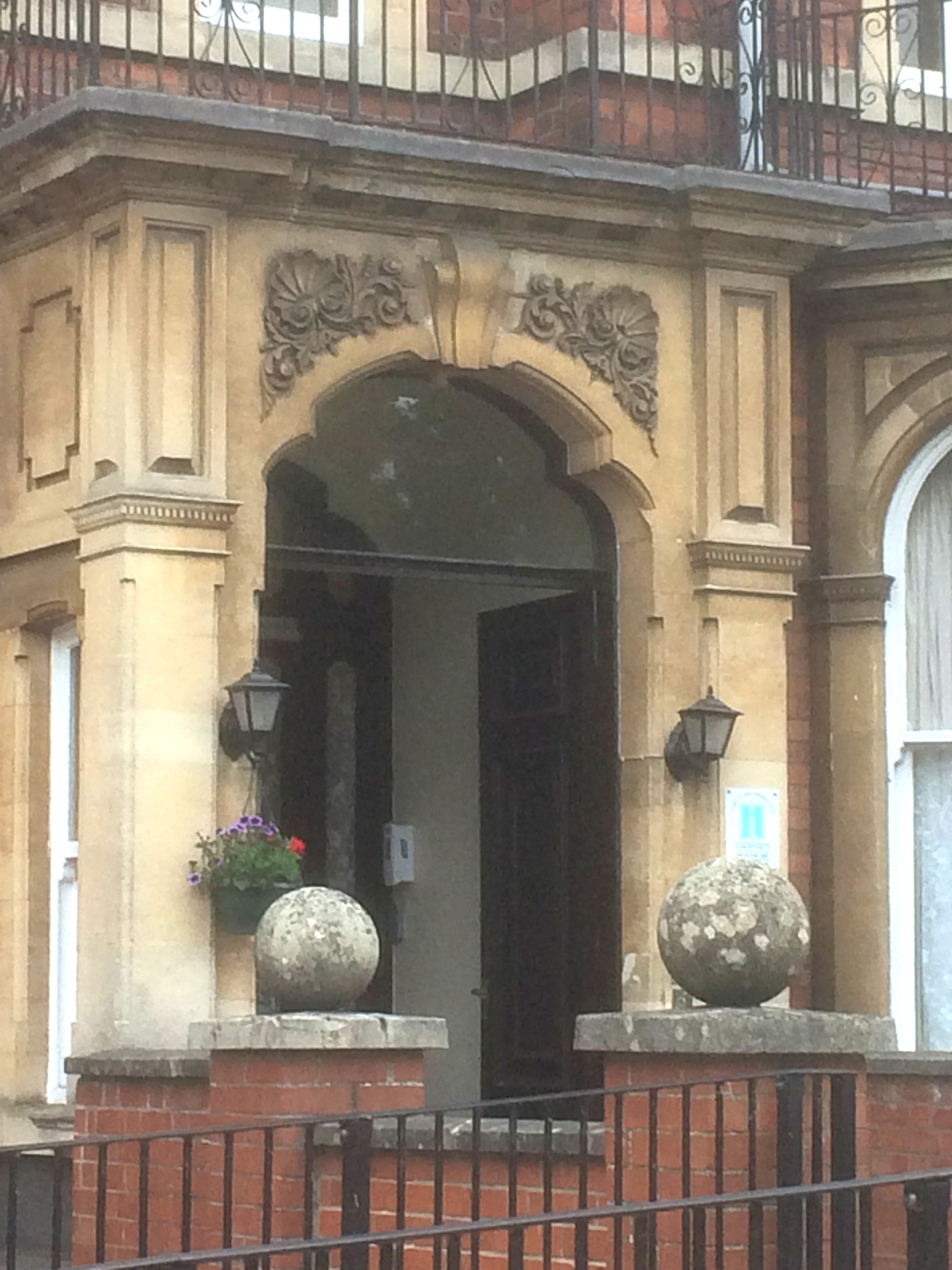
78 South Park. Artificial stone doorway

- 78 South Park (Facing Canwick Road)(c. 1870). (now Canwick Court Care Home). Probably built for Henry Newsum, the Lincoln timber importer and sawmill owner. This house had not been built by 1868, but Pearson Bellamy was adding extensions to the building in 1874. The use of heavy artificial stonework on the building has similarities with the artificial stonework on 16 Lindum Terrace, designed by Bellamy in 1872.
- 1 Sleaford Road, Ruskington. (1867) Very large double villa. Red brick with contrasting whitish brick.
