= John Cooper =

John Cooper may refer to:

== Academics and science ==
- John Thomas Cooper (1790–1854), English chemist
- John Montgomery Cooper (1881–1949), American anthropologist, priest, sociologist
- John Cobb Cooper (1887–1967), American lawyer, administrator, aerospace expert
- John Miller Cooper (1912–2010), American kinesiology researcher, educator
- John A. D. Cooper (1918–2002), American medical education administrator
- John Philip Cooper (1923–2011), professor of agricultural botany
- John Cooper (Islamic studies scholar) (Yahya Cooper) (1947–1998), British Islamic scholar and professor at the University of Cambridge
- John Julius Cooper, 2nd Viscount Norwich (1929–2018), English historian
- John M. Cooper (philosopher) (1939–2022), American philosopher
- John M. Cooper (historian) (born 1940), American historian and educator
- John A. Cooper, American biochemist

== Arts and entertainment ==
- John Cooper (composer) (c. 1570–1626), English classical composer
- John Gilbert Cooper (1722–1769), British poet and miscellaneous writer
- John Cooper (actor) (1793–1870), English actor
- John Paul Cooper (1869–1933), arts and crafts designer in metalwork and jewelry
- John W. Cooper (1873–1966), American ventriloquist and singer
- John Nelson Cooper (1906–1987), custom knife maker
- John Cooper (artist) (1942–2015), English comic illustrator
- John Cooper (author) (born 1958), Canadian writer and communications specialist
- John Cooper (musician) (born 1975), American singer for Skillet
- John Cooper (fl. 1980s–2010s), director of the Sundance Film Festival

== Military ==
- John B. Cooper, US Air Force general
- John B. R. Cooper (1791–1872), California pioneer, sea captain
- John Laver Mather Cooper (1828–1891), U.S. Navy, Medal of Honor recipient
- John Cooper (British Army officer) (born 1955), commander of British forces in Iraq 2008

== Politics ==
- John Cooper (MP for Worcester), in 1380 and 1395 Member of Parliament (MP) for Worcester
- John Cooper (MP for Maldon), in 1421 and 1425 MP for Maldon
- John Cooper (fl. 1529), MP for Berwick-upon-Tweed
- Sir John Cooper, 1st Baronet (died 1630), English landowner and politician
- John Cooper (died 1779), British politician
- John Cooper (New Jersey politician) (1729–1785), public official from New Jersey during the American Revolution
- John Tyler Cooper (1844–1912), American politician
- John G. Cooper (1872–1955), American politician
- John Sherman Cooper (1901–1991), U.S. Senator from Kentucky
- John Cooper (Arkansas politician) (born 1947), member of the Arkansas State Senate since 2014
- John Cooper (Nebraska politician) (1911–1991), member of the Nebraska State Senate
- John Cooper (Tennessee politician) (born 1956), mayor of Nashville
- John Cooper (barrister) (born 1958), British barrister and Queen's Counsel
- John Lewis Cooper, Liberian businessman and government official
- John Cooper (British politician), Scottish MP (elected 2024) and journalist

== Sports ==
- John Cooper (footballer, born 1897) (1897–1975), English footballer
- John Cooper (Scottish footballer) (fl. 1930s), Scottish footballer
- John Cooper (car maker) (1923–2000), British racing driver & entrepreneur
- John Cooper (cricketer, born 1855) (1855–1928), English cricketer and solicitor
- John Cooper (cricketer, born 1922) (1922–2012), Australian cricketer
- John Cooper (Australian footballer) (1933–2020), Australian footballer
- John Cooper (American football) (born 1937), coach
- John Cooper (motorcyclist) (born 1938), British Grand Prix motorcycle racer
- John Cooper (hurdler) (1940–1974), British athlete
- John Cooper (tennis) (born 1946), Australian tennis player
- John Grantley Cooper (born 1954), Welsh chess master
- John Cooper (basketball) (born 1969), head men's basketball coach at Miami University
- John Cooper (rugby union), English international rugby union player

== Other people ==
- John Cooper (archdeacon of Westmorland) (died 1896)
- John Cooper (archdeacon of Aston) (born 1933), British Anglican priest
- John Cooper (journalist), Scottish journalist and Conservative parliamentary candidate
- John Cooper (serial killer) (born 1944), serial killer from Milford Haven, Pembrokeshire
- John Henry Cooper (c. 1855–1910), English architect
- John M. Cooper (architect) (c. 1883–1950), American architect

== Fictional ==
- John Cooper (Southland), a character on Southland
- John Cooper, a character in Desperados: Wanted Dead or Alive

== See also ==
- Jack Cooper (disambiguation)
- Johnny Cooper (disambiguation)
- John Cooper Clarke, English performance poet
- Jon Cooper, ice hockey coach
- Jonathan Cooper (disambiguation)
