= Henry Goddard (architect) =

English architect (1813–1899)

Goddard, Henry
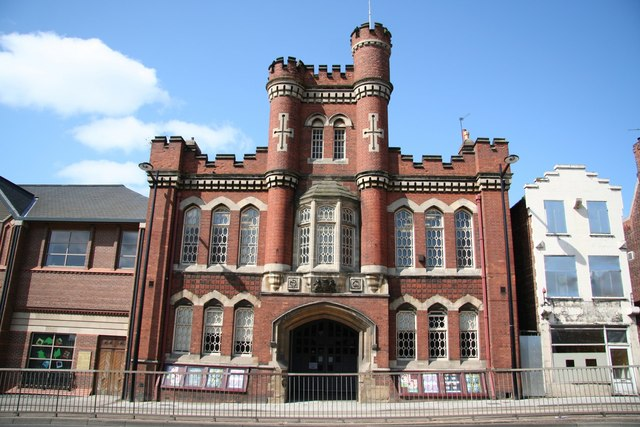
- The Drill Hall, Broadgate, Lincoln 1890
- Born: 1813; Leicester
- Died: 8 March 1899 (aged 85–86); John of Gaunt's House, Lincoln
- Occupation: Architect
- Practice: Partner with W A Nicholson.

Henry Goddard (1813 – 1899) was an English architect who was a member of a family of architects who worked in Leicester. He moved to Lincoln and was later in partnership with his son Francis Henry Goddard.

== Career ==
In 1838 he came to Lincoln and formed a partnership with William Adams Nicholson. In 1846 he established his own practice in Lincoln and in 1849 he was awarded a prize by the Agricultural Society for his essay on the Construction of Labourer's Cottages In 1856 was working from 181 High Street. He became architect to the Great Northern Railway Company and surveyor to Trinity College, Cambridge. Goddard also had an office in Boston in 1859. From 1860 to 1864 his senior assistant was William Watkins, who was to set up his own architectural practice in Lincoln. In 1871 the Nottingham architect Albert Nelson Bromley was working in Goddard's office. Goddard was in partnership with his son, sometime after 1872. Their practice was at City Chambers in Gibbeson House, 182 Lincoln High Street, Goddard was already working there before 1856, and where the practice remained until at least 1896. The Lincoln architect John Henry Cooper worked the Goddards' offices and set up his own practice in Lincoln after about 1888. Henry Goddard lived at John of Gaunt's House, 116 High Street where he died on 8 March 1899. The net value of his estate was £10,378.

=== Family ===
Goddard was the son of Cornelius Goddard of Leicester and nephew of Henry Goddard (architect 1792–1868) and cousin of Joseph Goddard (architect 1840–1900), both of whom worked in Leicester. He married Eleanor Ann, the fourth daughter of Mr George Baker of Nottingham at St Mary's Church Nottingham in December 1838. Henry Goddard's son Francis Henry appears to have retired from the practice at about the time of his father's death. He lived at Eastfield, Lincoln. He died from a heart attack on 26 June 1907 after motoring back from Retford.

Care should be taken not to confuse the work of Henry Goddard and Goddard and Co. of Leicester with that of Henry Goddard and Goddard and Son of Lincoln. For work of the Leicester architects see The Goddard Trail The Leicester branch of the Goddard practice survives to-day as Goddard Manton Architects, operating from Camden Town in London.

== Works ==
Initially Goddard appears to have specialised in Church building and Rectories and Vicarages and was a surveyor for the Diocese of Lincoln. He probably followed Edward James Willson as the surveyor to the Lincolnshire County Committee and, following the Militia Act 1852, was commissioned in 1857 to build the Old Barracks in Lincoln for the North Lincoln Militia. It has also been suggested that he may have been responsible for the Old Barracks in Sandon Road in Grantham for the South Lincolnshire Militia.

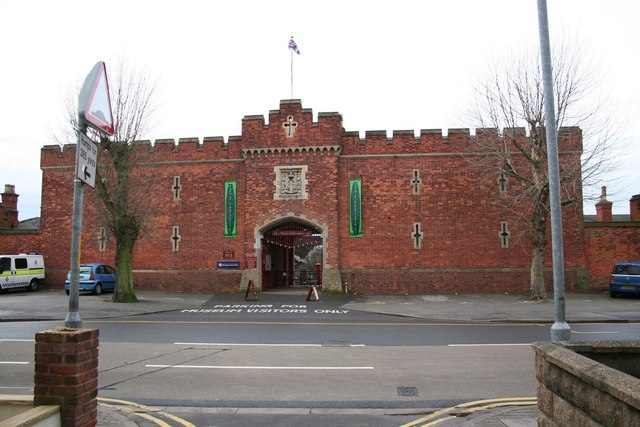
The Old Barracks in Lincoln built for the North Lincoln Militia, 1857.

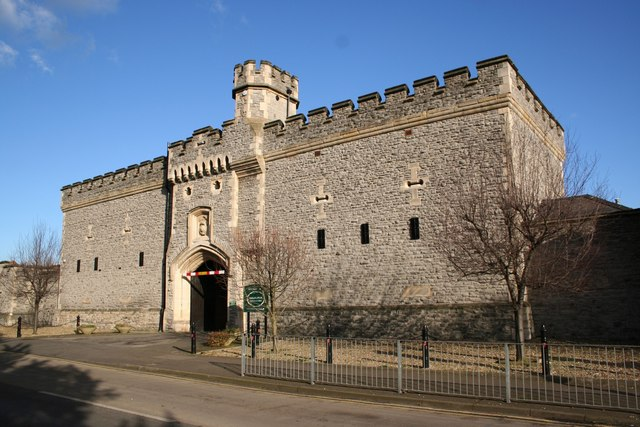
Grantham Barracks possibly by Henry Goddard, 1858.

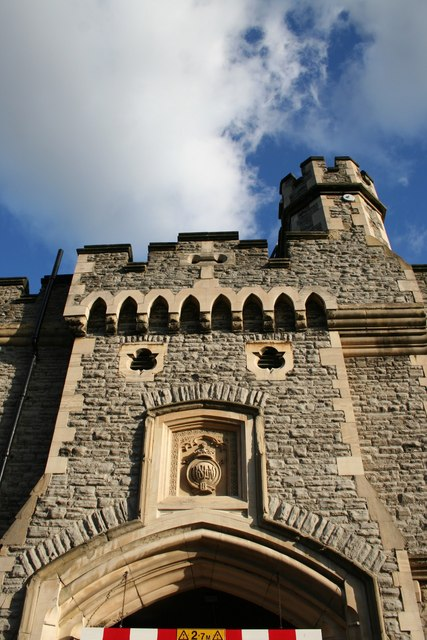
Grantham Barracks detail

=== Work for the Great Northern Railway ===
By 1848 Henry Goddard was appointed architect to the Great Northern Railway. This was after King's Cross had been built by Lewis Cubitt and branch lines from Lincoln to Boston, Gainsborough, Peterborough and Grimsby had been completed. He was responsible for all the new main line stations between King's Cross and Doncaster. The new main line ran through Peterborough, Newark and Retford and was fully operational by 1852. He was also the architect for Boston railway station which opened 1850. Many of Goddard's stations on the branch lines had tall towers, often placed centrally, as at Spalding. Apart from the railway stations, Goddard was also the architect for the Great Northern Hotels at Peterborough and at Lincoln.

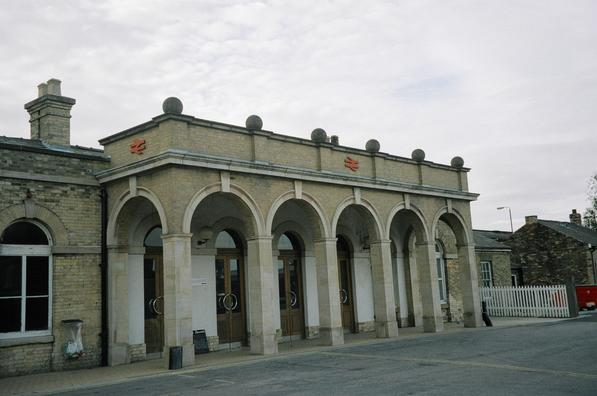
Boston Railway Station, 1850

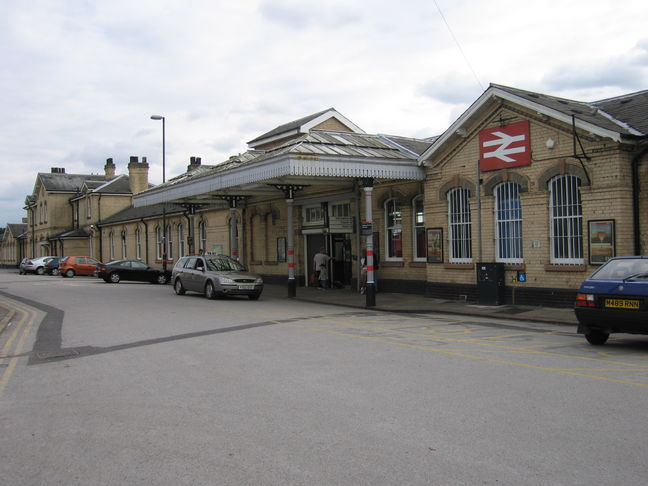
Retford Rilaway Station

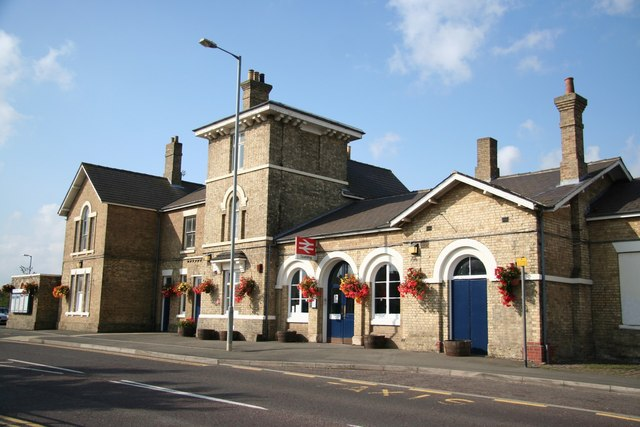
Spalding Station1848

=== Architect to the Lincolnshire Constabulary ===
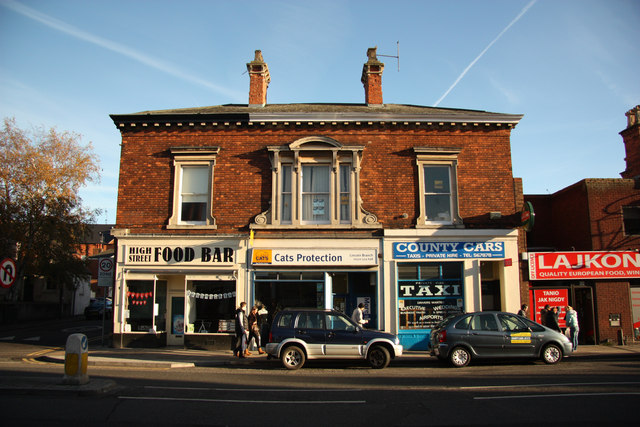
Lincolnshire County Police HQ 382 High Street,1859

The Lincolnshire Constabulary was formed in 1856 under the County and Borough Police Act 1856. Goddard was the first architect to the Constabulary and the first buildings to be constructed were in the south of the County at Spalding, Holbeach and Long Sutton in 1857. with further Police Stations at Donington in 1858, Sutterton in 1859 and Crowland in 1865. The new County Headquarters building of 1859, by Goddard, was at 382 High Street, Lincoln. This is now divided into three shops. It was built in brick with stone dressing and a central Venetian window with a central curved pediment, supported by ornamental consoles.

=== Public and Commercial Buildings ===
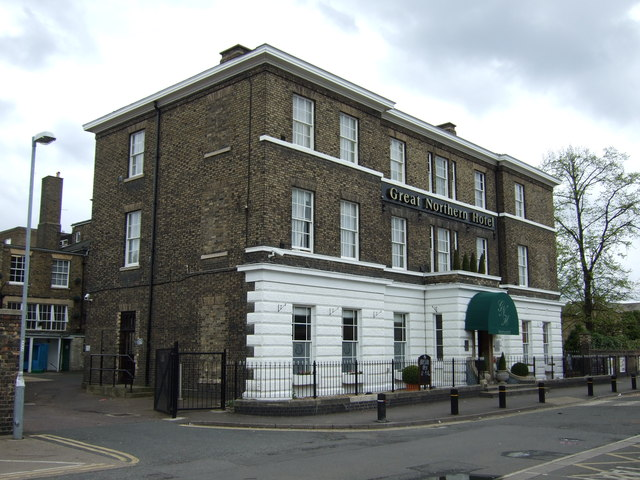
The Great Northern Hotel, Station Road, Peterborough

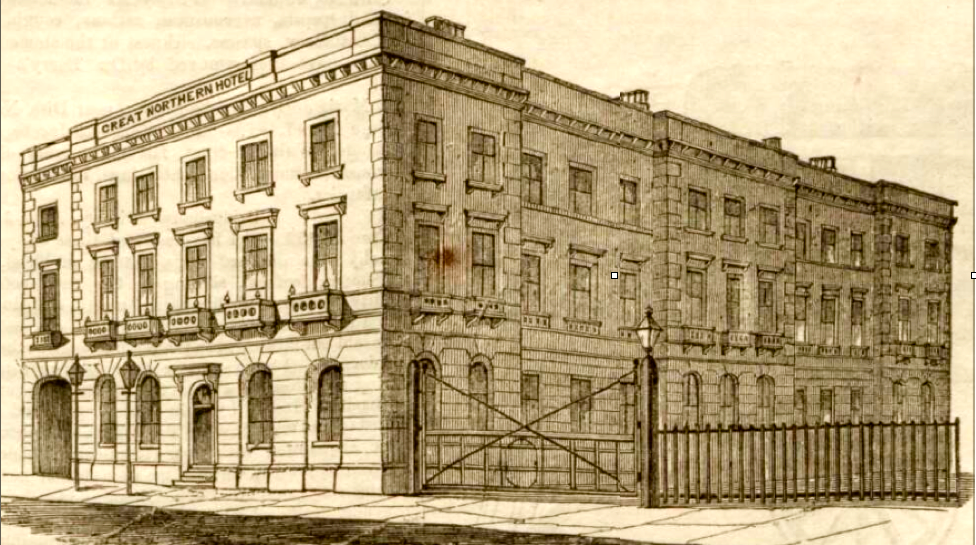
Great Northern Hotel, Lincoln

- Great Northern Hotel, Peterborough.
- Great Northern Hotel and Great Northern Vaults, 177 High Street (west side), Lincoln 1847 but formerly ‘’ The Black Boy’’. By Henry Goddard. Behind, facing the railway was a 13 bay range Pevsner claimed that it was possibly incorporating parts of an earlier building, but record photographs of the demolition show this was not the case. Demolished c.1959.
- Great Northern Vaults, High Street, Lincoln. On the opposite side of the street to the Great Northern Hotel, also by Goddard. This was presumably a wine and spirits storage deport with an Italianate tower with a large entrance arch and two wings facing onto the High Street, just too the south of the existing railway crossing. All demolished apart from a portion of the southern wing which still fronts onto the High Street

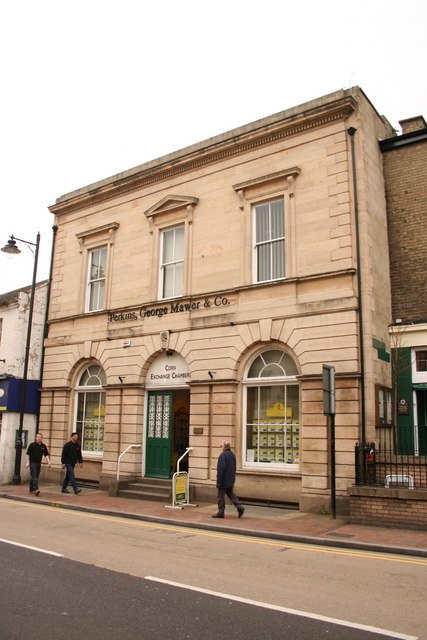
Market Rasen Corn Exchange of 1854

- The Corn Exchange, Market Rasen, Lincolnshire, 1854. Stone faced Italianate facade.

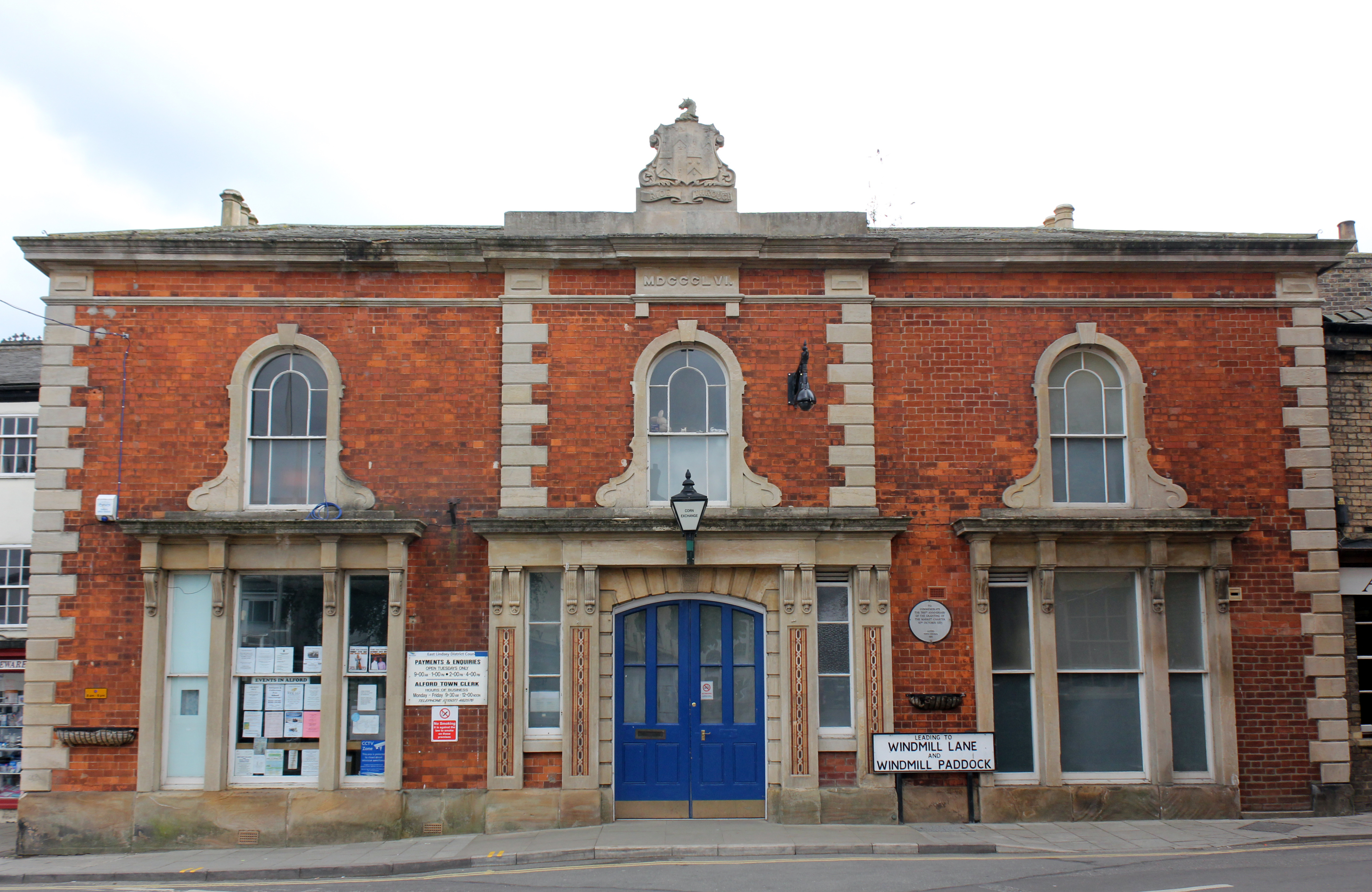
Alford Corn Exchange, 1856

- The Corn Exchange, Alford, Lincolnshire, 1856. Italianate Venetian derived style
- The Old Barracks in Lincoln (now occupied by the Lincolnshire Life Museum), 1857.
- Former Post Office 12-13 Guildhall Street, Lincoln.(1860) This was the Lincoln Post office until 1906 when a new Post Office was built on the opposite side of the street. Two buildings, one three storey and the other two storeys, red brick with black and yellow polychrome brickwork decoration. The upper floors of No 12 were for the Post Master's accommodation. No 13 is now part of the William Foster Public House.
- The Mechanic's Institute, Carlton le Willows, Gedling, Nottinghamshire. Memorial Hall for the late Earl of Chesterfield. The foundation stone of Institute was laid by his brother-in-law, the Earl of Carnavon on 16 September 1872, and the architects were Goddard and Son, Lincoln.

=== Houses ===
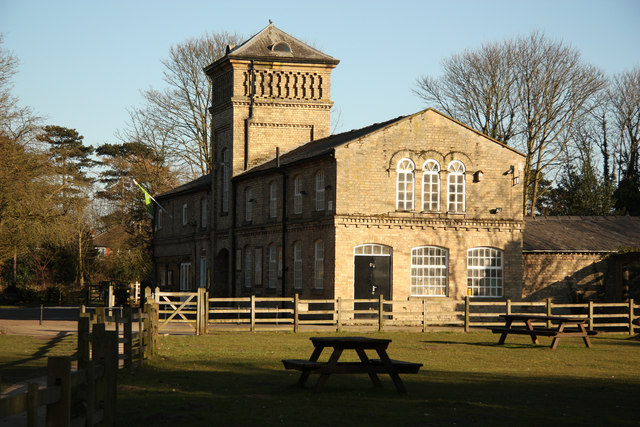
Hartsholme Hall Stable block

- Lincoln Hartshome Hall, was built in 1862 for the industrialist Joseph Shuttleworth. The grounds were laid out by the landscape architect Edward Milner and included a lake, imported and native trees and shrubs, yew trees forming the Ladies’ Walk, a yew circle, a small crescent-shaped pond and a ha-ha. Surviving buildings and structures include the boathouse (built in 1881 and bearing the Shuttleworth Crescent), stables, a lodge along the track leading to Doddington Road, balustrades and steps, and a number of monuments including the obelisk on the north side of the lake. Hartsholme Hall itself was demolished in 1951 after being purchased by Lincoln City.
- Monks' Manor, Lincoln. Goddard would appear to have designed this house for Joseph Ruston in the 1860s and added a picture gallery in 1883. The house stood in approximately 25 acres between Greetwell Road and Wragby Road. It was in an Italianate style with a tower. The house demolished in 1933.
- Somerby Rectory, Lincolnshire. (1865)
- Owston Ferry, Lincolnshire. Old Vicarage, 1866.
- Sturton by Stow. Additions to the Rectory. 1866
- Scawby. Alterations to Old Vicarage, 1868.

=== School ===
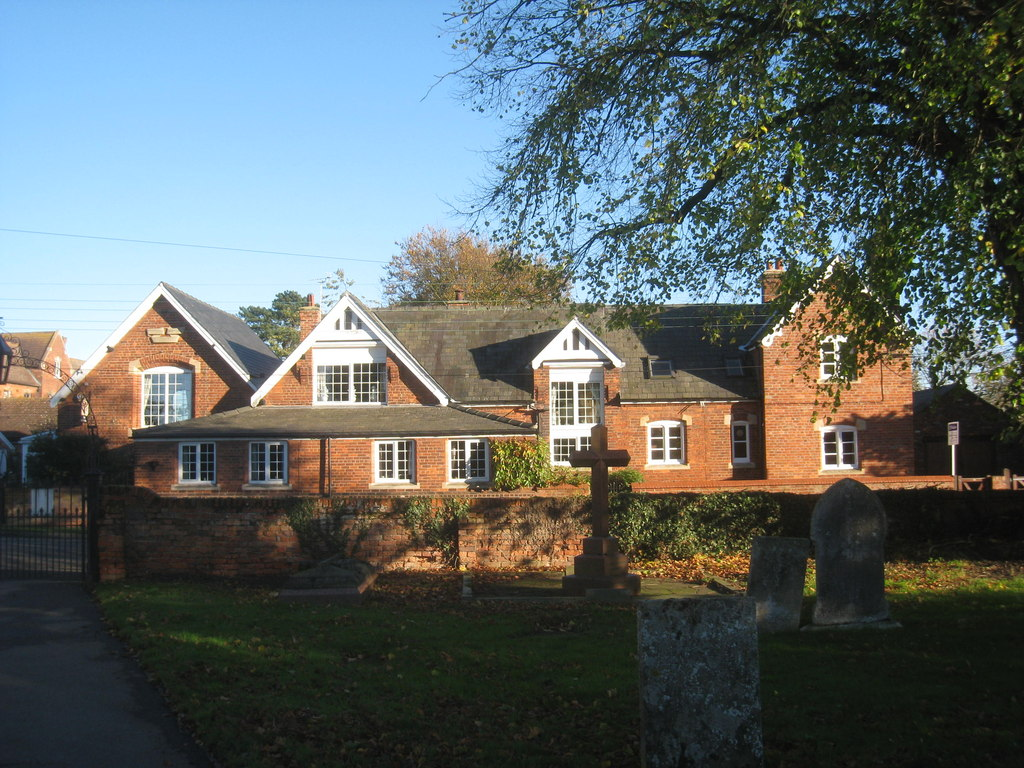
The Old School, Bassingham 1855

- National School, Bassingham, Lincolnshire. Later Board School and now primary school.(1855) The Lincolnshire Chronicle reports:The National schools here have just been completed from the design, and under the direction of Mr. H. Goddard, architect, of Lincoln. The buildings are conveniently situated opposite to the church, and their plan resemble the letter H, one wing forming the boys' school, and the other the master's residence, with the girls' school in the centre, the offices being detached and in the rear. The walls are of red brick-work, with arched and splayed openings for the window frames, and the gables of the roof, which are of a high pitch and covered with slate, are ornamented with carved verge boards, that of the boys' school having also stone ribbon, bearing the name and date of erection. The cost of construction was about £650.

=== Church Restoration ===
- Saxilby. Former St Andrew's church, 1879
- Hemswell church. Rebuilt 1857–65.
- St Botolph's Church, Saxilby. Rebuilt nave in 1861.

=== Cemetery ===
- Lincoln Cemetery, Canwick road. Laid out by Goddard 1856.

== H and F H Goddard ==
In partnership after 1867.

=== Work by the Goddards for the Lincoln Industrialists ===
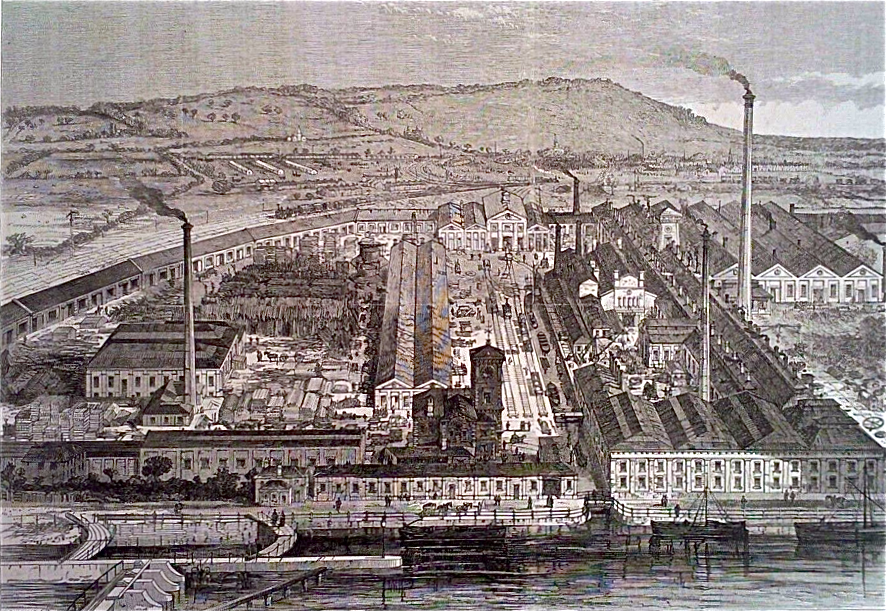
Clayton and Shuttleworth, Lincoln

The rapid growth of Lincoln in the mid to late 19th century provided considerable opportunities for undertaking architectural work for wealthy factory owners who were involved in the engineering and metalworking industries. This work involved the design and layout of factories, the provision of housing, the laying out of new streets and the construction of the villas and residences of the factory owners. The Goddards seem to have developed a close relationship with Joseph Ruston who was the managing director of Ruston, Proctor and Company. The Goddards were are likely to be the architects of his house, Monk's Manor on Greetwell Road in Lincoln. They also provided new offices for Ruston Proctor on their Stamp End Sheaf Works Joseph Ruston also financed the building of the Drill Hall in Broadgate for which Goddards were the architects. The Goddards also undertook extensive design work for Clayton & Shuttleworth who occupied the adjacent site to Ruston Proctor at Stamp End. A print of 1865 of their ironworks would suggest that they had been closely involved in the layout of the factory. An Italianate tower in the central foreground appears to be a hallmark of their work and is seen again on the Great Northern Hotel depot building and on Ruston's Monk's Manor. They were to add further offices to this complex in 1878. The Goddards also designed Hartsholme Park for Joseph Shuttleworth. Another factory complex that was laid out by the Goddards was the new Wellington Foundry on the Derby Farm in New Boultham in 1883.

=== Public Buildings ===
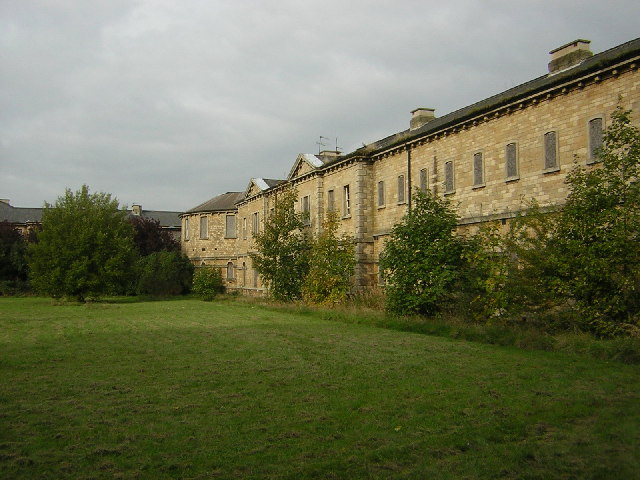
St.John's Hospital- wing possibly by Goddard

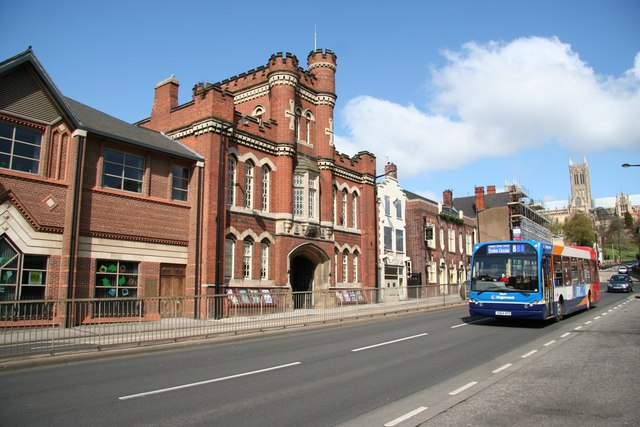
The Drill Hall, Broadgate by F.H. Goddard

- Lincoln, The Drill Hall, Broadgate. 1890. The architect was Major F. H. Goddard of Goddard and Co. It was built at the cost of £10,000 which was funded by Joseph Ruston. It was created as a result of the 1863 Volunteer Act and was to provide drilling facilities for the 1st Lincolnshire Volunteer Battalion.
- St John's Hospital, London Road, Bracebridge Lincolnshire. County Asylum, now converted into housing. Built between 1849 and 1852. Addition in 1880-82 of two wings to the original building by F.H. Goddard of Lincoln-the builder was W. Pattison.. This brought the capacity of the hospital to 680. Goddard was also the architect for further additions built in 1897.

=== Bank ===
- Barclay's Bank, High Street. Lincoln. 1873. Stone of three storeys with a parapet and ornate cornicing. The ground floor with a Romanesque Revival doorway and two windows in Romanesque style. On the corner of High Street with Cornhill. Demolished in 1973 or earlier and replaced with present building by Bright of Clarke Hall, Scorer and Bright

=== Schools ===
- St Martins Parochial School, Hungate/Motherby Lane, Lincoln.(1867).
- St Swithin's School, Croft Street, Lincoln.
- Brigg Grammar School extension 1878.
- St Martin's Parochial Boys School, Beaumont Fee, Lincoln.(1895/6). The facade of this school is now incorporated into the Iconic building.

=== Rectories and Vicarages ===
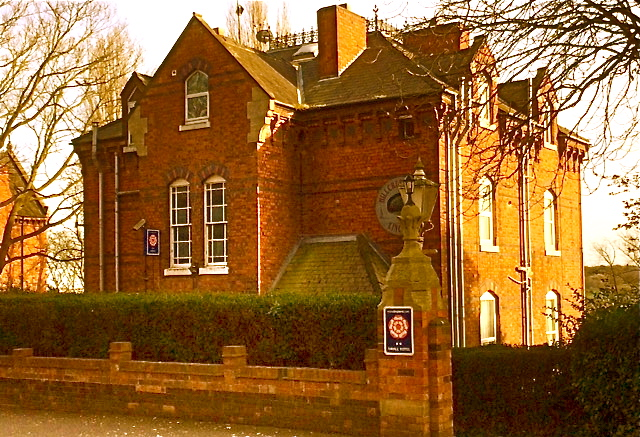
Hillcrest Hotel, Lindum Terrace, Lincoln

- St Swithins Parsonage 15 Lindum Terrace, Lincoln. 1871. Red brick with black banding running round the building at second storey level and contrasting red and black bricks used for window voussoirs. Iron cresting to roof ridges. Now the Hillcrest Hotel.

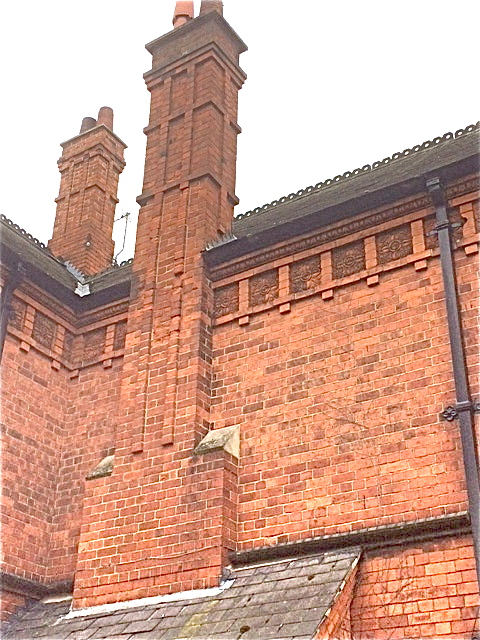
St Peter at Gowts Vicarage. Chimneys and terracotta detailing

- Bourne Vicarage. By F.H Goddard, 1878.
- Spridlington Hall (former Rectory). Additions 1878.
- 17 Minster Yard, (Subdeanery) Extensive rebuilding and re-fenestration to the east end for Rev. Clements by F.H. Goddard

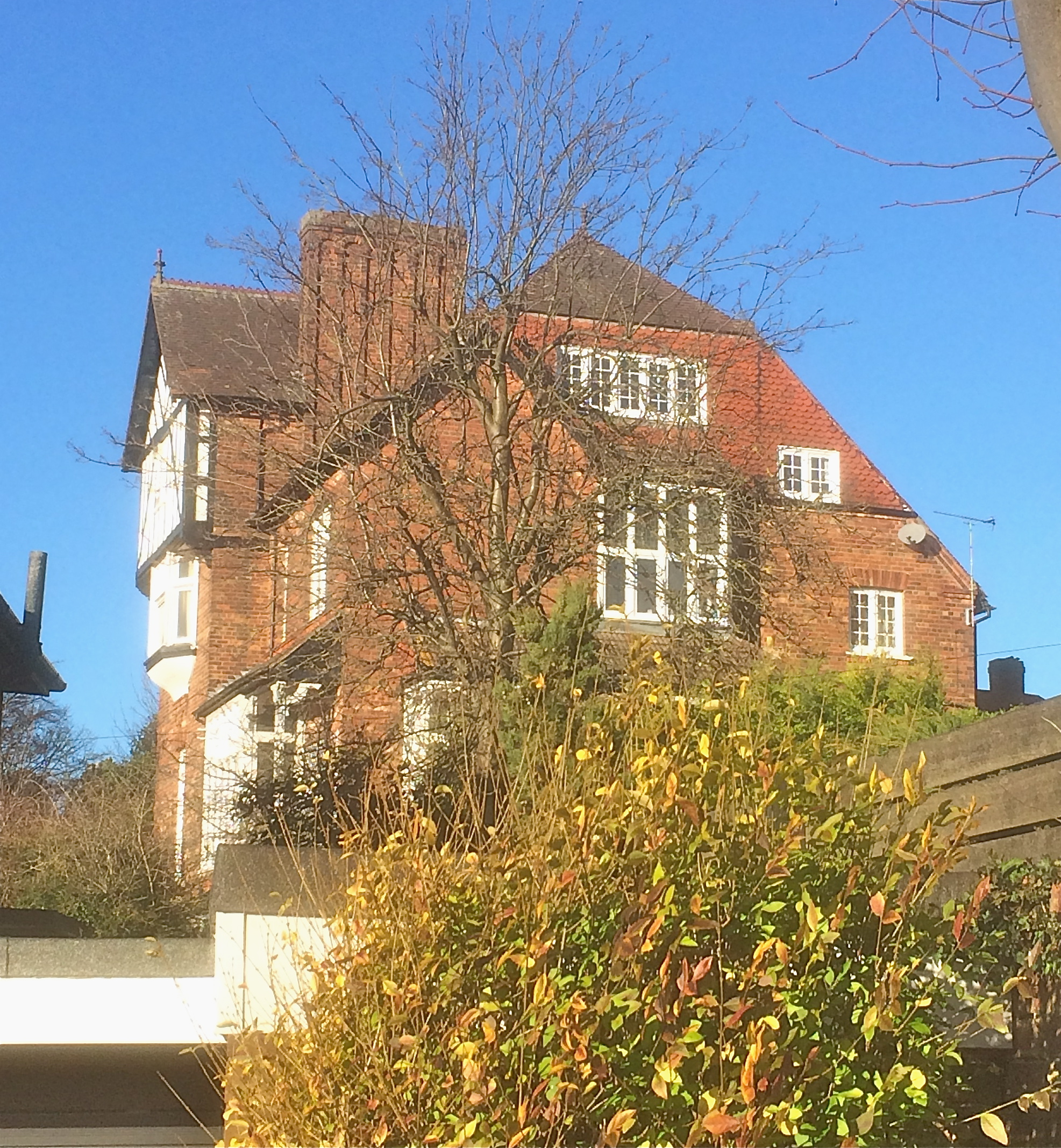
St Michaels Vicarage, Drury Lane Lincoln 1882

- St Michael's Vicarage, Gibraltar Hill, Drury Lane, Lincoln.1882. Prominently sited overlooking Lincoln from just below the Castle. Arts and Crafts style with tile hanging and upper part of projecting gable half timbered. Brick arcaded chimney stack. Built for the Rev. G. B. Jamieson

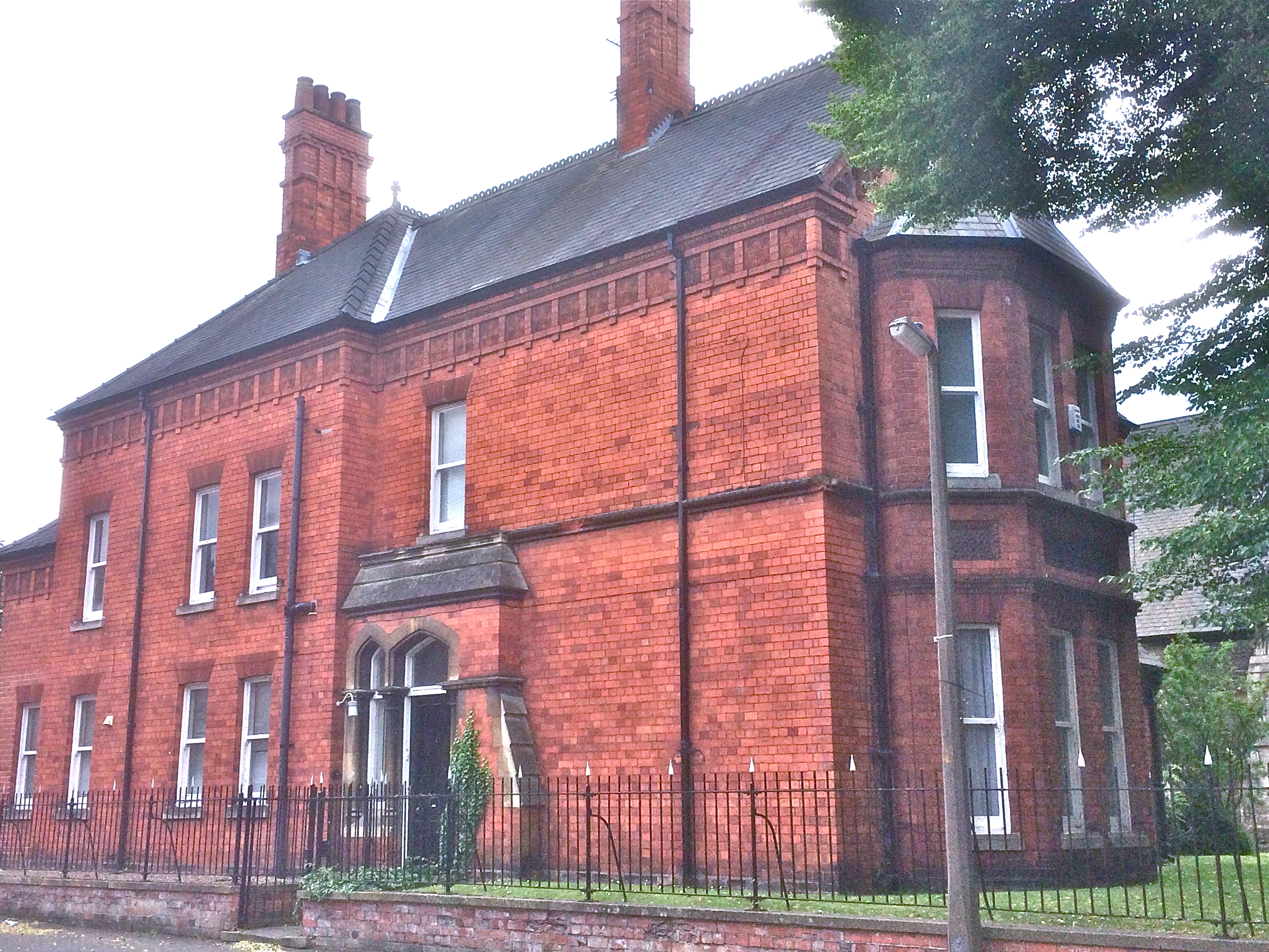
St Peter at Gowts vicarage, Lincoln

- St Peter at Gowts Vicarage (1897-9). 1 Sibthorp Street, Lincoln. By Goddard and Son. Red brick with bay window facing High Street. Elaborate moulded terracotta frieze running below the eaves and on the bay window. Terracotta probably by Fambrini & Daniels.

=== Houses ===
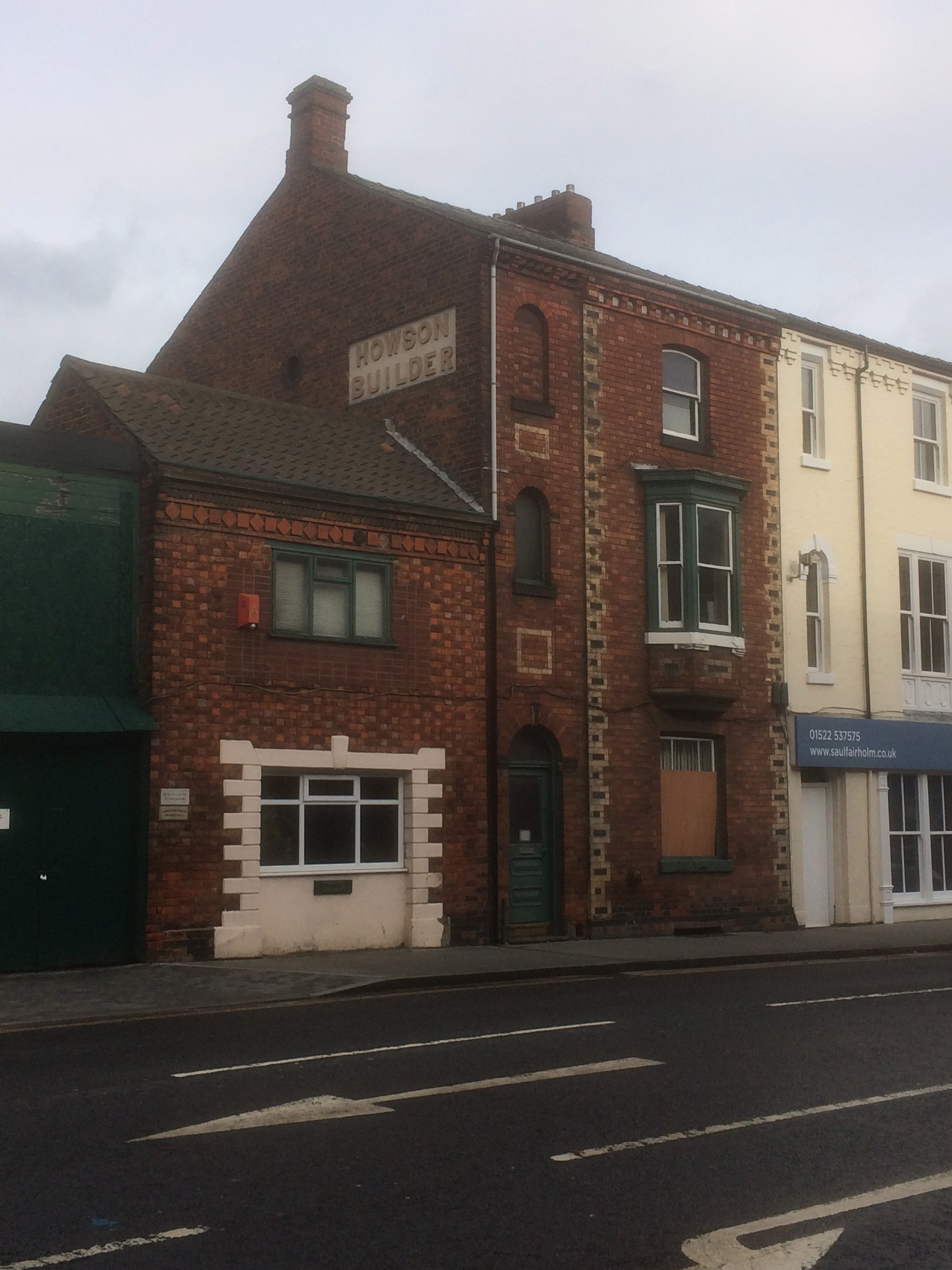
Tentercroft Street, Lincoln

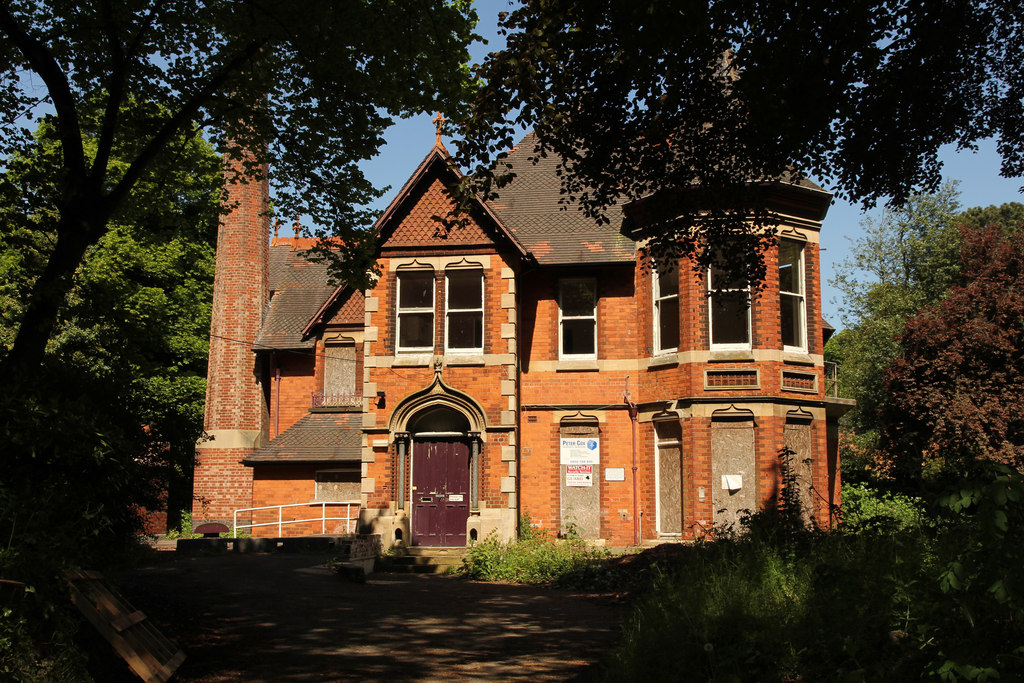
12 Lindum Terrace 1886

- 10-12 Tentercroft Street. Two Houses for Mr Axtel. (1869).
- 14 Lindum Terrace, Lincoln, 1871.
- 13-15 South Park, Lincoln.
- Wootton Lodge Northgate, Lincoln.
- 12 Lindum Terrace 1886. Demolished August 2022.
- Sycamore and Orchard House. Beaumont Fee, Lincoln.(1887) Double villa house, each with an advanced rectangular bays, set at right angles to Beaumont Fee to give view over Lincoln. Built for George Glazier, a member of the City Council. Tall chimney stack and ornamental datestone 1887. Queen Anne Style with unusual decorative slate hanging to the bays.
- 6 The Avenue, Lincoln. 1893.Brick, but now painted cream. Two storeyed, with central porch and ornamented Dutch gable above and flanked with pedimented gables and canted bays to either side of porch. Now part of the Ridgeway Care Centre.

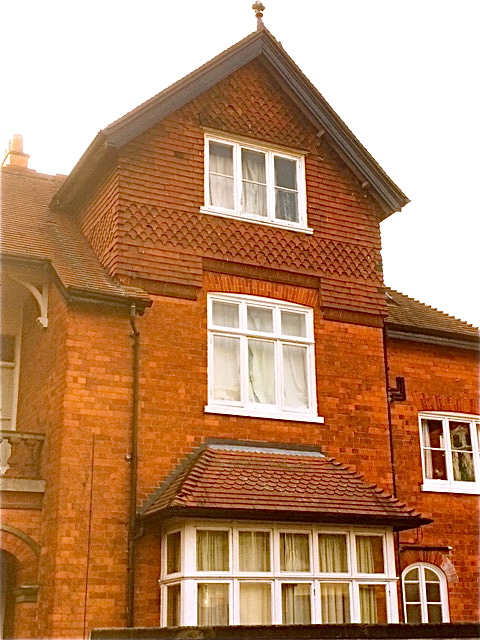
1 Eastcliff Road, Lincoln

- 1 & 2 Eastcliff Road (off Lindum Terrace) Lincoln. 1896. Two houses in Arts and Crafts style developed by the Lincoln builders H S and W Close. Both brick with tile hangings. According to the Lincoln Buildings applications No 1 is by H S Close and No. 2 is by Goddard and Son. As both houses are similar in design, both must have been designed by Goddard and built by the Close brothers.

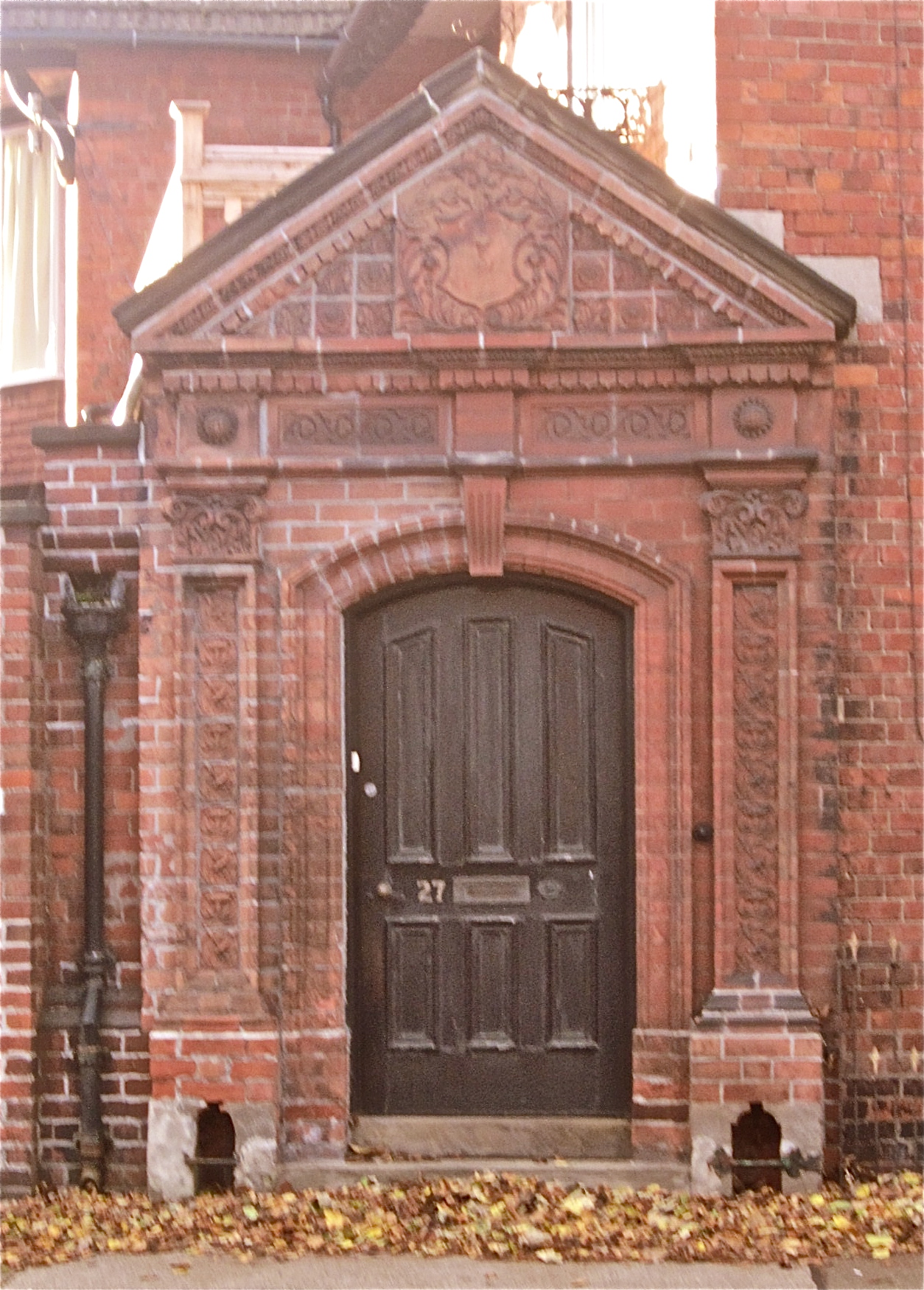
Terracotta Archway, Eastfield, 27 Wragby Road, Lincoln

- Eastfield, 27 Wragby Road. Lincoln. 1893 A house which F. H. Goddard had built for himself shortly before his retirement. Art and Crafts in style, facing to the south, with a largely blank brick wall towards the road, but with a massive terracotta Elizabethan Renaissance revival doorway as an entrance from the road. The terracotta was probably manufactured by the Lincoln firm of Fambrini & Daniels.

=== Church Restoration ===
- Swayfield, Rebuilt part of church1875-6.
- Timberland. Restoration of church, 1887.
- Normanby by Spital. Restoration of church in 1890.

== Sources ==
- Antram N (revised), Pevsner N & Harris J, (1989), The Buildings of England: Lincolnshire, Yale University Press.
- Antonia Brodie (ed), Directory of British Architects, 1834–1914: 2 Vols, British Architectural Library, Royal Institute of British Architects, 2001, Vol 1, pg. 735.
- Brandwood, G.K. and Cherry, M.(1990), Men of property, the Goddards and six generations of architecture Leicester Museum Service.
- Obituaries. (1899) Building News, vol. 76, pg.369. Builder, vol. 76, pg.281. Times 11 March 1899, pg. 10.
