= The Old Barracks =

The Old Barracks may refer to the following former military installations in England:

- The Old Barracks, Grantham, Lincolnshire
- The Old Barracks, Lincoln, Lincolnshire
- The Old Barracks, Newcastle-under-Lyme, Staffordshire
- The Old Barracks, Warwick, Warwickshire

== See also ==
- Old Barracks Museum, a historic building in Trenton, New Jersey
