= Jack Cooper =

Jack Cooper may refer to:

== Arts and entertainment ==
- Jack L. Cooper (1888–1970), first African-American radio DJ
- Jackie Cooper (1922–2011), actor and film director
- Jack Cooper (American musician) (born 1963), composer, arranger, orchestrator, multireedist and music educator
- Jack Cooper (English musician) (born 1980), musician, member of Ultimate Painting, Mazes and The Beep Seals

== Sports ==
- Jack Cooper (Australian rules footballer, born 1889) (1889–1917), Australian rules footballer for Fitzroy
- Jack Cooper (Australian rules footballer, born 1911) (1911–1996), Australian rules footballer for Carlton
- Jack Cooper (Australian rules footballer, born 1922) (1922–2003), Australian rules footballer for Carlton
- Jack Cooper (English footballer) (1889–?), English football goalkeeper
- Jack A. Cooper, English athlete

== Other ==
- Jack Cooper, businessman who owned Cooper Canada
- Jack Cooper, Baron Cooper of Stockton Heath (1908–1988), British politician & activist
- Jack Cooper, main protagonist of Titanfall 2

== See also ==
- John Cooper (disambiguation)
- Johnny Cooper (disambiguation)
- Jacki Cooper (born 1967), musician
