= John Cowper =

John Cowper may refer to:

- John Cowper (MP), MP for Petersfield
- John Sedgwick Cowper, member of the Legislative Assembly of British Columbia

== See also ==
- John Cooper (disambiguation)
