= Johnny Cooper =

Johnny Cooper may refer to:

- John Cooper Clarke (born 1949), English performance artist
- Jonny Cooper (born 1989), Gaelic footballer
- Johnny Cooper (Home and Away), a character in the Australian television series Home and Away
- Johnny Tahu Cooper (1929–2014), a.k.a. The Maori Cowboy, New Zealand rock n' roll musician

== See also ==
- John Cooper (disambiguation)
- Jack Cooper (disambiguation)
- Jon Cooper (disambiguation)
