= John Henry Cooper =

English architect (c.1855–1910)

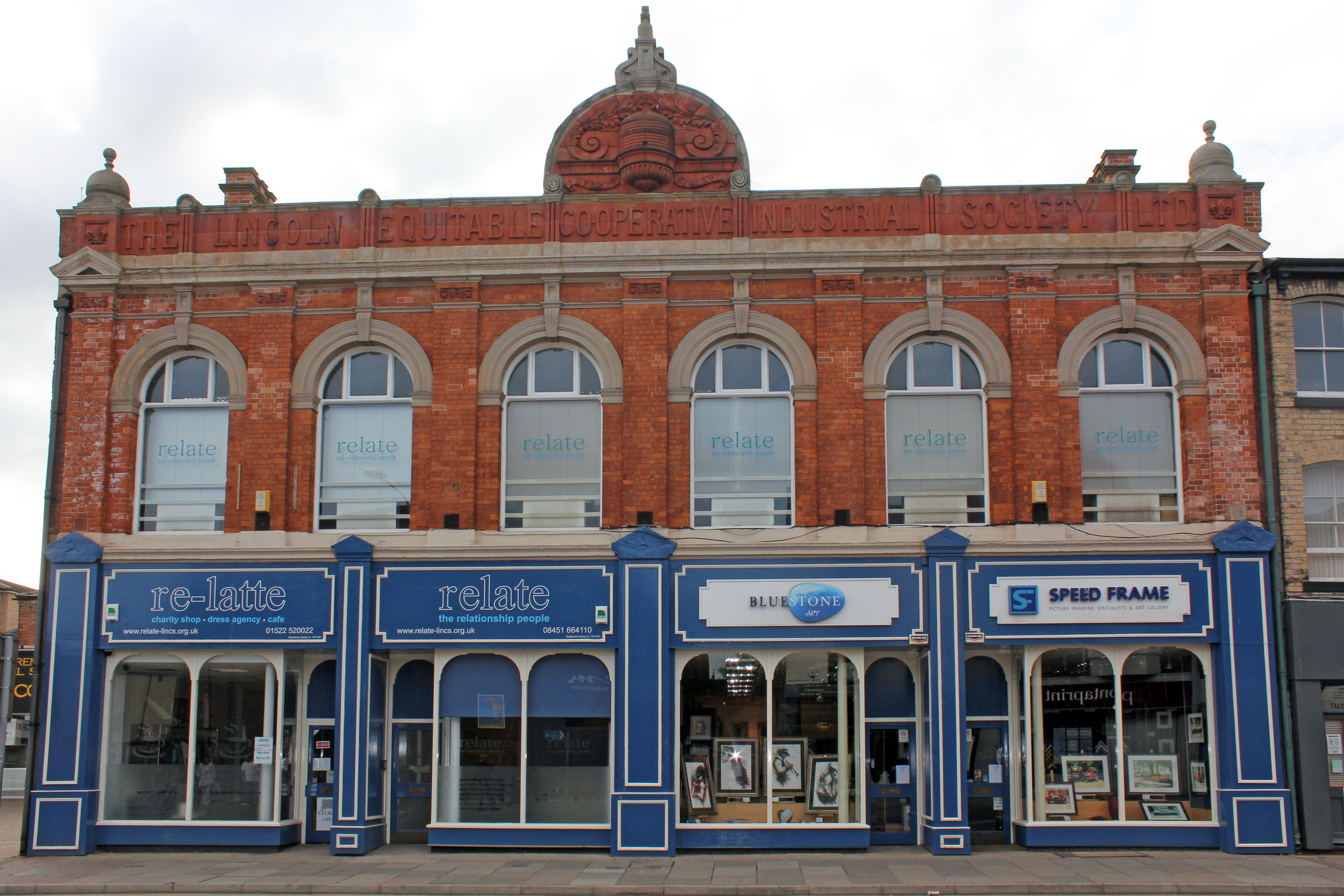
- The Co-operative Sub-Central stores,
- Born: c.1855
- Died: 19 November 1910; Lincoln
- Occupation: Architect
- Buildings: South Bar Congregational Church, High Street, Lincoln 1902

John Henry Cooper (c. 1855 – 19 November 1910) was an architect who worked in Lincoln, Lincolnshire. Initially he worked for the Lincoln architect Henry Goddard, but had set up his own practice by 1888. He designed shops, chapels and houses in Lincoln and Lincolnshire, and he was surveyor to the Lincoln Co-operative Society.

== Career, practice and family ==
Cooper worked from Eastwick, Lindum Hill, Lincoln. He was described as "architect and surveyor" and was also an agent for the Sun Life Fire and Insurance Company. The Lincoln architect Fred Baker worked as his assistant from 1897 to 1900. He married Sarah Fermidge Gresham at St Peter at Gowts Church, Lincoln on 29 September 1878. He died in Lincoln on Monday 14 November 1910

== Architectural work ==
=== Methodist and Congregational churches and chapels ===
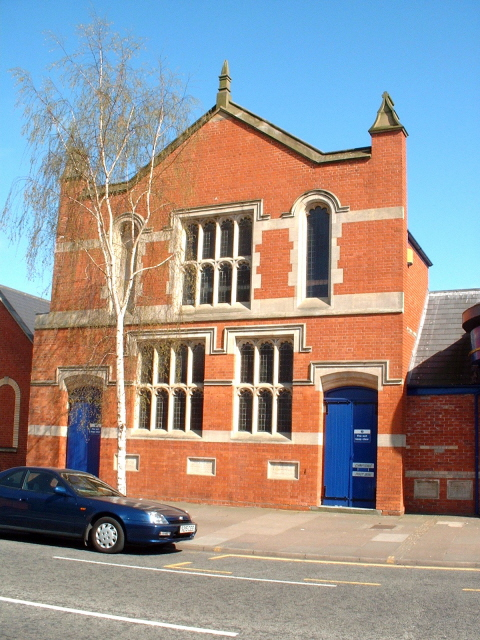
The former South Bar Congregational Church, 1901

- Monks Road Congregational Church, Lincoln.
- South Bar Congregational Church and School Buildings, High Street, Lincoln. (1901). Cooper advertised for tenders for building work in August 1901.
- Wesleyan Chapel, Rowston, Lincolnshire. (1901)
- Portland Street Free Methodist Church. Opened in 1903
- Primitive Methodist Chapel Croft Street, Lincoln. (1904)

=== Shops and bank ===
- Lincoln and Lindsey Bank, 8 Market Place, Spalding. New Bank and alterations to existing building.
- The Co-operative Sub-Central Store, 137-141 High Street Lincoln. 1893. An early department store. The building was sold by the Lincoln Co-operative Society in November 1971. The building was opened in September 1893 and described as follows ‘’Central Store. The building, which consists of three commodious shops and extensive warehouses, is of red brick with stone dressings, and a terra cotta parapet I tearing the name of the Society and a coat of arms. The windows are fitted with plate glass, and the walls in the interior of the shops are covered with varnished red deal boarding. From the centre shop there is a capital approach by means of a broad flight of stairs to the upper and the cellaring beneath the shop, which are splendidly lighted by means of pavement lights, will be used for storage. The building is admirably arranged, and no expense has been spared in necessary fittings suitable for such an establishment.’’
- 62 and 63 High Street, Lincoln. Erection of a new Pawnbroker’s shop for Frederick Choice.

=== Houses ===
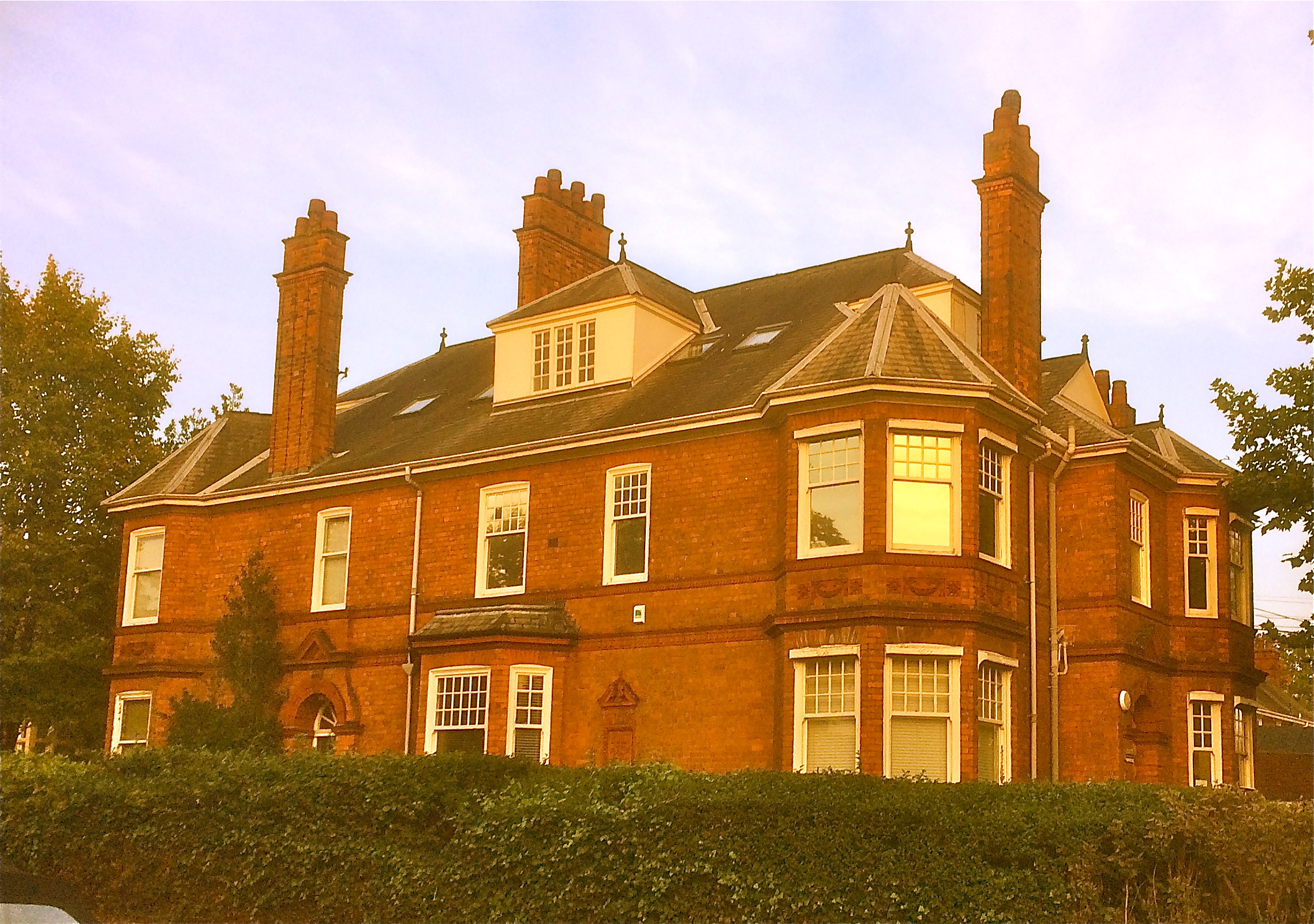
15/17, The Avenue, Lincoln 1896

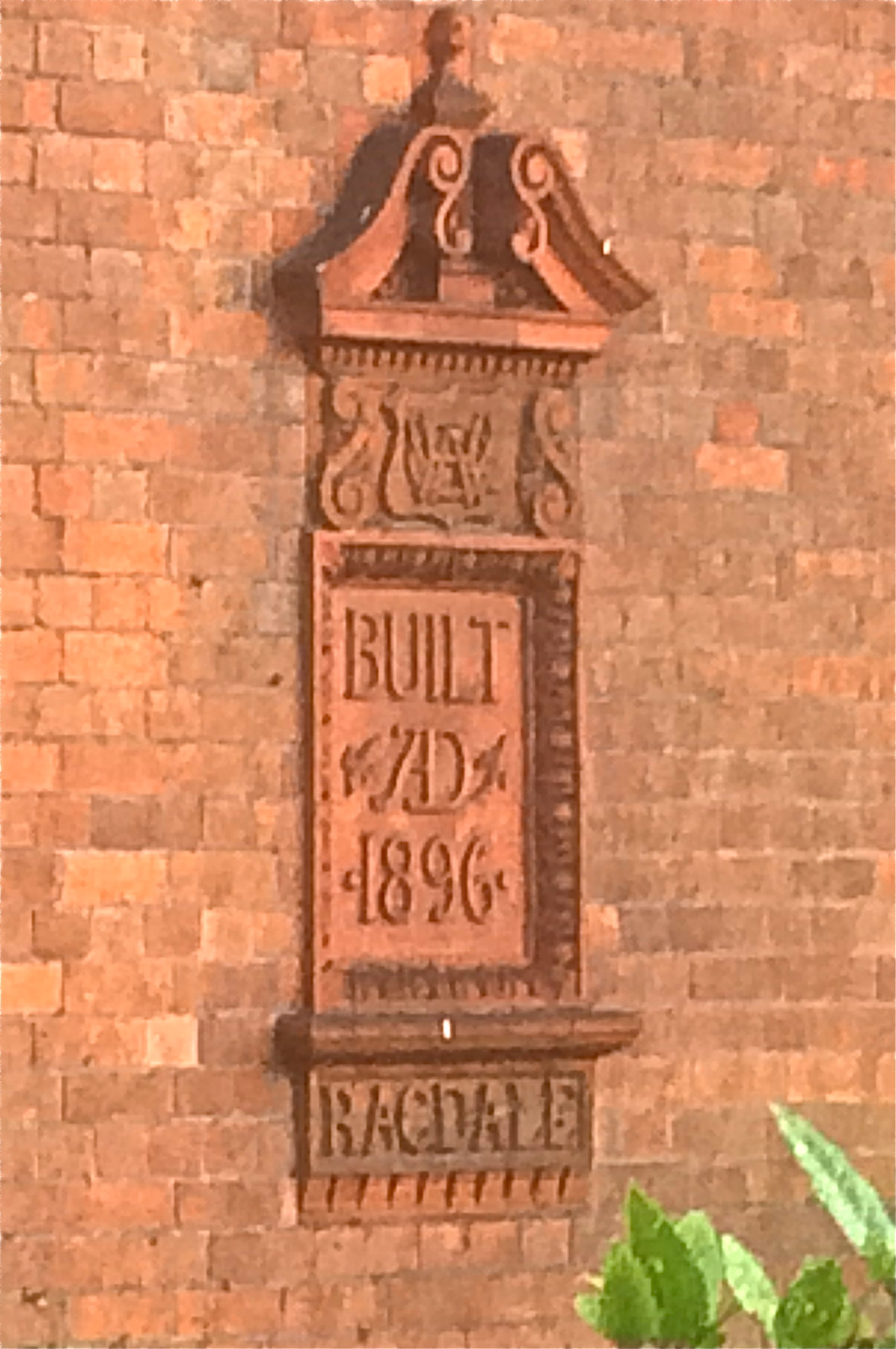
Ragdale, 15 The Avenue, Lincoln. Monogram of W G Henton

- 15 & 17 The Avenue, Double villa house built in red brick with three side bay windows at the corners with decorative terracotta panels. Doorways with terracotta surrounds on street frontage and on south side with terracotta date panel on frontage of no. 11, "Ragdale 1896". Built for W G Henton, his initials forming the monogram above the date panel.
- 181-185 Carholme Road, Lincoln.
- 83-89 Hewson Road, Lincoln
- 9-27 Bargate, Lincoln
- 5-12 St Giles Avenue, Lincoln. Built for Joseph Ruston

==== Stonefield Avenue, Lincoln ====
A residential cul-de-Sac to the north of Church Lane. Laid out by Cooper in 1894-5 for John Swan of Stonefield House. Houses by Cooper are in Arts & Crafts Style with tile hanging and timber framing.

- 1-3 Stonefield Avenue
- 2-4 Stonefield Avenue
- 6-8 Stonefield Avenue.

==== St Giles Avenues, Lincoln ====
- 19 St Giles Detached house built for C Gregory. Hipped roof with convex curve at base over projecting eaves. On frontage, central entrance door with brick arch, two large rectangular bay windows on ground floor supporting, with two timber entrance piers, balcony on 1st floor with timber and iron railing.
- 5-12 St Giles Avenue. Eight houses built for Joseph Ruston.
