= Lincoln Drill Hall =

Former drill hall in Lincoln, England

The Drill, Lincoln
- Lincoln
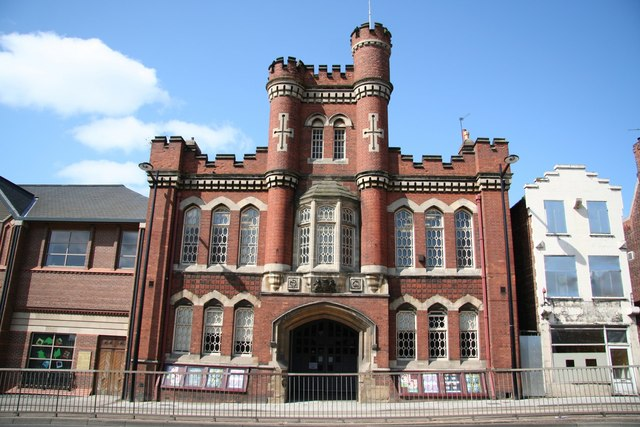
- Broadgate frontage

Site information
- Type: Drill Hall
- Owner: Lincoln College Group
- Operator: Lincoln College Group

Location
- Location within Lincolnshire
- Coordinates: 53.2298°N 0.5375°W

Site history
- Built: 1890
- Built for: War Office
- Architect: Henry Goddard
- In use: 1890–1999

The Drill, previously known as Lincoln Drill Hall, is a former drill hall in Lincoln, England, which is now used as a multi-purpose community hub, hosting live music, comedy shows, pantomimes and live wrestling performances. It is currently under the stewardship of the Lincoln College Group. After being fully refurbished, and renovated, it re-opened to the public on 11 December 2021.

== History ==
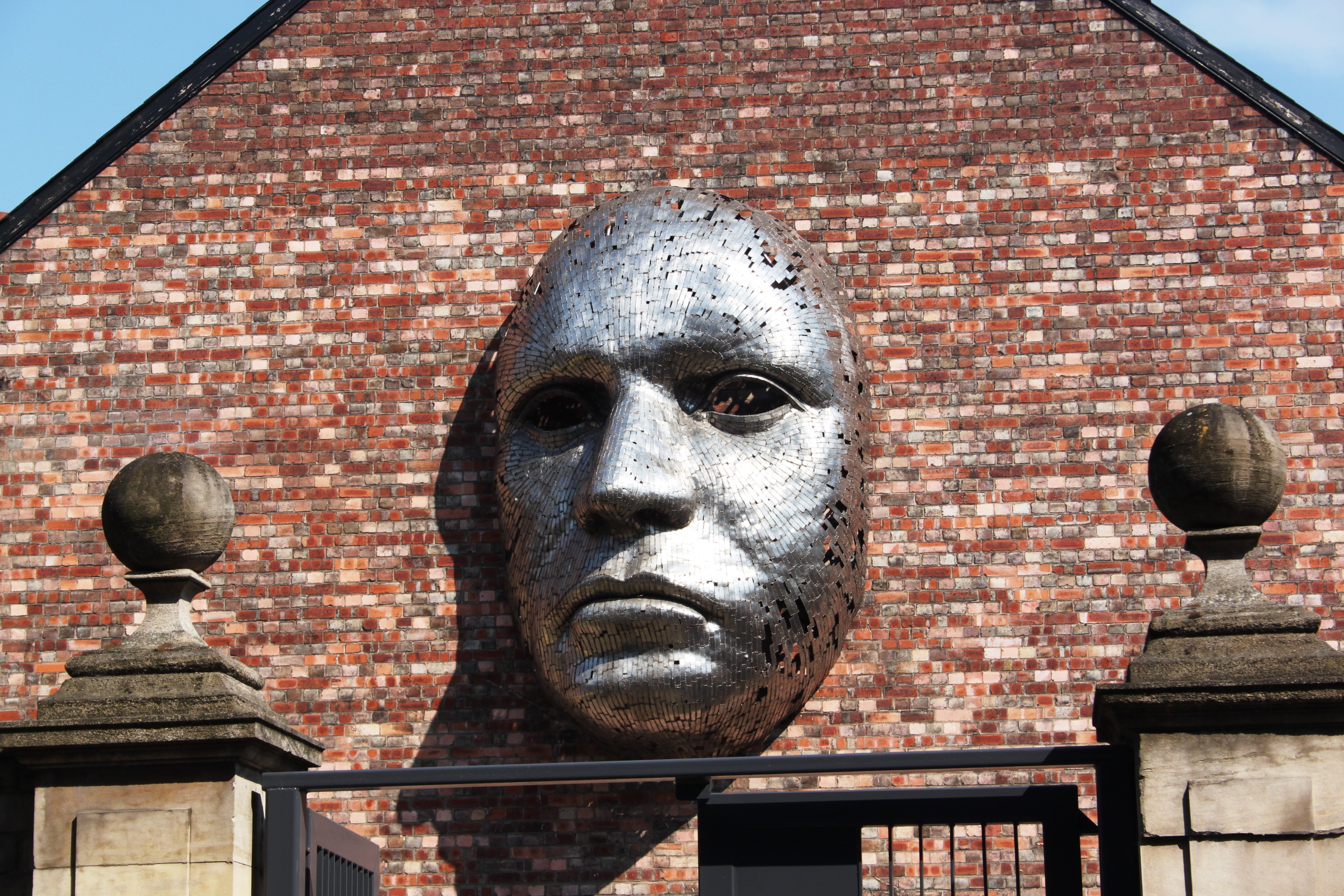
Sculpture on the exterior wall by Rick Kirby

The building was designed by architects Goddard and Son for the 1st Lincolnshire Rifle Volunteers and construction was financed by Joseph Ruston, a former M.P. for the city. It was opened in 1890 and, although purpose-built for military training, community and social events were held in the hall from an early stage. The 1st Lincolnshire Rifle Volunteers evolved to become to 4th Battalion of the Lincolnshire Regiment in 1908. The battalion was mobilised at the drill hall in August 1914 before being deployed to the Western Front. The 4th Battalion was reconstituted after the Second World War and amalgamated with the 6th Battalion to form the 4th/6th Battalion in 1950.

Various forms of entertainment were held at the hall - the most notable performance being a gig by The Rolling Stones on New Year's Eve, 1963; the following day they made their debut on the BBC's Top of the Pops television show.

In 1967 the 2nd (Duchess of Gloucester's Own Royal Lincolnshire and Northamptonshire) Company, 5th (Volunteer) Battalion, The Royal Anglian Regiment was formed in Lincoln. The building continued to be used for military training for most of the rest of the century but increasingly fell into disrepair and closed in 1999. However, by public demand it was reopened four years later following a £2.6m refurbishment programme. The principal contractor was local company Lindum Construction. In 2010 the Council passed day-to-day control to the independent Lincoln Arts Trust. The building was managed by the Ruston Hall Trust, a subsidiary charity of the Lincoln Arts Trust until the city council voted to stop its annual grant of £187,000 and it closed in March 2020.

Saved from permanent closure by the Lincoln College Group, the venue was extensively renovated and refurbished in late 2021, reopening in December for a series of pantomime performances. The building (with the adjacent clubhouse) is a Grade II Listed Building.

== Facilities ==
The main auditorium has a maximum capacity of around 500 and it has hosted various bands - Buzzcocks, The Damned, Stiff Little Fingers, Iron Maiden, Seth Lakeman and The Subways being notable examples. The venue has also hosted comedy acts including Russell Howard, Marcus Brigstocke and Mark Thomas. It also acts as a cafe with a seating area inside as well as a restaurant, called The Limelight, which is expected to open to the public in spring 2022. It also hosts the Lincoln Beer Festival each year.

Following the construction of the city's new music venue, the Engine Shed - which has enabled big name, established bands to visit the city - The Drill has become the first-choice venue for up and coming bands from across the United Kingdom when they are in Lincoln. As well as bands, The Drill hosts theatre, literature talks, films, classical music, the Red Herring Comedy Club among other comedy nights, workshops and business meetings. It also plays host to the much-loved disability club night, The Butterfly Club, providing a uniquely inclusive party experience for people with learning disabilities and physical impairments.

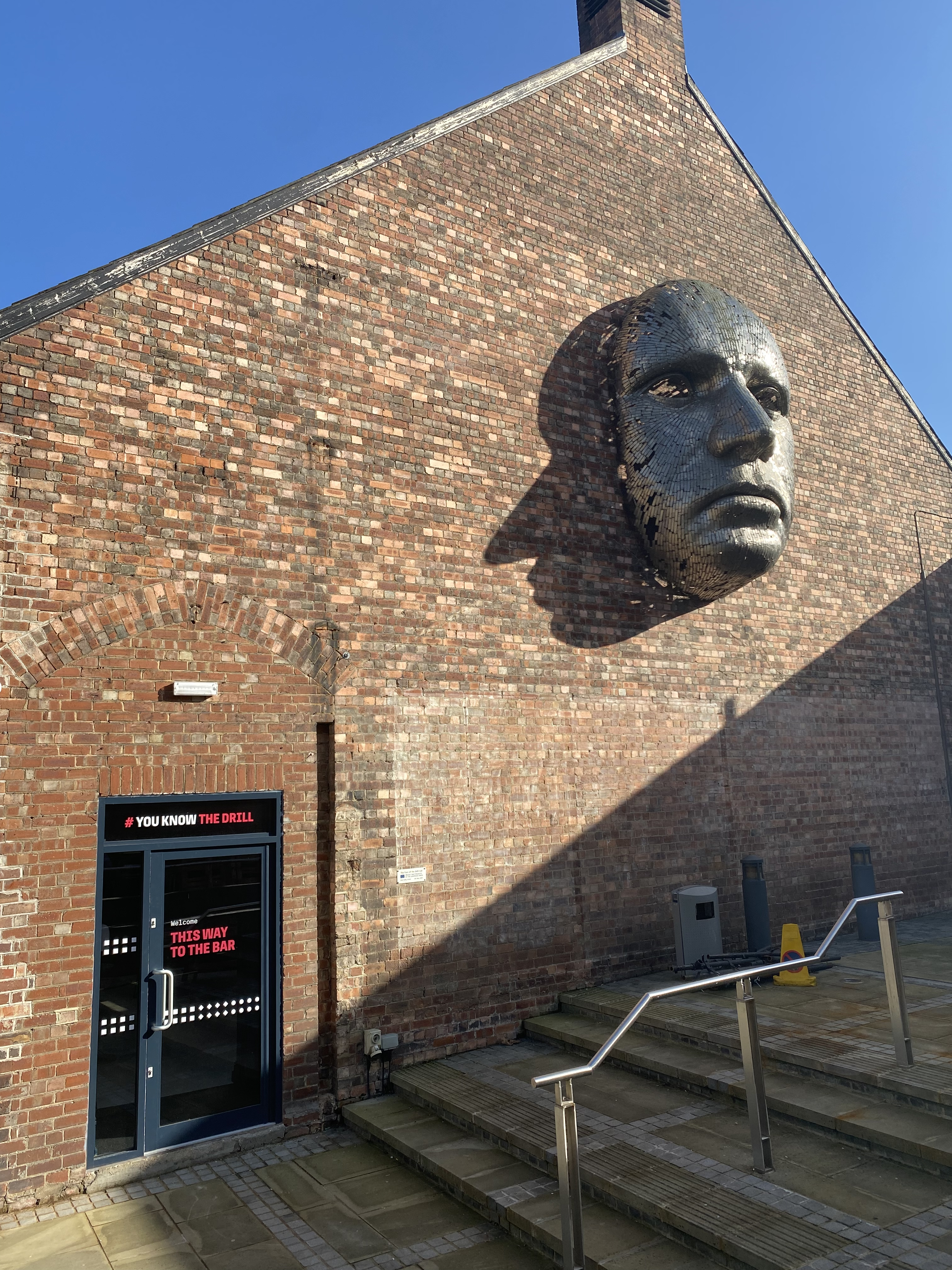
The Drill, Lincoln, Free School Lane

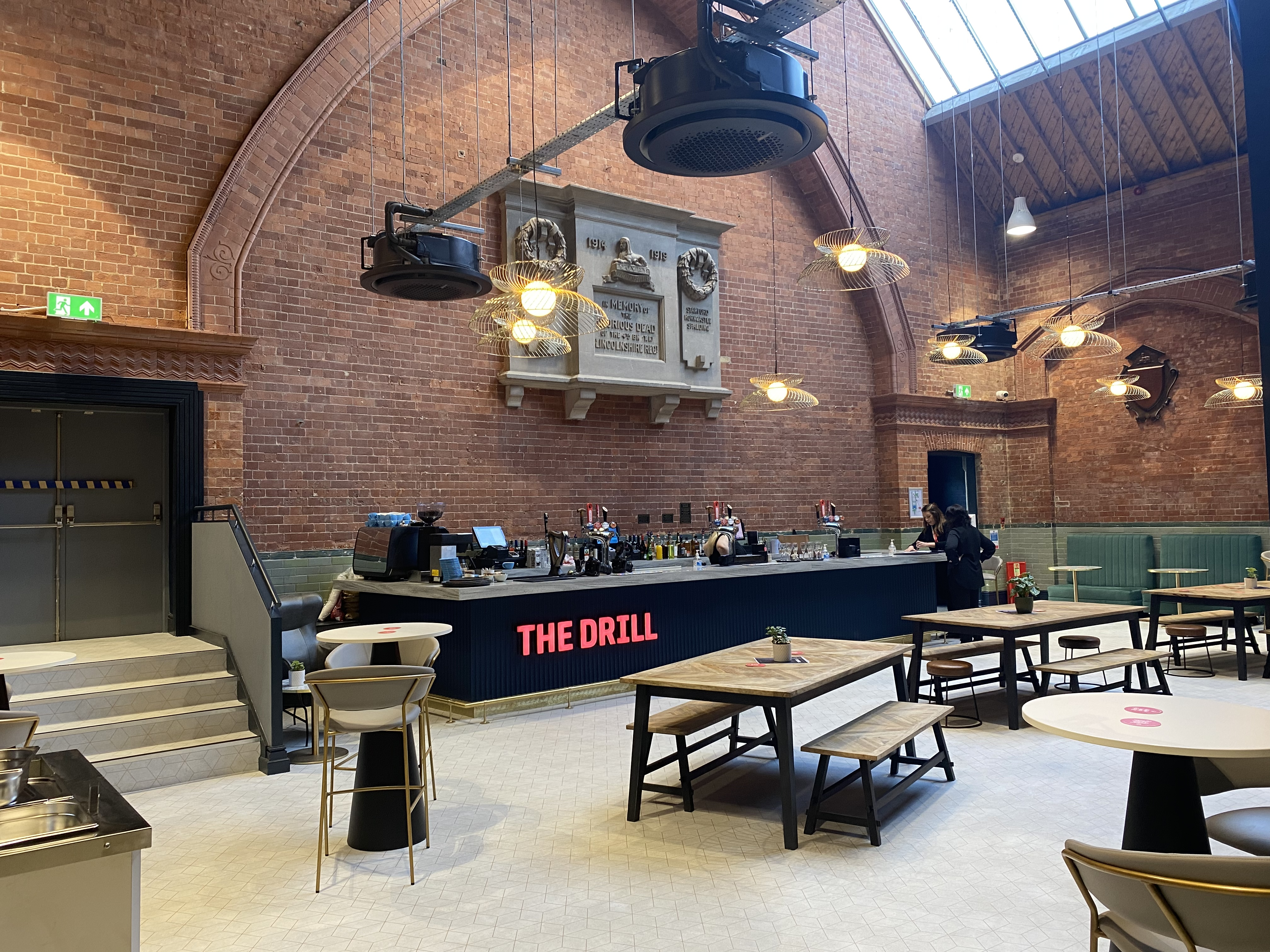
The bar and cafe area of the revamped venue, pictured in spring 2022

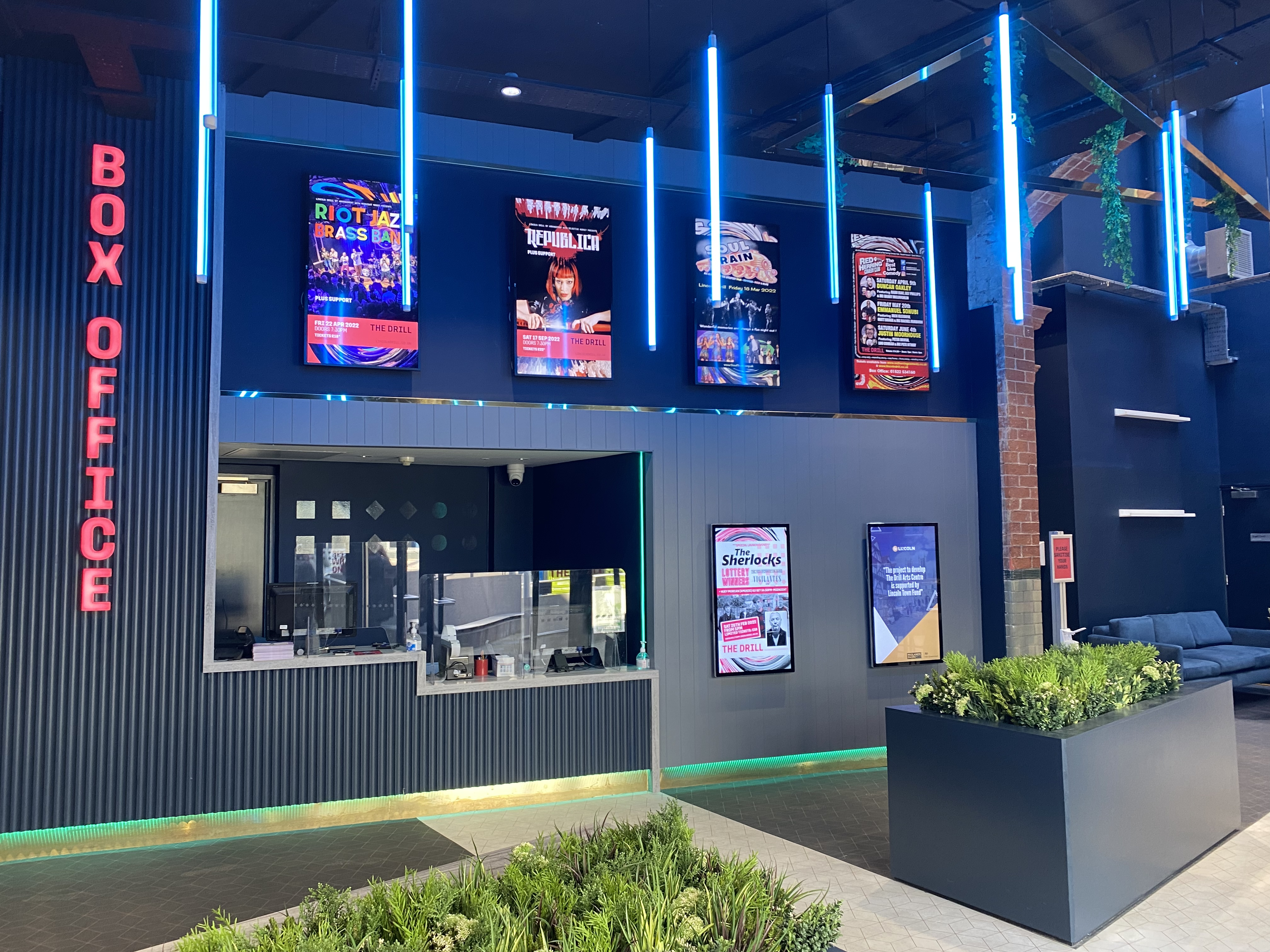
The Box Office at The Drill, Lincoln
