= The Old Barracks, Grantham =

Former military installation in Grantham

The Old Barracks
- Grantham
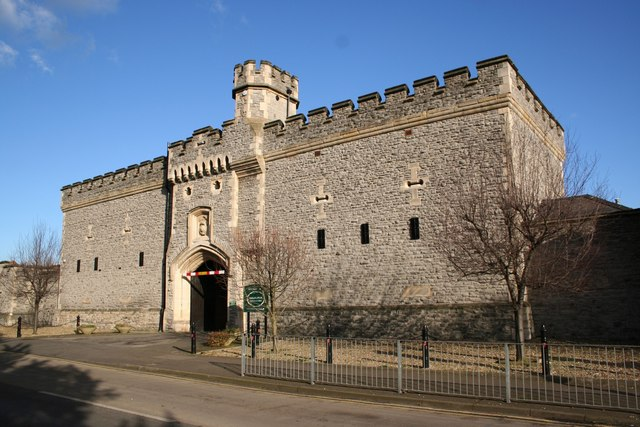
- The Old Barracks

Site information
- Type: Barracks

Location
- Location within Lincolnshire
- Coordinates: 52.91220°N 0.63261°W

Site history
- Built: 1858
- Built for: War Office
- In use: 1858-Present

Listed Building – Grade II
- Designated: 20 April 1972
- Reference no.: 1062467

The Old Barracks is a former military installation in Sandon Road, Grantham. It is a Grade II listed building.

== History ==
The old barracks in Grantham were designed for the South Lincoln Militia and completed in 1858. The design work was probably carried out by Henry Goddard. The South Lincoln Militia evolved to become the 4th (Special Reserve) Battalion, the Lincolnshire Regiment in 1881. After the 4th (Special Reserve) Battalion was disbanded in 1908, the barracks were occupied by B Company, 4th Battalion, the Lincolnshire Regiment (Territorial Force).

In 1901, the barracks also became the home of A Squadron, the Lincolnshire Yeomanry. The squadron was mobilised at the old barracks in August 1914 before being deployed to Salonika in 1915. The building was used as an Auxiliary Military Hospital during the First World War was used by the yeomanry squadron again after the war until the squadron was disbanded in 1920.

After the 4th Battalion, the Royal Lincolnshire Regiment amalgamated with the 6th Battalion to form 4th/6th Battalion, The Royal Lincolnshire Regiment in 1950, the building was decommissioned and taken out of military use. It was used by local bands during the 1960s and 1970s and by Grantham College in the 1980s before being converted into offices at the end of that decade.

== Sources ==
- Antram, N; Pevsner, N; Harris, J (1989). The Buildings of England: Lincolnshire. Yale University Press.
