= Corn Exchange, Alford =

Commercial building in Alford, Lincolnshire, England

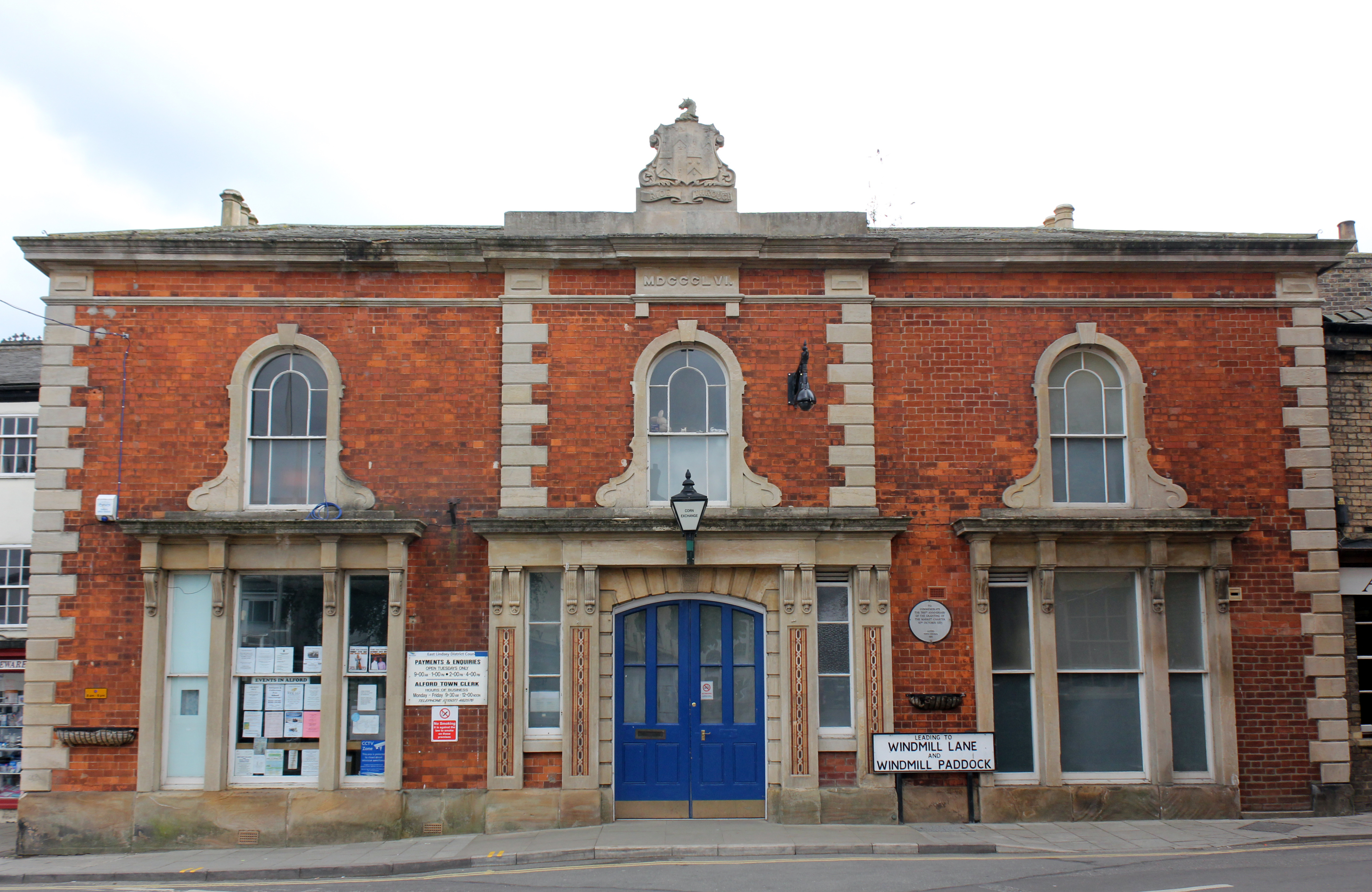
- Corn Exchange, Alford

- Shown in Lincolnshire
- 53.2609°N 0.1795°E
- Location: Market Place, Alford

History
- Built: 1857

Site notes
- Architect: Henry Goddard
- Architectural style: Italianate style

Listed Building – Grade II
- Official name: Corn Exchange
- Designated: 30 June 1986
- Reference no.: 1063034

The Corn Exchange is a commercial building in the Market Place in Alford, Lincolnshire, England. The structure, which is currently used as a community events venue, is a Grade II listed building.

== History ==
In the mid-19th century, a group of local businessmen decided to form a company, to be known as the "Alford Corn Exchange Company", to finance and commission a purpose-built corn exchange for the town. The site they selected, on the south side of the Market Place, was leased to a local ironmonger and gunsmith, Robert Mason: the lord of the manor, Robert Nisbet-Hamilton, whose seat was at Bloxholm Hall, agreed to donate a freehold interest in the site to the directors of the new company.

The building was designed by Henry Goddard in the Italianate style, built in red brick with stone dressings at a cost of £1,400 and was officially opened on 5 February 1857. The design involved a symmetrical main frontage of three bays facing onto the Market Place. The central bay, which was slightly projected forward, featured a segmentally headed doorway with a rusticated surround flanked by pairs of pilasters, decorated by coloured tiles, and by brackets supporting an entablature and a cornice. The outer bays were fenestrated on the ground floor by tri-partite windows with brackets supporting entablatures and cornices. The bays on the first floor were fenestrated by round headed windows with architraves, supported by distinctive scrolls, and with keystones. There was a date stone above the central window. At the corners there were quoins, and, at roof level, there was a cornice surmounted by a centrally-placed carved coat of arms. The architectural historian, Nikolaus Pevsner, was unimpressed by the design and described it as "drab".

The use of the building as a corn exchange declined significantly in the wake of the Great Depression of British Agriculture in the late 19th century. Instead it was used for local community events and, although Robert Nisbet-Hamilton had originally insisted that it must not be used for religious or political events, that restriction was lifted by his descendent, Lady Mary Georgina Constance Christopher Nisbet Hamilton Ogilby, in 1902. It was subsequently used for lectures, dances, and balls, and, from 1913, it also showed silent films. Following local government re-organisation in 1974, it also became the offices and meeting place of the local town council.

A community interest company, known as the "Alford Corn Exchange and Community Group", took responsibility for the management and ownership of the building in 2014. The group subsequently commissioned an extensive programme of refurbishment works, which involved the installation of a fully licensed bar, a café area and a kitchen, as well as the restoration of the fabric of the building.

== See also ==
- Corn exchanges in England
