= Corn Exchange, Market Rasen =

Commercial building in Market Rasen, Lincolnshire, England

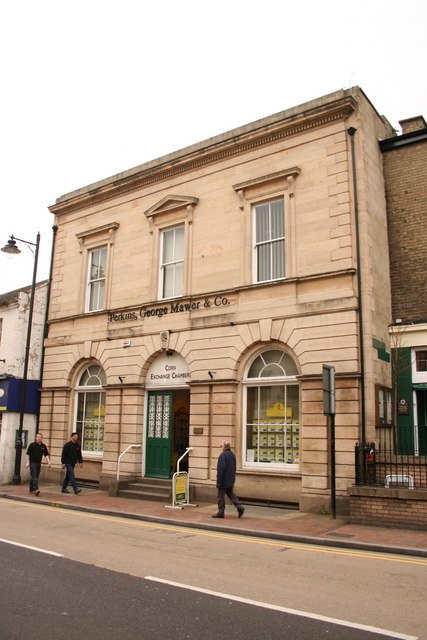
- Corn Exchange, Market Rasen

- Shown in Lincolnshire
- 53.3885°N 0.3353°W
- Location: Queen Street, Market Rasen

History
- Built: 1854

Site notes
- Architect: Henry Goddard
- Architectural style: Italianate style

Listed Building – Grade II
- Official name: Corn Exchange
- Designated: 16 May 1984
- Reference no.: 1309121

The Corn Exchange is a commercial building in Queen Street, Market Rasen, Lincolnshire, England. The structure, which is used as the offices of a firm of charted surveyors, is a Grade II listed building.

== History ==
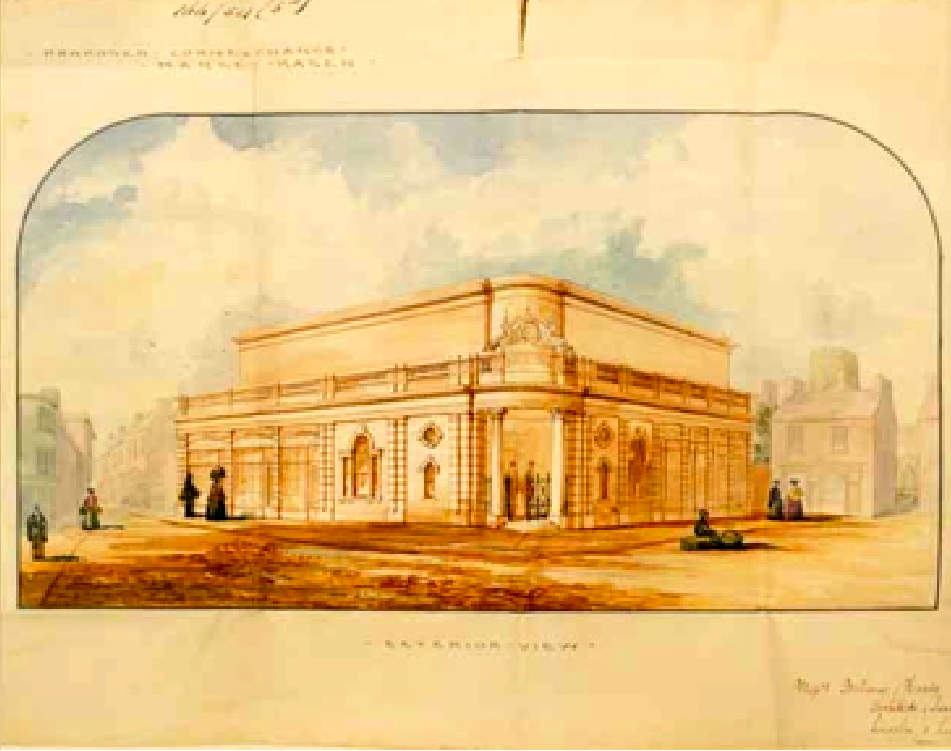
The rival corn exchange established in the Market Place, which has since been demolished

In the mid-19th century, a group of local businessmen decided to form a company, to be known as the "Market Rasen Corn Exchange and Market Company", to finance and commission a corn exchange for the town. After some debate, they selected a site on the north side of Queen Street

The building was designed by Henry Goddard in the Italianate style, built in ashlar stone and was completed in July 1854. The design involved a symmetrical main frontage of three bays facing onto Queen Street. The ground floor was rusticated and each of the bays was flanked by pilasters. The central bay featured a round headed doorway with a keystone decorated with a carved wheatsheaf, while the outer bays featured round headed windows with keystones. The first floor was fenestrated with sash windows; the central window was surmounted by a triangular pediment supported by corbels, while the outer windows were surmounted by cornices which were also supported by corbels. At roof level, there was a modillioned cornice.

A rival faction, who had dissented over the location chosen, commissioned an alternative hall designed by Bellamy and Hardy on the corner of the Market Place and the High Street. The Market Place building opened in September 1854, but almost immediately got into financial difficulty. After a merger of the two operations in 1856, the Queen Street building became the sole corn exchange in the town. (Note: The rival building in the Market Place featured a corner portico flanked by Doric order columns supporting an entablature, and Venetian windows on two sides of the building. It went on to become a market for the sale of dairy products as well as the local town hall; it was converted for use as a cinema showing silent films in 1914, but after becoming dilapidated, was demolished in 1960.)

The use of the Queen Street building as a corn exchange declined significantly in the wake of the Great Depression of British Agriculture in the late 19th century. Instead, it became a public events venue hosting balls, concerts and public meetings. It also became the meeting place of the local masonic lodge, "Bayons Lodge".

In May 1945, a dance was arranged in the building to celebrate Victory in Europe Day, in the latter stages of the Second World War. After the war and, into the 21st century, regular auctions of agricultural goods were held in the corn exchange sale room. An extensive programme of refurbishment works was completed in 2008, and the building subsequently became the offices of a firm of chartered surveyors, Perkins, George Mawer & Co.

== See also ==
- Corn exchanges in England
