= John Cooper (Scottish footballer) =

Scottish footballer

Personal information
- Full name: John Christie Cooper
- Date of birth: 23 August 1908
- Place of birth: Cathcart, Scotland
- Date of death: 25 June 1940 (aged 31)
- Place of death: Pollok, Scotland
- Positions: Left back; centre half

Senior career*
| Years | Team | Apps | (Gls) |
| 1932–1936 | Queen's Park | 54 | (0) |

International career
| 1932–1935 | Scotland Amateurs | 3 | (0) |
- * Club domestic league appearances and goals

John Christie Cooper (23 August 1908 – 25 June 1940) was a Scottish amateur footballer who played in the Scottish League for Queen's Park as a left back. He was capped by Scotland at amateur level.
