= John Cooper (cricketer, born 1855) =

English cricketer and solicitor

Personal information
- Full name: John Frederick Cooper
- Born: 14 February 1855; Henley-on-Thames, Oxfordshire, England
- Died: 30 January 1928 (aged 72); Henley-on-Thames, Oxfordshire, England
- Batting: Right-handed

Domestic team information
- Years: Team
- 1881: Marylebone Cricket Club

Career statistics
Competition	First-class
Matches	1
Runs scored	0
Batting average	0.00
100s/50s	–/–
Top score	0
Catches/stumpings	–/–
- Source: Cricinfo, 4 May 2021

John Frederick Cooper (14 February 1855 – 30 January 1928) was an English first-class cricketer and solicitor.

Cooper was born at Henley-on-Thames in February 1855. He was educated at Marlborough College, where he played for the school cricket team. He was described by Wisden as "a very good bat, plays in beautiful form, and has a very pretty and effective cut". His one first-class appearance came for the Marylebone Cricket Club against Hampshire at Southampton in 1881, being dismissed without scoring by Charles Young in the MCC's only innings. In addition to playing first-class cricket, Cooper also played minor matches for Shropshire and Wiltshire.

Cooper was admitted as a solicitor in 1879 and later became registrar for the County Court, in addition to holding the office of Town Clerk of Henley. He was for more than thirty years the secretary of the Henley Royal Regatta, having been appointed in 1881. Cooper died at Henley in January 1928, following a brief illness of three days.
