= John Cooper (rugby union) =

England international rugby union player

- Full name: John Graham Cooper
- Born: 3 June 1881 Birmingham, England
- Died: 26 October 1965 (aged 84) Mont Boron, Nice, France

Rugby union career
- Position: Forward
International career
| Years | Team | Apps | (Points) |
| 1909 | England | 2 | (0) |

John Graham Cooper (3 June 1881 – 26 October 1965) was an English international rugby union player.

A fullback turned forward, Cooper captained Birmingham club Moseley and in 1909 was capped twice for England. He debuted against the touring Australian team in Blackheath and kept his place for their Home Nations opener at Cardiff Arms Park. Both his appearances were as a forward.

Cooper was a solicitor by profession.

== See also ==
- List of England national rugby union players
