= Museum of Lincolnshire Life =

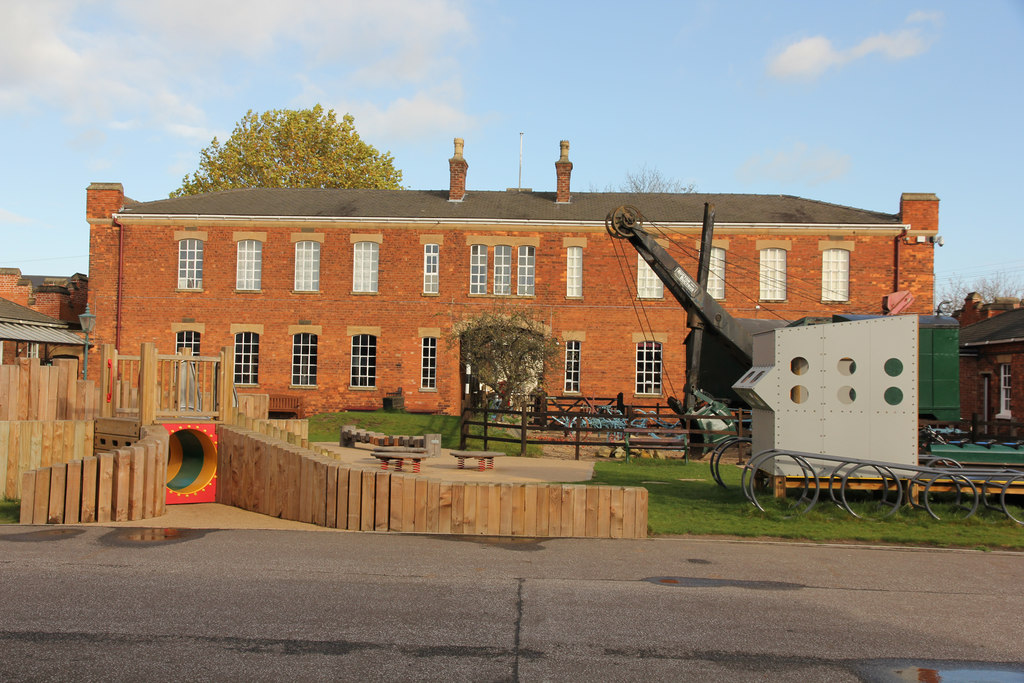
- Museum of Lincolnshire Life

- Lincolnshire
- Established: 1969
- Location: Lincoln
- Coordinates: 53.2379°N 0.5444°W
- Type: Local history museum
- Website: www.lincolnshire.gov.uk/history-and-heritage/museum-of-lincolnshire-life/

The Museum of Lincolnshire Life is a museum in Lincoln, Lincolnshire, in the UK. The museum collection is a varied social history that reflects and celebrates the culture of the county of Lincolnshire and its people from 1750 to the present day. Exhibits illustrate commercial, domestic, agricultural, industrial and community life. The story of the Royal Lincolnshire Regiment and Lincolnshire Yeomanry is explained and illustrated by a variety of methods.

== History ==
The museum was established at the Old Barracks on Burton Road in June 1969. Management of the museum was transferred to Lincolnshire County Council in 1974.

== Collection ==
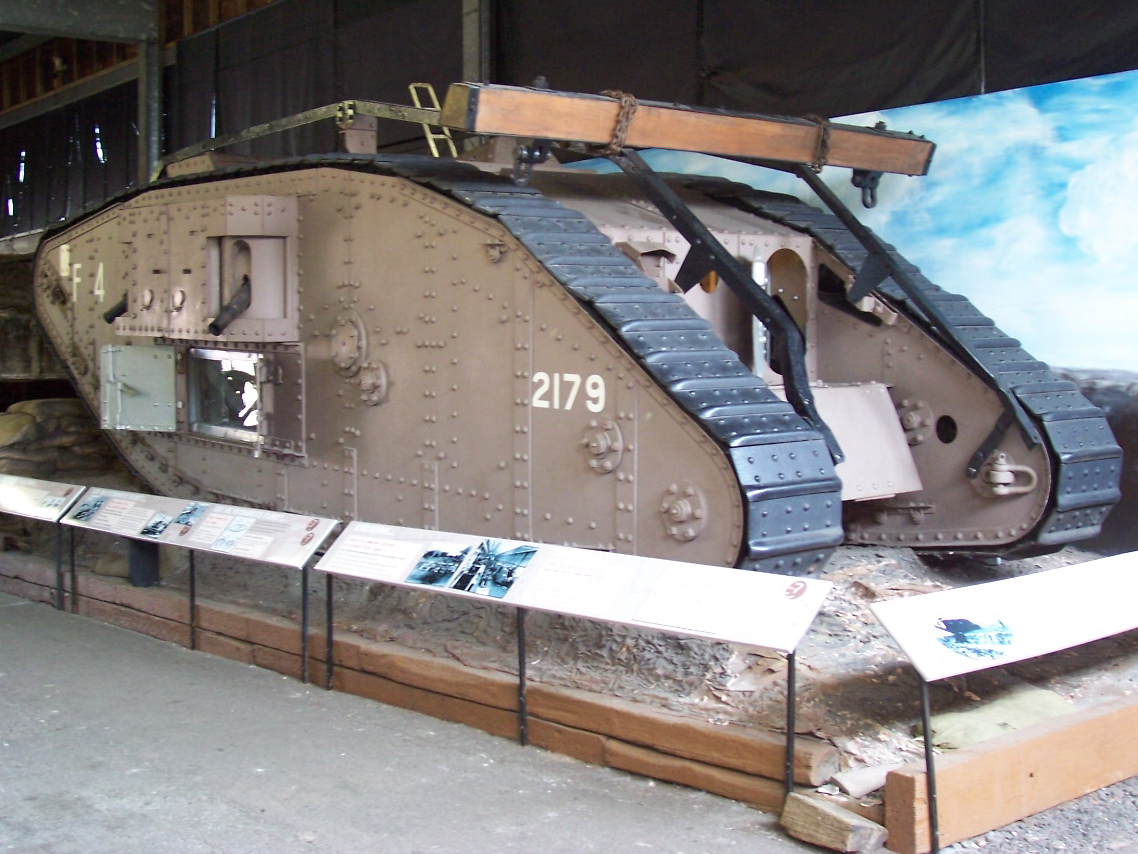
The Mark IV tank in the museum

The museum has a collection of tanks. It thought that it housed one of the first tanks developed during the First World War by the local firm of William Foster & Co. of Lincoln. The tank was believed to be named "Flirt II", a Mark IV Female; however during the filming of inside the tank for the museum's new digital tour guides, a different serial number was discovered than the one that was expected. This led to the discovery that this tank was called "Daphne" and not "Flirt II". They were two completely different tanks. Research has shown that she was issued to the 12th Company, D Battalion of the Tank Corps. She was mentioned in regimental diaries as having been involved in the attacks at Passchendaele in August 1917.

The museum also has exhibits featuring recreations of old shops, house interiors along with an extensive collection of early farm machinery, with examples of machines built by local companies, such as the Field Marshall tractor built in Gainsborough, by Marshall, Sons & Co.

Two early Ruston-Bucyrus excavators are on display in the yard, an RB4 of 1929 and an RB17 of 1937.

== See also ==
- Ellis' Mill, a tower windmill adjacent to the Museum
- Church Farm Museum of Agricultural life in Skegness
- Gordon Boswell Romany Museum, Spalding
