= Jack Cooper (Australian rules footballer, born 1922) =

Australian rules footballer

Personal information
- Full name: John Sylvester Cooper
- Born: 29 December 1922
- Died: 29 September 2003 (aged 80)
- Height: 188 cm (6 ft 2 in)
- Weight: 79 kg (174 lb)
- Position: Full-forward

Playing career^{1}
Years	Club	Games (Goals)
1941, 1945	Subiaco	14 (48)
1947	Carlton	3 (9)
- ^{1} Playing statistics correct to the end of 1947.

John Sylvester Cooper (29 December 1922 – 29 September 2003) was an Australian rules footballer who played with Carlton in the Victorian Football League (VFL).
