= The Old Barracks, Lincoln =

The Old Barracks
- Lincoln
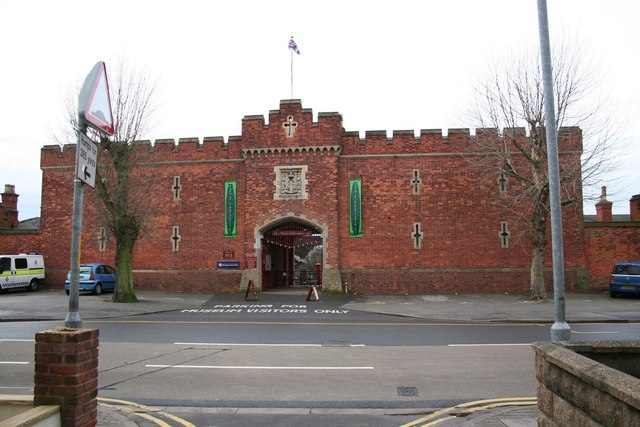
- The Old Barracks

Site information
- Type: Barracks

Location
- Location within Lincolnshire
- Coordinates: 53.2379°N 0.5444°W

Site history
- Built: 1857
- Built for: War Office
- Architect: Henry Goddard
- In use: 1857-1963

Listed Building – Grade II
- Designated: 15 August 1973
- Reference no.: 1388474

The Old Barracks is a former military installation in Burton Road, Lincoln. It is a Grade II listed building.

== History ==
The "old barracks" in Lincoln were designed by Henry Goddard for the North Lincoln Militia and completed in 1857. In 1873 a system of recruiting areas based on counties was instituted under the Cardwell Reforms and the barracks became the depot for the two battalions of the 10th (North Lincolnshire) Regiment of Foot. The regiment moved to the "new barracks" further north on Burton Road in 1880.

The building was vacant until 1901 when it became the headquarters of the Lincolnshire Yeomanry. The regiment was mobilised at the old barracks in August 1914 before being deployed to Salonika. The building remained the headquarters of the Lincolnshire Yeomanry until it was disbanded in 1920. It then became the headquarters of the 60th Field Regiment, Royal Artillery, a Territorial Army unit, in 1922. The regiment was mobilised at the old barracks in September 1939 before being deployed to France with the British Expeditionary Force. The regiment was disbanded at the end of the war without ever returning to the barracks.

After the war the building was used by the 49th (East Midlands) Armoured Workshop Royal Electrical and Mechanical Engineers and then by the 70th Communication Zone Workshop Royal Electrical and Mechanical Engineers before being vacated in 1963. The old barracks became home to the Museum of Lincolnshire Life in July 1969.
