= Canwick Road Old Cemetery =

Cemetery in Lincoln, England

- Canwick Road Old Cemetery
- Interactive map of Canwick Road Old Cemetery

Details
- Established: 1856
- Location: Lincoln, Lincolnshire
- Country: England
- Coordinates: 53.2188°N 0.5296°W
- Type: Former Cemetery
- Owned by: Lincolnshire County Council
- No. of graves: 31,831
- Website: heritage-explorer.lincolnshire.gov.uk/Monument/MLI87378
- Find a Grave: Canwick Road Old Cemetery

Some of the many gravestones and mounds in the cemetery.

Canwick Road Old Cemetery also known as The Old Cemetery or Canwick Road Cemetery was built in 1856 near the city of Lincoln in Lincolnshire, England. The cemetery opened in 1856 and had two chapels of ease designed by Michael Drury in the Gothic Revival style. It was Lincoln's first cemetery.

== History ==
Canwick Road Old Cemetery looking east

Following the Public Health Act 1848, areas of open land on the outskirts of Lincoln designated for use as cemeteries. The cemetery opened in 1856, on an area known as the Cow Paddle. The size and initial building of the cemetery proved controversial with local residents but was eventually passed through the planning stages and built by the architect Michael Drury.

== Chapels ==
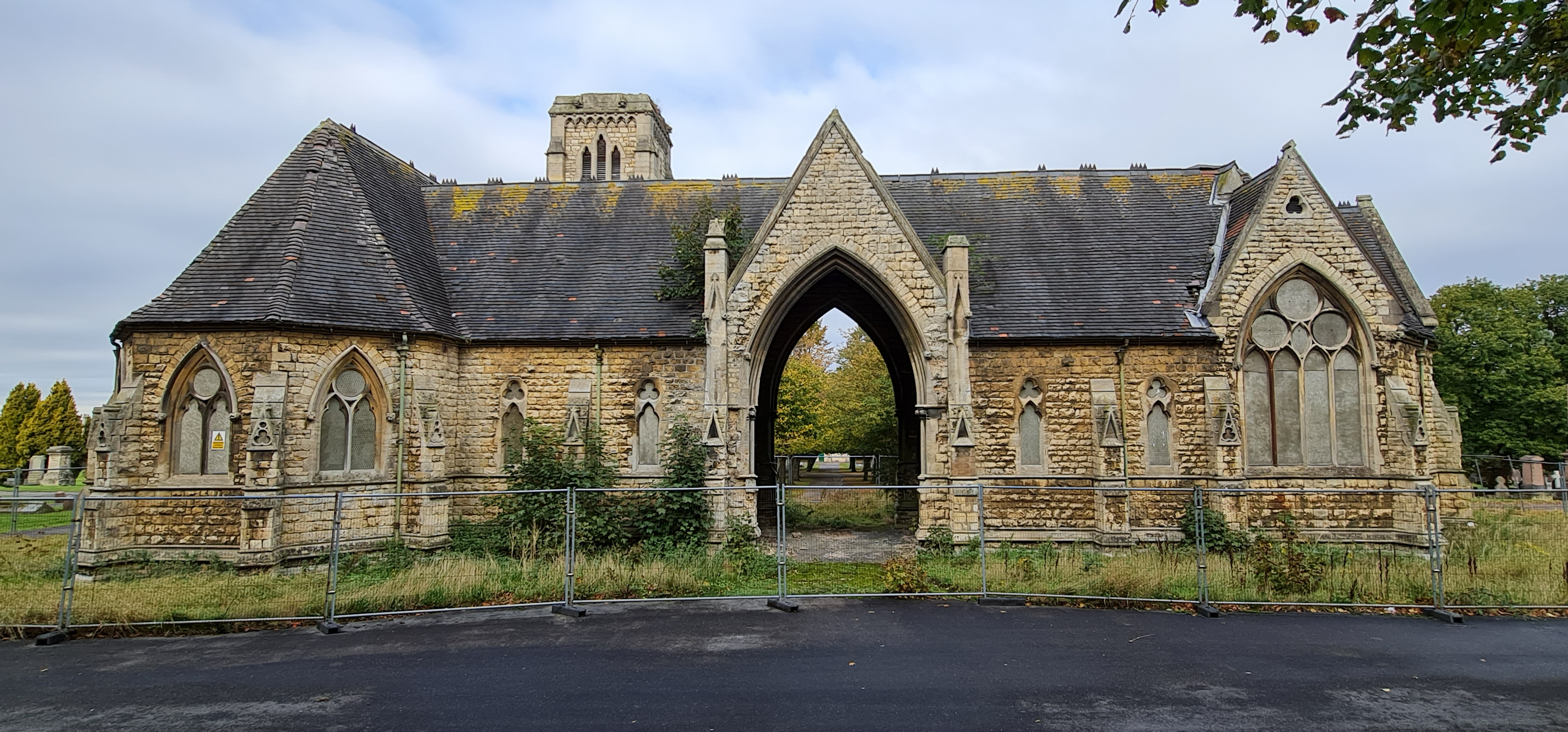
The former chapels

The two chapels were used for holding services and offering a place for visitors to sit and reflect or pray. They fell into disuse following the cemetery reaching its burial limit and became derelict. The Lincoln Crematorium opened in 1968 in the nearby St Swithins Graveyard on Washingborough Road and this is likely when the chapels were closed although no official date has been listed. The chapels were listed at Grade II in 1973. The cemetery still sees occasional burials but all services now take place at nearby churches, chapels or the crematorium.

== War Graves ==
The cemetery contains the war graves of 51 identified British service personnel of both World Wars.
