= Lincolnshire Yeomanry =

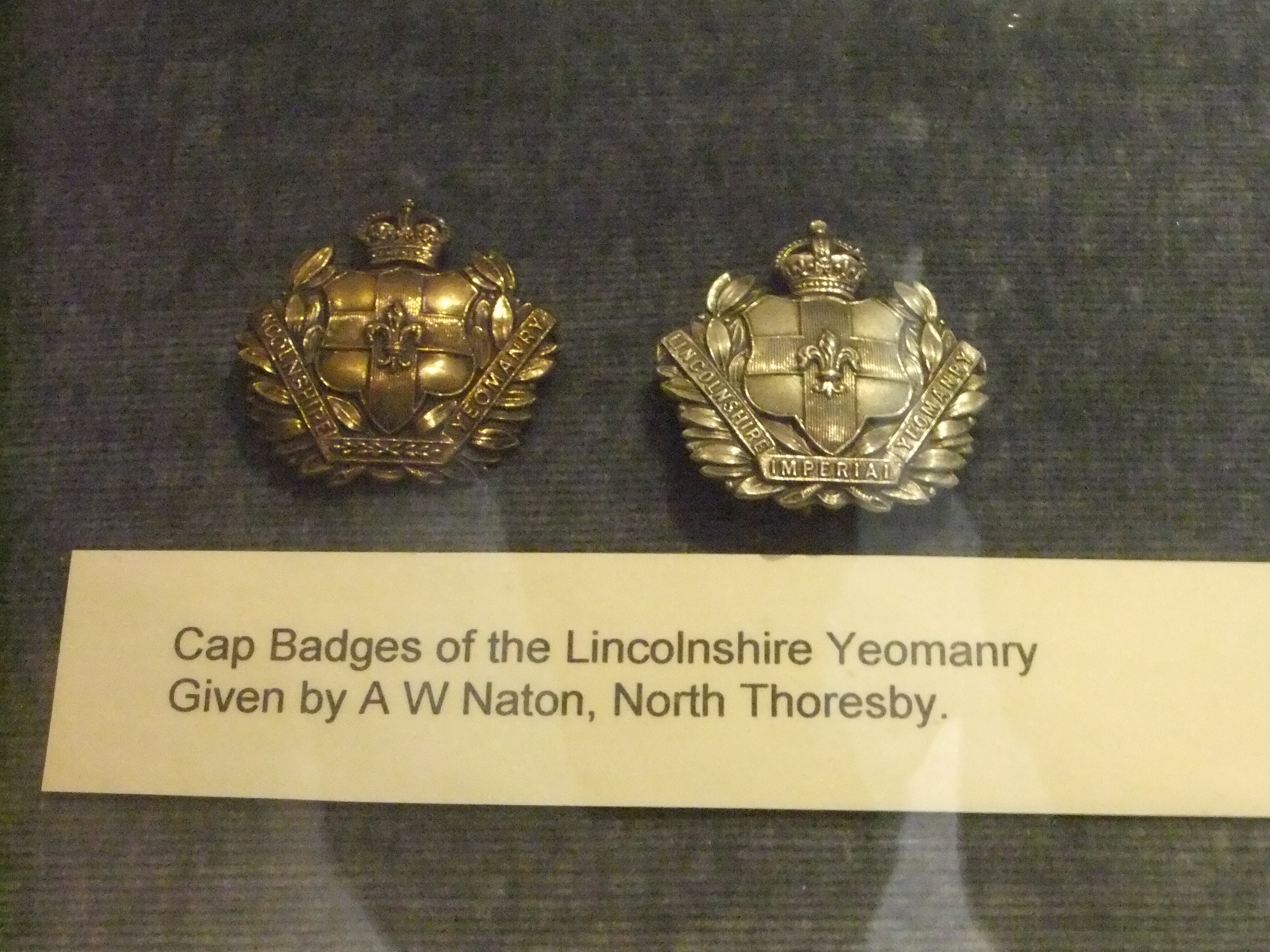
- Badges of the Lincolnshire Imperial Yeomanry, c1900
- Active: 1794–1920
- Country: Kingdom of Great Britain (1794–1800); United Kingdom (1801–Present)
- Branch: British Army
- Type: Yeomanry
- Size: Maximum three Regiments in World War I
- Engagements: South Africa 1900–1902; World War I Second Battle of Gaza; Third Battle of Gaza; Battle of Beersheba

The Lincolnshire Yeomanry was a volunteer cavalry unit of the British Army formed in 1794. It saw action in the Second Boer War and the First World War before being disbanded in 1920.

== History ==
=== Formation and early history ===
In 1793, the prime minister, William Pitt the Younger, proposed that the English Counties form a force of Volunteer Yeoman Cavalry that could be called on by the king to defend the country against invasion or by the Lord Lieutenant to subdue any civil disorder within the country. Various independent troops were raised in Lincolnshire in 1794 but disbanded in 1828. The yeomanry in Lincolnshire was re-raised as the North Lincoln Regiment of Yeomanry Cavalry in 1831 but was disbanded again in 1846.

=== Second Boer War ===
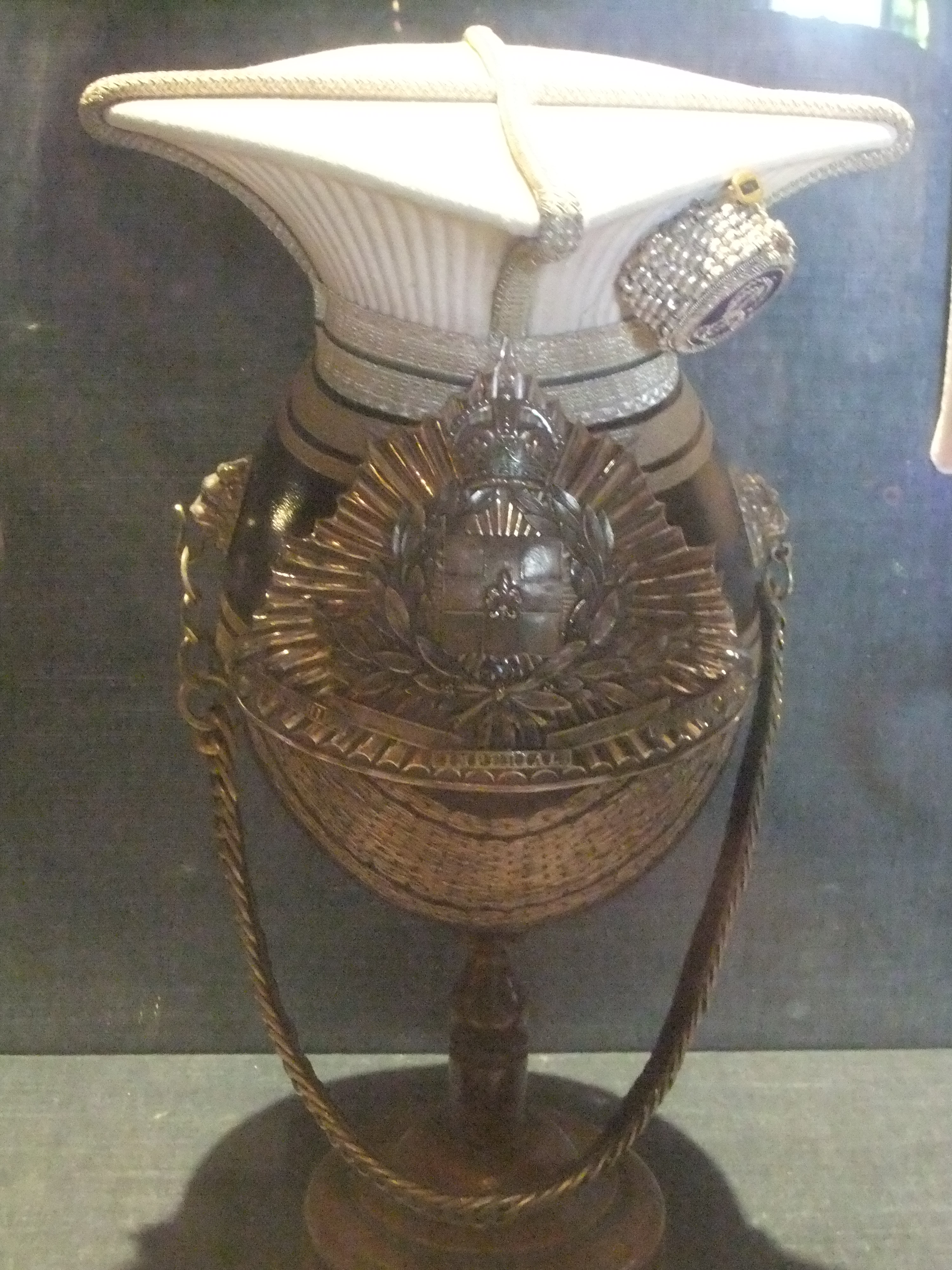
Full dress Czapka, Lincolnshire Imperial Yeomanry, Museum of Lincolnshire Life, Lincoln, England

On 13 December 1899, the decision to allow volunteer forces to serve in the Second Boer War was made. Due to the string of defeats during Black Week in December 1899, the British government realized they were going to need more troops than just the regular army, thus issuing a Royal Warrant on 24 December 1899. This warrant officially created the Imperial Yeomanry. The Royal Warrant asked standing Yeomanry regiments to provide service companies of approximately 115 men each. In addition to this, many British citizens (usually mid-upper class) volunteered to join the new regiment. Although there were strict requirements, many volunteers were accepted with substandard horsemanship/marksmanship; however, they had significant time to train while awaiting transport. The first contingent of recruits contained 550 officers, 10,371 men with 20 battalions and 4 companies, which arrived in South Africa between February and April 1900.

The Mounted infantry experiment was considered a success and the existing Yeomanry regiments at home were converted to Imperial Yeomanry, while new regiments were formed. The Lincolnshire Imperial Yeomanry was formed on 25 June 1901, based at the "old barracks" on Burton Road, Lincoln. When the Yeomanry were transferred to the Territorial Force (TF) in 1908, the word 'Imperial' was dropped from their titles.

=== First World War ===
In accordance with the Territorial and Reserve Forces Act 1907 (7 Edw. 7, c.9), which brought the Territorial Force into being, the TF was intended to be a home defence force for service during wartime and members could not be compelled to serve outside the country. However, on the outbreak of war on 4 August 1914, many members volunteered for Imperial Service. Therefore, TF units were split in August and September 1914 into 1st Line (liable for overseas service) and 2nd Line (home service for those unable or unwilling to serve overseas) units. Later, a 3rd Line was formed to act as a reserve, providing trained replacements for the 1st and 2nd Line regiments.

==== 1/1st Lincolnshire Yeomanry ====
The regiment was mobilised in August 1914, and formed a part of the North Midland Mounted Brigade. In September, it was attached to the 1st Mounted Division.

In 1915, the brigade was ordered overseas and departed for Salonika but en route it received orders to divert to Egypt. In April 1916 the Brigade was re-designated as the 22nd Mounted Brigade and attached to the Western Frontier Force. In early 1917 it moved to the ANZAC Mounted Division and participated in the Second Battle of Gaza. Another move was made in June 1917, this time they were attached to the Yeomanry Mounted Division and were involved in the Third Battle of Gaza and the Battle of Beersheba, later the Division would be re-designated and change their name to the 1st Mounted Division and the 4th Cavalry Division, while with the 4th Cavalry Division the brigade again changed its designation and became the 12th Cavalry Brigade.

In April 1918, the regiment left the brigade and their horses, to become a dismounted unit of the Machine Gun Corps, merging with 1/1st East Riding of Yorkshire Yeomanry to form "D" Battalion, Machine Gun Corps. It was as the 102nd MGC that they moved to France in June 1918 and were attached to the First Army.

==== 2/1st Lincolnshire Yeomanry ====
The 2nd Line regiment was formed in 1914 and in 1915 it joined the 2/1st North Midland Mounted Brigade. In October, the brigade joined the 1st Mounted Division in Norfolk, replacing the 1st Line brigade. On 31 March 1916, the remaining Mounted Brigades were ordered to be numbered in a single sequence and the brigade became the 3rd Mounted Brigade.

In July 1916, there was a major reorganization of 2nd Line yeomanry units in the United Kingdom. All but 12 regiments were converted to cyclists and as a consequence the regiment was dismounted and joined the 3rd Cyclist Brigade (and the division became 1st Cyclist Division) in the Holt area. A further reorganization in November 1916 saw the regiment remounted along with the rest of the brigade which was redesignated as the new 2nd Mounted Brigade in the new 1st Mounted Division (originally 3rd Mounted Division) at Bishop's Stortford. By May 1917 it was at Leybourne near West Malling in Kent. The regiment was once again converted to cyclists in August 1917 and joined 12th Cyclist Brigade in The Cyclist Division. By the end of 1917, it was at Tonbridge and early in 1918 to Canterbury where it remained until the end of the war.

==== 3/1st Lincolnshire Yeomanry ====
The 3rd Line regiment was formed in 1915 and in the summer was affiliated to a Reserve Cavalry Regiment at Aldershot. In the summer of 1916, it was attached to the 12th Reserve Cavalry Regiment, also at Aldershot. Early in 1917 it was absorbed into the 1st Reserve Cavalry Regiment at The Curragh.

=== Post war ===
On reforming the Territorial Army after the war, the 14 senior Yeomanry Regiments would remain as horsed cavalry regiments (forming the 5th and 6th Cavalry Brigades). Other Yeomanry Regiments were converted into Royal Artillery Regiments. The Lincolnshire Yeomanry decided they did not want to convert to artillery so the regiment was disbanded in 1920.

== Regimental museum ==
The Royal Lincolnshire Regiment and Lincolnshire Yeomanry collections are displayed in Lincoln's Museum of Lincolnshire Life.

== Uniforms ==
During its comparatively short history (1901–1920), the Lincolnshire Yeomanry was noted for the Lincoln green of its uniforms - a lighter shade than the sombre rifle green widely worn in the British Army. The original uniform of the regiment was the newly introduced khaki serge but with collars, shoulder-straps, and cuff-piping in Lincoln-green. For reasons of recruitment and morale this relatively plain dress was eventually replaced with an elaborate lancer style full dress (including white plastron fronts and plumed czapka caps) for the officers. Other ranks wore Lincoln-green "frock" tunics with peaked caps, shoulder chains and double white stripes on their overalls (cavalry trousers strapped under the boots). From about 1908 to 1920 the standard khaki service dress of British mounted troops was worn for training and ordinary duties.

== See also ==
- Imperial Yeomanry
- List of Yeomanry Regiments 1908
- Yeomanry
- Yeomanry order of precedence
- British yeomanry during the First World War
- Second line yeomanry regiments of the British Army

== Bibliography ==
- Becke, Archibald F. (1936). Order of Battle of Divisions Part 2A. The Territorial Force Mounted Divisions and the 1st-Line Territorial Force Divisions (42–56). London: HMSO. OCLC 4405016.
- James, Brigadier E.A. (1978). British Regiments 1914–18. London: Samson Books Limited. ISBN 0-906304-03-2.
- Mileham, Patrick (1994). The Yeomanry Regiments; 200 Years of Tradition. Edinburgh: Canongate Academic. ISBN 1-898410-36-4.
- Rinaldi, Richard A (2008). Order of Battle of the British Army 1914. Ravi Rikhye. ISBN 978-0-97760728-0.
