= John Cooper (Islamic studies scholar) =

American scholar of Islam

- Born: 1947; Brighton
- Died: 1998 (aged 50–51) outside Reims in northern France
- Scientific career
- Fields: Islamic Studies
- Workplaces: University of Cambridge
- Thesis: Intellect and Language: A Case Study of the Philosophical Foundations of Shii Legal Methodology
- Doctoral advisor: Wilferd Ferdinand Madelung

John (Yahya) Cooper (24 August 1947 – 9 January 1998) was a British Islamic studies scholar and the E. G. Browne lecturer in Persian at the Faculty of Oriental Studies at the University of Cambridge.

== Works ==
- A Manual of Islamic beliefs and practice
- Islam and modernity: Muslim intellectuals respond
- Jāmiʻ al-bayān ʻan taʼwīl āy al-Qurʼān
- La vie berbère par les textes : parlors du sud-ouest marocain (tachelhit)
- The significance of Islamic manuscripts : proceedings of the inaugural conference of al-Furqān Islamic Heritage Foundation
- Ṭabarī. The commentary on the Qurʼān
- Universal science : an introduction to Islamic metaphysics
