= Joseph Ruston =

English engineer, manufacturer and Liberal politician

Joseph Ruston (1835 – 11 June 1897) was an English engineer and manufacturer and Liberal Party politician, though he split from the party over Home Rule and retired.

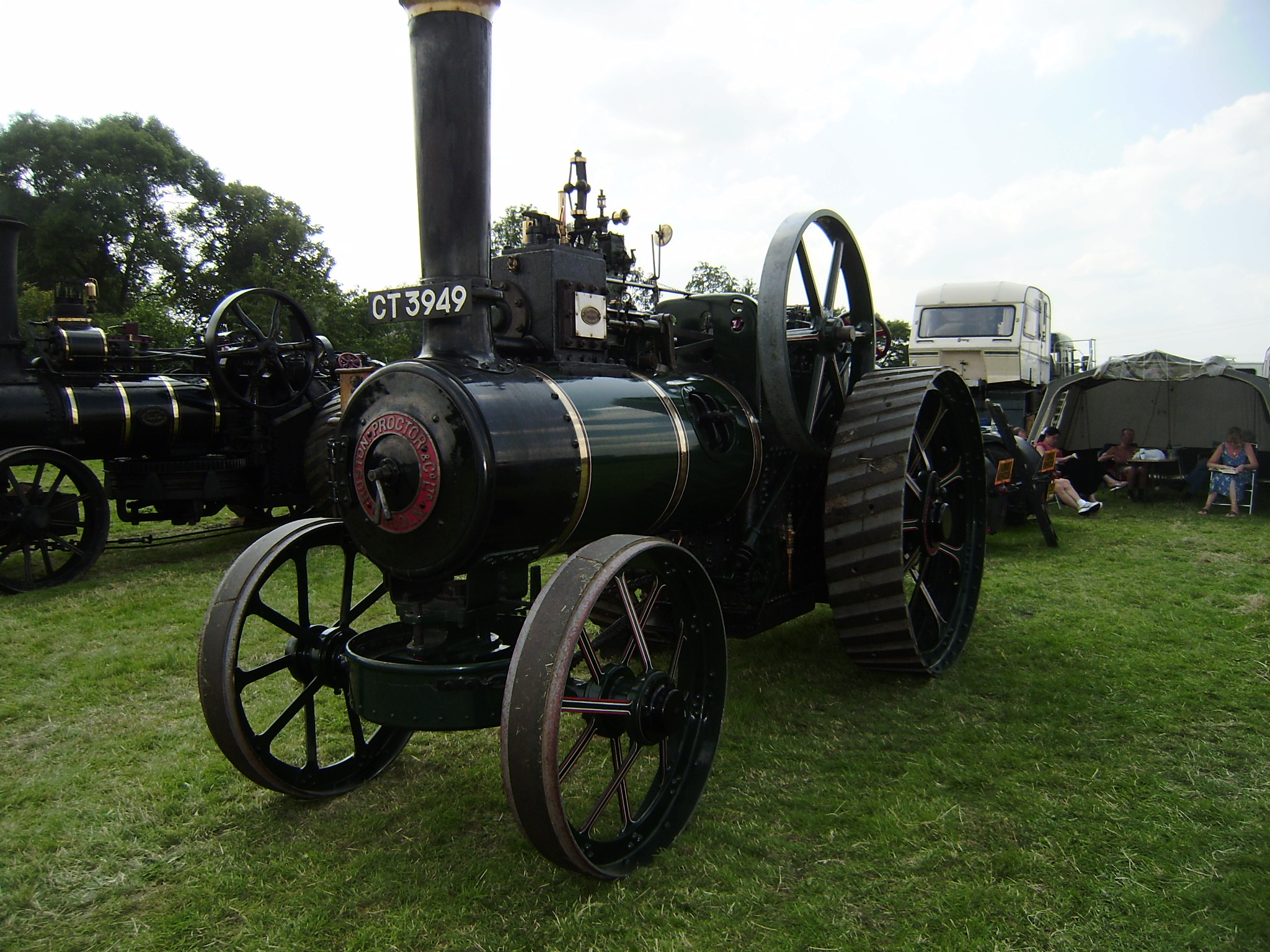
Ruston, Proctor and Co. traction engine

Ruston was the son of Robert Ruston a farmer of Chatteris, Isle of Ely and his wife Margaret Seward. He was educated at Wesley College, Sheffield and became an apprentice at the Sheffield cutlery firm of George Wostenholme. On completing his apprenticeship in 1856 with a good commercial training and having a modest inheritance from his father's estate he went into business with Burton and Proctor of Lincoln. He thus became head of the firm of Ruston, Proctor and Company, agricultural implement makers and engineers. The company grew in size until it employed some 2000 people and in its lifetime produced 20,800 engines, 19,700 boilers, 10,900 threshing machines, and 1350 corn mills.

Ruston was a J.P. and was elected Mayor of Lincoln for 1869–70. He was elected as a Liberal Member of Parliament (MP) for Lincoln in a by-election in June 1884. He was re-elected at the 1885 general election but did not stand again in 1886 because he disapproved of Gladstone's proposals for Home Rule.

His decorations included the Cross of the Legion of Honour and the Order of Osmanieh. He was appointed High Sheriff of Lincolnshire in 1891. He was a benefactor to the town of Lincoln, funding the building of the drill hall for the local volunteers, a children's ward at the Lincoln County Hospital, and the restoration of the monument in Lincoln Cathedral to the memory of Queen Eleanor.

== Family ==
Ruston married Jane Brown in 1859, and lived at Monks Manor. They had a son William and six daughters. Their third daughter Marion Ruston married in 1900 George John Bennett, organist at Lincoln Cathedral.

Parliament of the United Kingdom
Preceded by Charles Seely; John Hinde Palmer	Member of Parliament for Lincoln; 1884–1886; With: Charles Seely until 1885	Succeeded by Frederick Harold Kerans
