= Eccleshill, Lancashire =

Civil parish in Lancashire, England

Coordinates: 53.708°N 2.443°W

Eccleshill
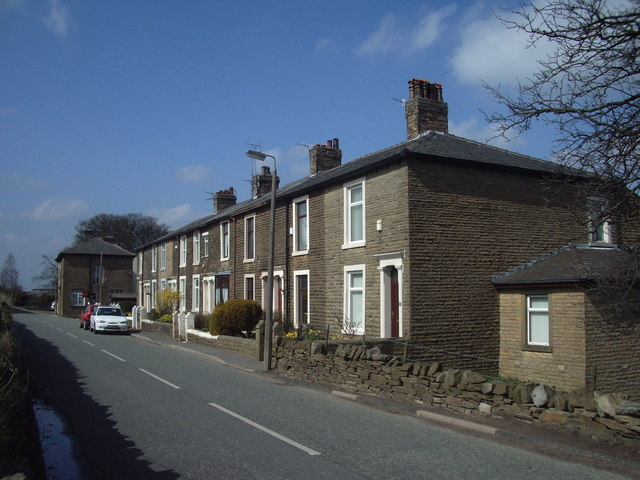
- Leonard Terrace, Waterside (April 2006)

- Shown within Blackburn with Darwen Location within Lancashire
- Population: 319 (2011 Census)
- OS grid reference: SD707236
- Civil parish: Eccleshill
- Unitary authority: Blackburn with Darwen
- Ceremonial county: Lancashire
- Region: North West
- Country: England
- Sovereign state: United Kingdom
- Post town: DARWEN
- Postcode district: BB3
- Dialling code: 01254
- Police: Lancashire
- Fire: Lancashire
- Ambulance: North West
- UK Parliament: Rossendale and Darwen

Eccleshill is a civil parish in the Borough of Blackburn with Darwen, Lancashire, England. The population of the parish was only 319, at the census of 2011. It contains the hamlets of Eccleshill, Grimshaw and Waterside. Located within the parish is Shaws of Darwen, who manufacture goods such as sinks and architectural terracotta.

The factory situated in Waterside opened in 1908, and in the 1920s, the company was the largest employer in Darwen.

The Lancashire and Yorkshire Railway's Hoddlesden Branch Line, the goods line opened in 1876 passed through the parish. It was built to provide one service to Hoddlesden, south of Eccleshill, and although the passenger service was proposed, the application was not successful. The goods station at Hoddlesden closed in 1950, but the line remained open to Waterside to serve Shaws of Darwen until 1962.

== See also ==
- Listed buildings in Eccleshill, Lancashire
