= John Langwith =

John Langwith may refer to:

- John Langwith Sr., English carpenter and architect
- John Langwith Jr., his son, English architect and builder
