= Michael Drury =

English architect

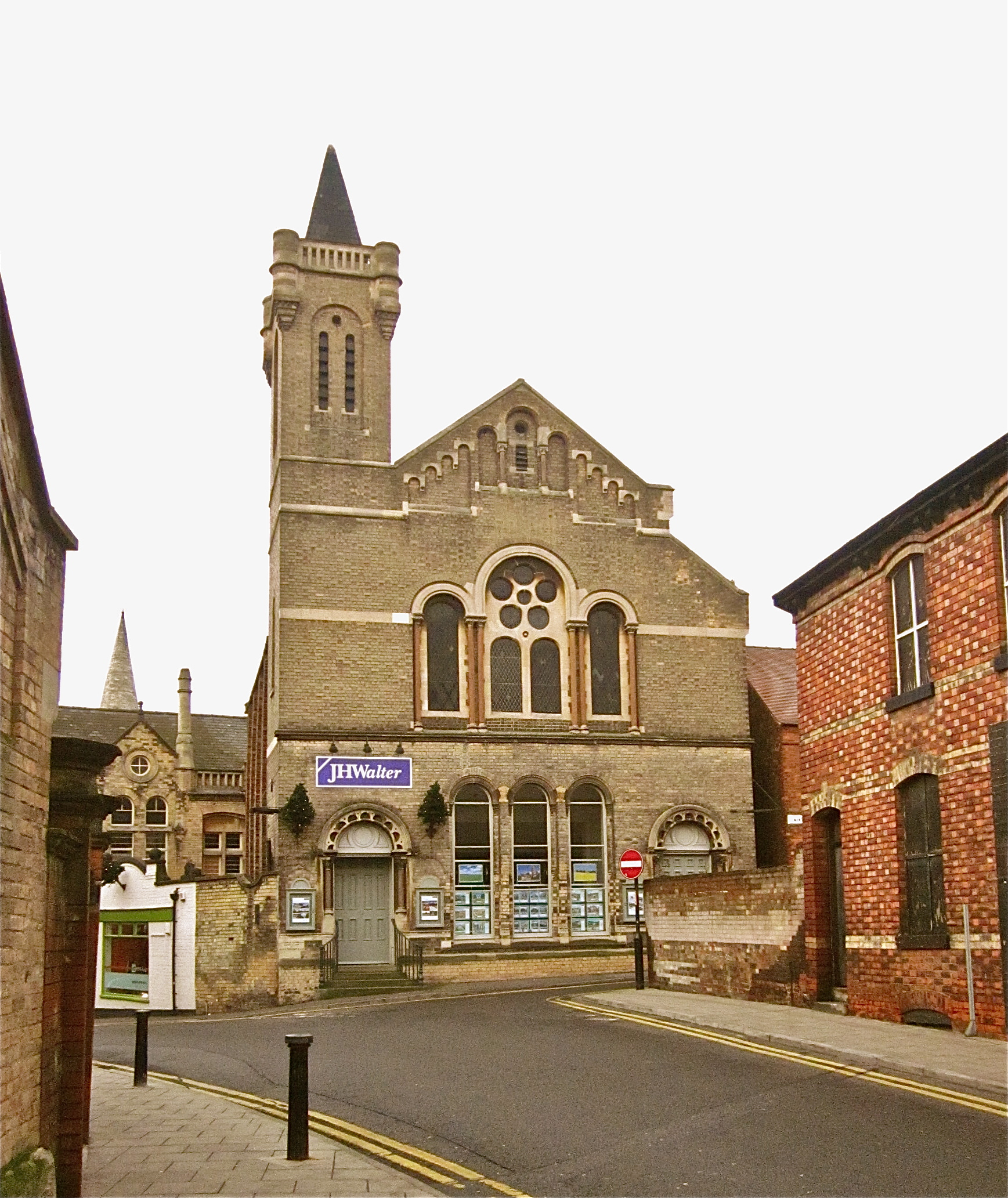
- Mint Street Baptist Church, Lincoln, 1870
- Born: 28 July 1832; Lincoln.
- Died: 6 February 1890 (aged 57); Lincoln
- Education: Pupil of William Adams Nicholson,
- Occupation: Architect
- Practice: In Lincoln from 1853 -c1885, later Drury and Mortimer.

Michael Drury (1832 – after 1881) was an English architect working in Lincoln.

== Life ==
Michael Drury was born about 1832 in Lincoln. He was apprenticed to the Lincoln architect William Adams Nicholson and appears to have continued his practice, working from No 1, Bank Street (on corner with Silver Street) in Lincoln. He became Lincoln City Surveyor and 1868 was called upon by the City Council to give evidence about the state of the drains in the city, which were giving rise to much ill health. Later in 1878 he was responsible for the new drainage and sewerage scheme for Lincoln and kept extensive notes on the many Roman discoveries that were made in the Bailgate and along the High Street in Lincoln. In 1863 he was the Curator and sub-treasurer of the Lincolnshire Architectural and Archaeological Society. In 1881 he was living at Foss Lodge, Lincoln. Drury specialised in church restoration work. The architect Albert Vicars, who specialised in church architecture served his articles with Michael Drury. Around 1870 Drury joined William Mortimer in a partnership which lasted until about 1878. After this he worked by himself mainly laying out new streets and building terrace housing until 1889.

== Works ==
=== Church Buildings and Chapels. ===
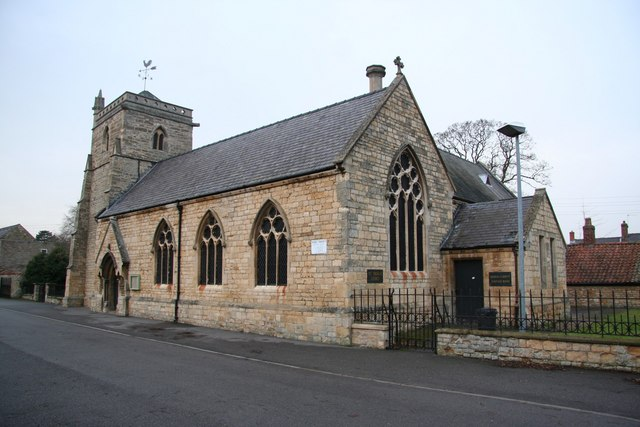
St. Thomas' church with Drury's school conversion attached- now Heighington Heritage Centre.

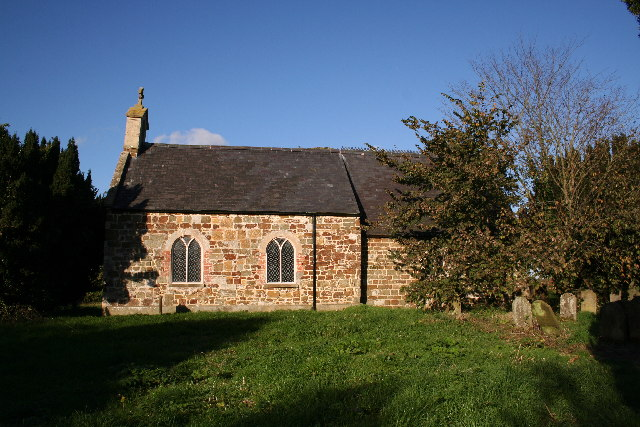
St. Peter's church, Sotby, Lincolnshire

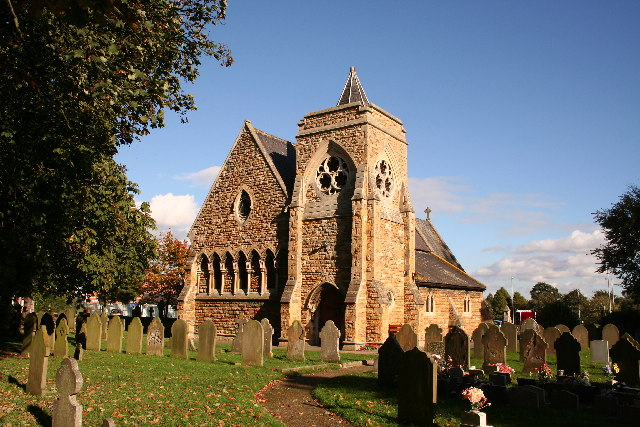
All Saints' church, North Hykeham, Lincs.

- Heighington, Lincolnshire. 1865. Conversion of an earlier church building into a village school.
- Boultham, Lincoln. Restoration of St Helen's Church.
- North Hykeham, Lincs. Restoration of All Saints' church, North Hykeham, 1858 Neo-gothic in the 13th century style,
- Reepham, Lincolnshire, Reepham 1862.
- Sotby. Lincolnshire Built a new nave to the church in 1857 in the Early English style.

=== Cemeteries ===
- Spalding Cemetery, Pinchbeck Road.(1854). Nicholson and Drury submitted plans in June 1854 for this cemetery. As Nicholson had died the previous year it would appear that Michael Drury was architect for the cemetery. Anglican and Dissenting chapels constructed of red brick, with stone dressings, in Gothic style.
- Lincoln Cemetery, Canwick Road. The Anglican and Methodist/Dissenting Chapels at the Lincoln cemetery. (1856). A pair of chapels linked with an arch, gothic with geometrical tracery. One chapel is octagonal and the other has a squat tower with chamfered buttresses, blind arcade above and a recessed bell stage with trefoiled corbel table and an apse

=== Vicarage ===
- Newton on Trent, Lincolnshire. 1864. Red brick gothic Vicarage

== Drury and Mortimer ==
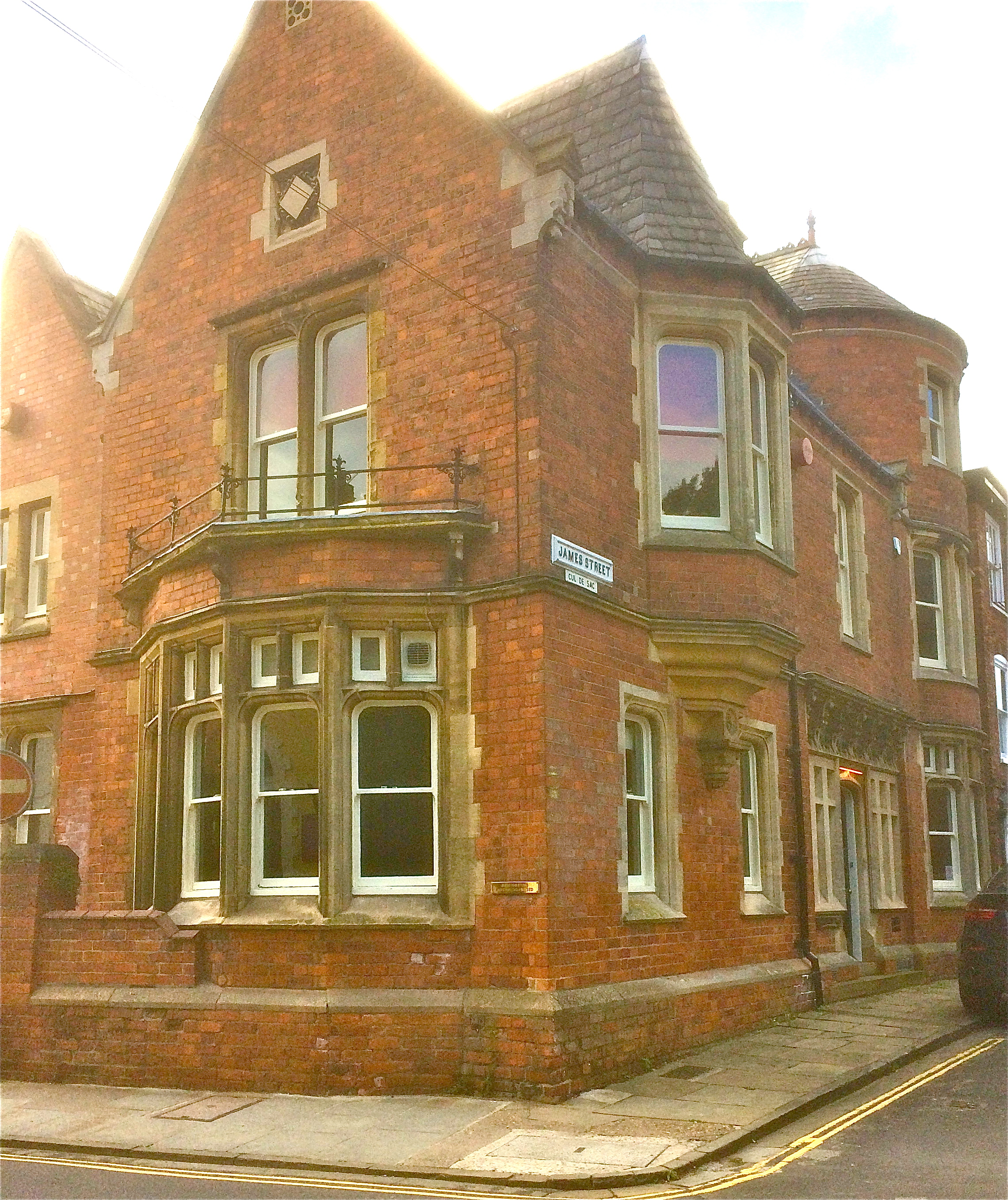
1 James Street Lincoln 01

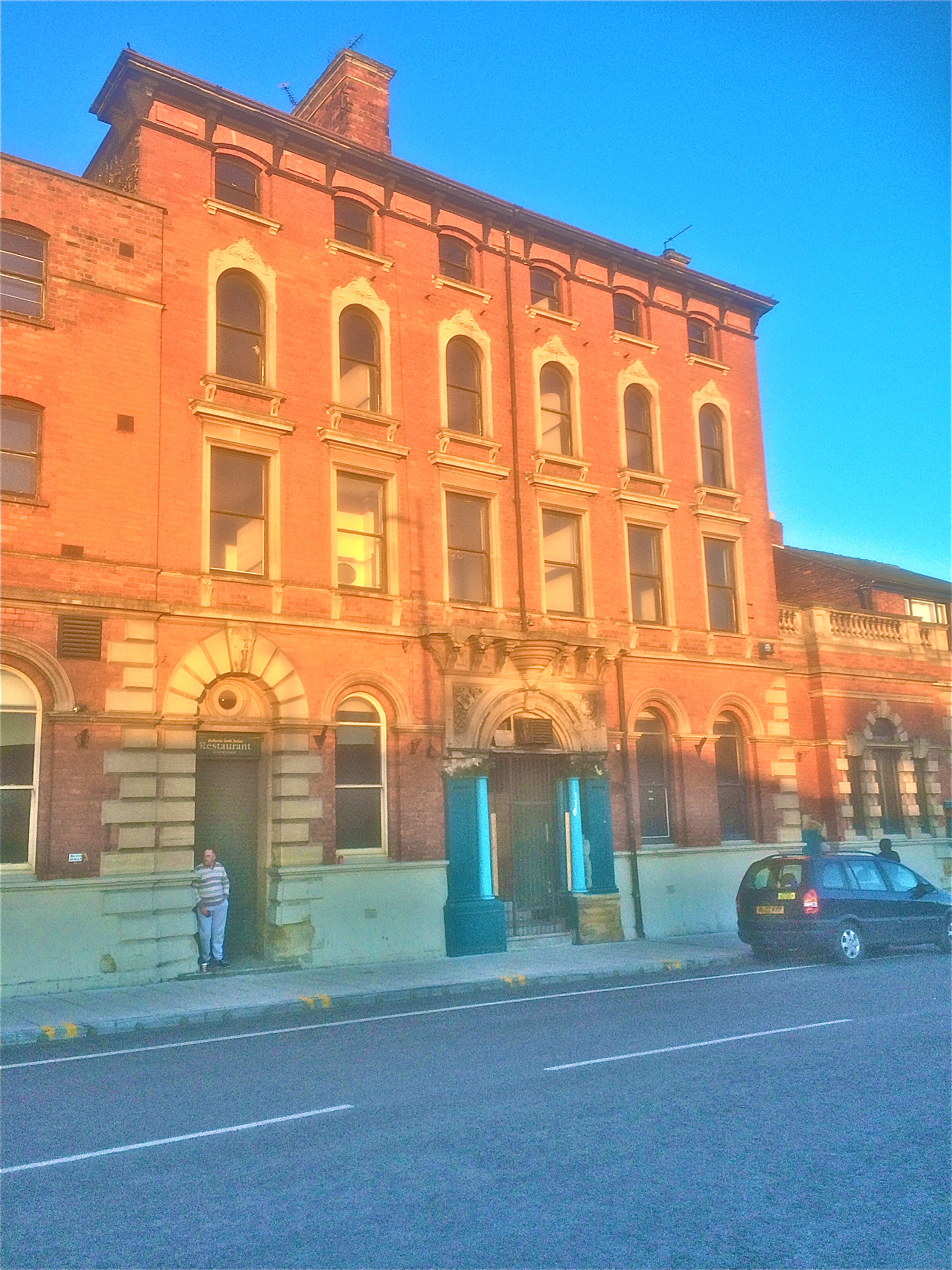
Barbican Hotel Lincoln

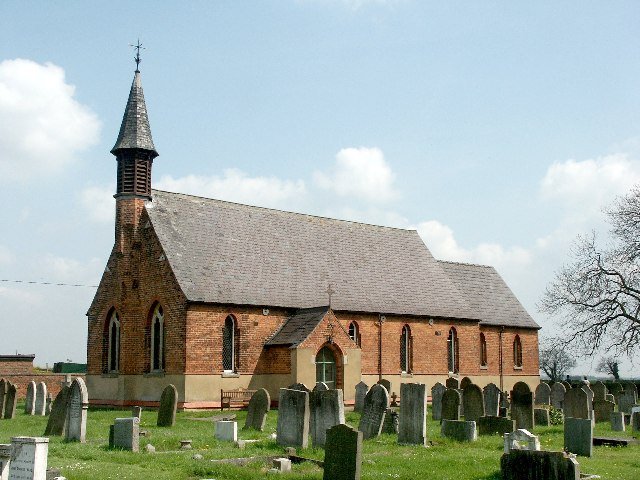
St Luke, North Kyme - Drury and Mortimer 1877

- The Albion Hotel,(1867), later the Barbican, St Mary's Street, Lincoln. Originally built as a Gentlemans' Club. Brick facade with two wings, ornate doorway, rustication and Venetian window to the clubroom which originally contained a Moorish smoking room.
- Mint St Baptist chapel, Lincoln (1870). Now converted into the offices of Walters Estate agents. An example of Romanesque Revival architecture in a debased Italianate Romanesque revival style in 1870.
- 1 James Street, Lincoln (1874). Tudoresque with ornate doorway with decorative tiles. Built for Mrs Nicholson, the widow of the architect William Adams Nicholson.
- The Mount, Spring Hill/Drury Lane, Lincoln. (1875) A Villa, set in the moat of Lincoln Castle.
- St Luke's church. North Kyme. Red brick church built in 1877.
- Restoration of church. South Hykeham.
- Villa Firenza, 95 Monks Road, Lincoln. 1876. Designed for the artificial stone and terracotta manufacturer Joseph Fambrini. Red brick with artificial stone and terracotta decoration.
- 2-4 The Avenue. Drury and Mortimer. 1878.

== Literature ==
- Antram N (revised), Pevsner, N. & Harris J, (1989), The Buildings of England: Lincolnshire, Yale University Press.
- Antonia Brodie (ed), Directory of British Architects, 1834–1914: 2 Vols, British Architectural Library, Royal Institute of British Architects, 2001, Vol 2, pg. 565.
- Jones M (2011), Inexhaustable Themes for Study and Speculation, Michael Drury and the recording of Lincoln's buried archaeology, in Lincoln Connections:Aspects of City and County since 1700, Ed Brook S. et al., Society for Lincolnshire History and Archaeology. ISBN 9780903582421.
