= John Langwith Jr. =

English architect and builder (c.1753–1825)

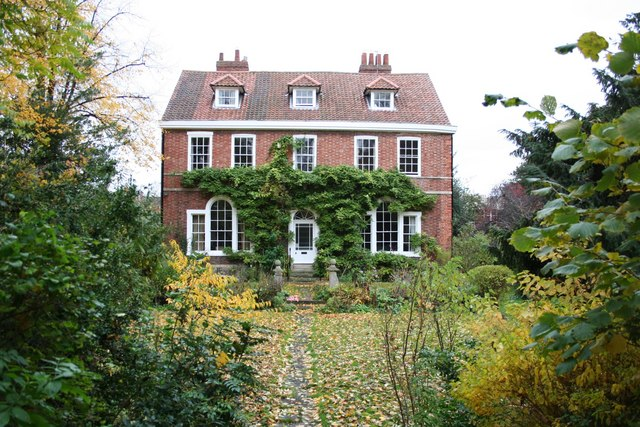
- St.Wulfram's Vicarage, Grantham by John Langwith.
- Born: c. 1753; Grantham, Lincolnshire
- Died: 1825; Grantham, Lincolnshire
- Occupation: Architect
- Buildings: Grantham Vicarage and Barkston Rectory

John Langwith Jr. (c. 1753–1825) was an English architect and builder who worked in Grantham, Lincolnshire. He was the son of John Langwith Sr. (c. 1723–1795) and the architectural practice was continued in Grantham by his son Joseph Silvester Langwith (1787–1854). John Langwith Junior was declared bankrupt in February 1795 but paid the debt off in dividends and was discharged. By 1820, he is described as Gentleman and served as Mayor and Alderman of Grantham.

== Work by John Langwith ==
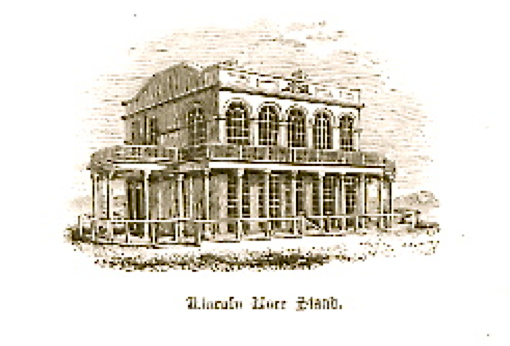
Lincoln Racestand

- Grantham Vicarage, Church Street. 1789, which he rebuilt.
- Barkston Rectory, Lincolnshire. 1801.
- In 181 he prepared plans for a Prison at Grantham, but it is not clear if it was built.
- Lincoln Race Stand c.1818. Langwith was the architect and contractor for the Race Stand. This was replaced by the existing Race Stand of 1897 by William Mortimer

== Literature ==
- Antram N (revised), Pevsner N & Harris J, (1989), The Buildings of England: Lincolnshire, Yale University Press.
- Colvin H. A (1995), Biographical Dictionary of British Architects 1600-1840. Yale University Press, 3rd edition London, pg.599.
- Worsley G.(1987). Georgian Buildings in Grantham , Country Life, 4th. June.
