= Lincoln Racecourse =

Horse racing venue in Lincoln, England

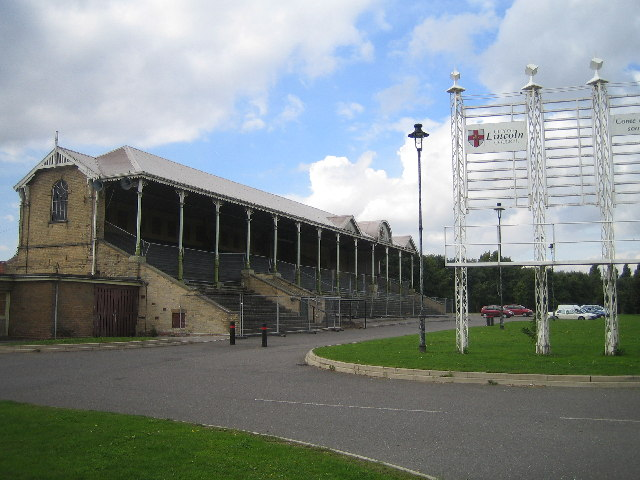
- Lincoln Racecourse grandstand
- Interactive map of Lincoln Racecourse
- Location: Lincoln, England
- Coordinates: 53.235°N 0.564°W
- Owned by: Jockey Club Racecourses
- Course type: Flat
- Notable races: Lincoln Handicap

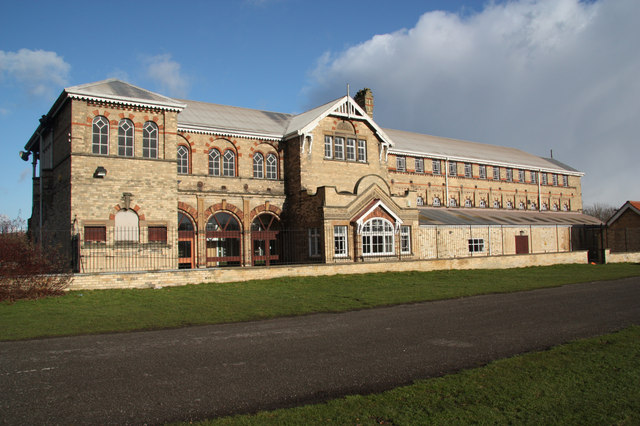
The grandstand from the rear

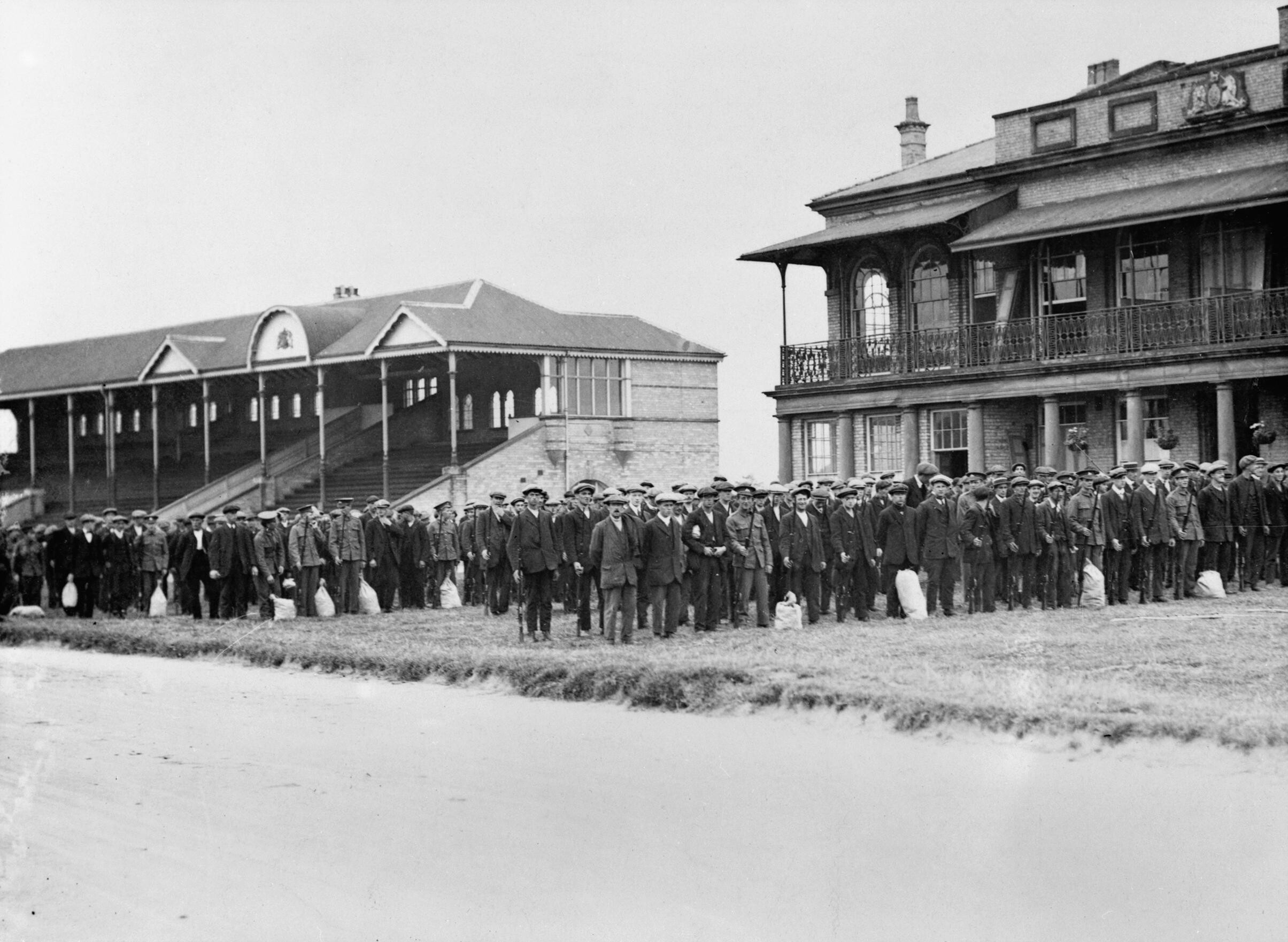
Recruits to the Lincolnshire Regiment parade in September 1914

Lincoln Racecourse is a former horse racing venue to the west of the city of Lincoln, at Carholme, a flat tract of common land in Lincolnshire, England. It was the original location of the Lincolnshire Handicap. The course closed in 1964, and the following year the race relocated to Doncaster Racecourse where a small change to the race title sees it run as the Lincoln Handicap.

The track's history was long and significant. James I himself acted as clerk of the course in 1607. He is recorded as requesting that a 450 yards long stretch of the course be "raled and corded with ropes and hoopes" on both sides, so that the horses "that ronned were seen fayre."

The Flat racing season usually opened with the three-day Spring meeting in March, with the Lincolnshire Handicap on the third day. This race was probably run for the first time on 10 August 1849, over a distance of two miles, and won by a filly, Media, owned by Brownlow Cecil, 2nd Marquess of Exeter. Media won another race later in the day. The distance of the Lincoln was reduced to one mile on the straight course in 1864 or 1865. John Rickman describes the Lincoln mile as "easy", as it was slightly downhill for the first two furlongs, with a very-slight left-handed elbow before half way. This gave horses drawn with low numbers a disadvantage.

The course was a left-handed oval of about one mile, five furlongs, with a home straight of about half a mile.

From 1727 at the earliest, Lincoln had held a Royal Plate race, run in 4 mile heats by 6 year olds carrying 12 stone.

The course was located west of the City of Lincoln by Saxilby Road. The racecourse was established by the Lincoln Corporation on West Common in 1773. The grandstand of 1897 by William Mortimer is a Grade II listed building, now used as a community centre. The A57 road passed between the course and the grandstand. During race meetings, this was closed off and traffic diverted, enabling BBC cameras to follow the leaders of the race at close distance all the way from start to the winning post.

After closure the course was used for many years as a point-to-point track.

== Bibliography ==
- Cawthorne, George James; Herod, Richard S. (1902). Royal Ascot, Its History & Its Associations (PDF). London: A Treherne & Co.
