= Cast stone =

Material simulating natural stone

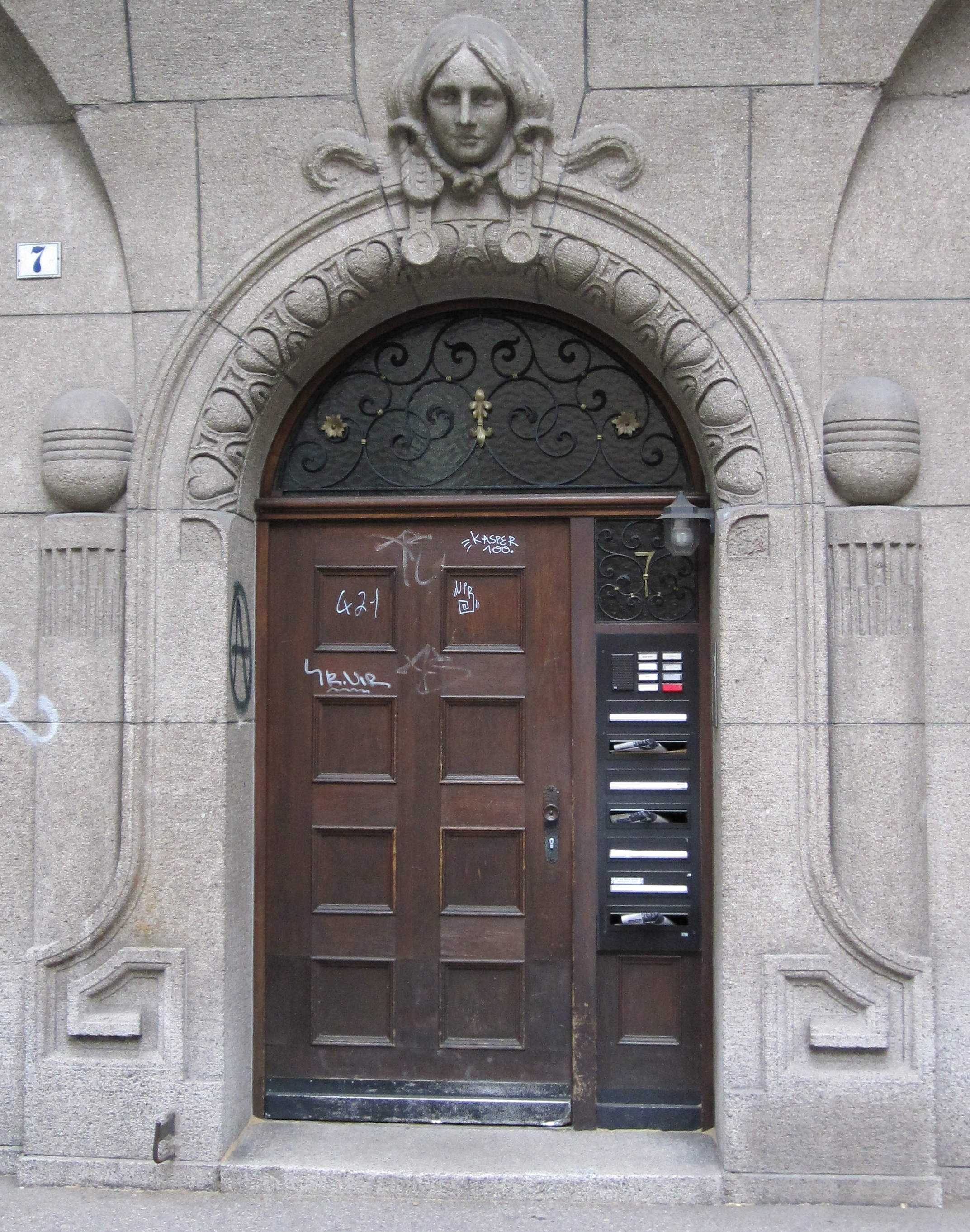
Doorway in cast stone, Freiburg, Germany

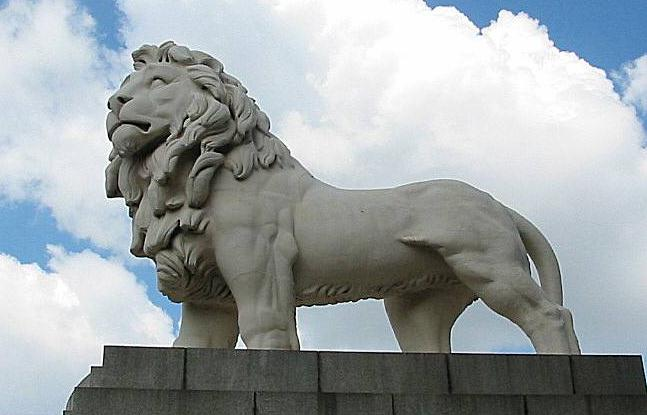
The Coade stone South Bank Lion at the south end of Westminster Bridge, London

Cast stone or reconstructed stone is a refined artificial stone, a form of precast concrete. It is used as a building material to simulate natural-cut masonry in architectural features such as facings and trim; for statuary; and for garden ornaments. It may replace natural building stones including limestone, brownstone, sandstone, bluestone, granite, slate, and travertine. Cast stone can be made from white or grey cements, manufactured or natural sands, crushed stone or natural gravels, and can be coloured with mineral colouring pigments. It is cheaper and more uniform than natural stone, and allows transporting the bulk materials and casting near the place of use, which is cheaper than transporting and carving very large pieces of stone.

== History ==
The earliest known use of cast stone was in the Cité de Carcassonne, France, in about 1138. It was first used extensively in London in the late 19th century and gained widespread acceptance in America in the 1920s.

One of the earliest developments in the industry was Coade stone, a fired ceramic form of stoneware. Another well-known variety was Victoria stone, which is composed of three parts finely crushed Mount Sorrel (Leicestershire) granite to one of Portland cement, carefully mechanically mixed and poured into moulds. After setting the blocks are placed in a solution of silicate of soda to indurate and harden them. Many manufacturers turned out a very non-porous product able to resist corrosive sea air and industrial and residential air pollution.

According to Rupert Gunnis a Dutchman named Van Spangen set up an artificial stone manufactury at Bow in London in 1800 and later went into partnership with a Mr. Powell. The firm was broken up in 1828, and the moulds sold to a sculptor, Felix Austin.

== Manufacturing ==
Today most artificial stone consists of fine Portland cement-based concrete, placed to set in wooden, rubber-lined fiberglass or iron moulds. There are two common manufacturing methods, the dry tamp method and the wet cast process. In the dry tamp method, used for smaller pieces, zero-slump concrete is compacted in the mould by vibration; in the wet cast method, used for larger building elements including those with internal reinforcement or anchor fixings, wetter concrete is cast in the mould for 24 hours. Moulds may be made of sand, wood, plaster, gelatin, rubber-lined fiberglass, or iron; in the dry tamp method, they can be re-used.

== Standards ==
In the US and some other countries, the industry standard for physical properties and raw materials constituents is ASTM C 1364, the Standard Specification for Architectural Cast Stone.

In the UK and Europe, the usual standard is BS 1217: Cast stone - Specification. Under the European Commission's "Construction Products Regulations" legislation, CE marking became mandatory in mid-2013 for certain construction products sold in Europe, including some cast stone items.

== See also ==
- Geopolymers
- Anthropic rock
- Engineered stone
- Fambrini & Daniels Cast stone manufacturers.
