= Listed buildings in Eccleshill, Lancashire =

Eccleshill is a civil parish in Blackburn with Darwen, Lancashire, England. It contains two buildings that are recorded in the National Heritage List for England as designated listed buildings, all of which are listed at Grade II. This grade is the lowest of the three gradings given to listed buildings and is applied to "buildings of national importance and special interest". The parish is rural, and the listed buildings both originated as farmhouses.

== Buildings ==
Name and location	Photograph	Date	Notes
Davy Field Farmhouse; 53.71242°N 2.45410°W	—	17th century (probable)	A whitewashed sandstone farmhouse with a stone-slate roof, in two storeys with a two-bay front. On the front is a projecting two-storey porch with a Tudor arched doorway and an inscribed lintel. The ground floor windows to the left of the porch are mullioned, and the others are casements. At the rear is a single-story outshut.
Manor House Farm Cottage; 53.70810°N 2.45611°W		17th century	A former farmhouse in rendered and painted stone with a slate roof. It has two storeys, an approximately cruciform plan, and a three-bay front. On the front is a projecting two-storey projection, on the left side is a single-storey extension, and at the rear is an outshut. The windows on the front are mullioned. On the right side there are two gables and the windows are sashes.
