= Shaws of Darwen =

Shaws of Darwen is the common trading name of a manufacturer of fire clay sinks and general terracotta products. Founded by Arthur Gerard Shaw in 1897, he began manufacturing the rich clay deposits found at his father’s coal mines in Lancashire, UK.

The company flourished until the outbreak of World War I in 1914. To maintain the business during wartime, acidware and ceramic conductors were manufactured for the government. During this time, Arthur Gerald Shaw patented the gas-fired clayware kiln.

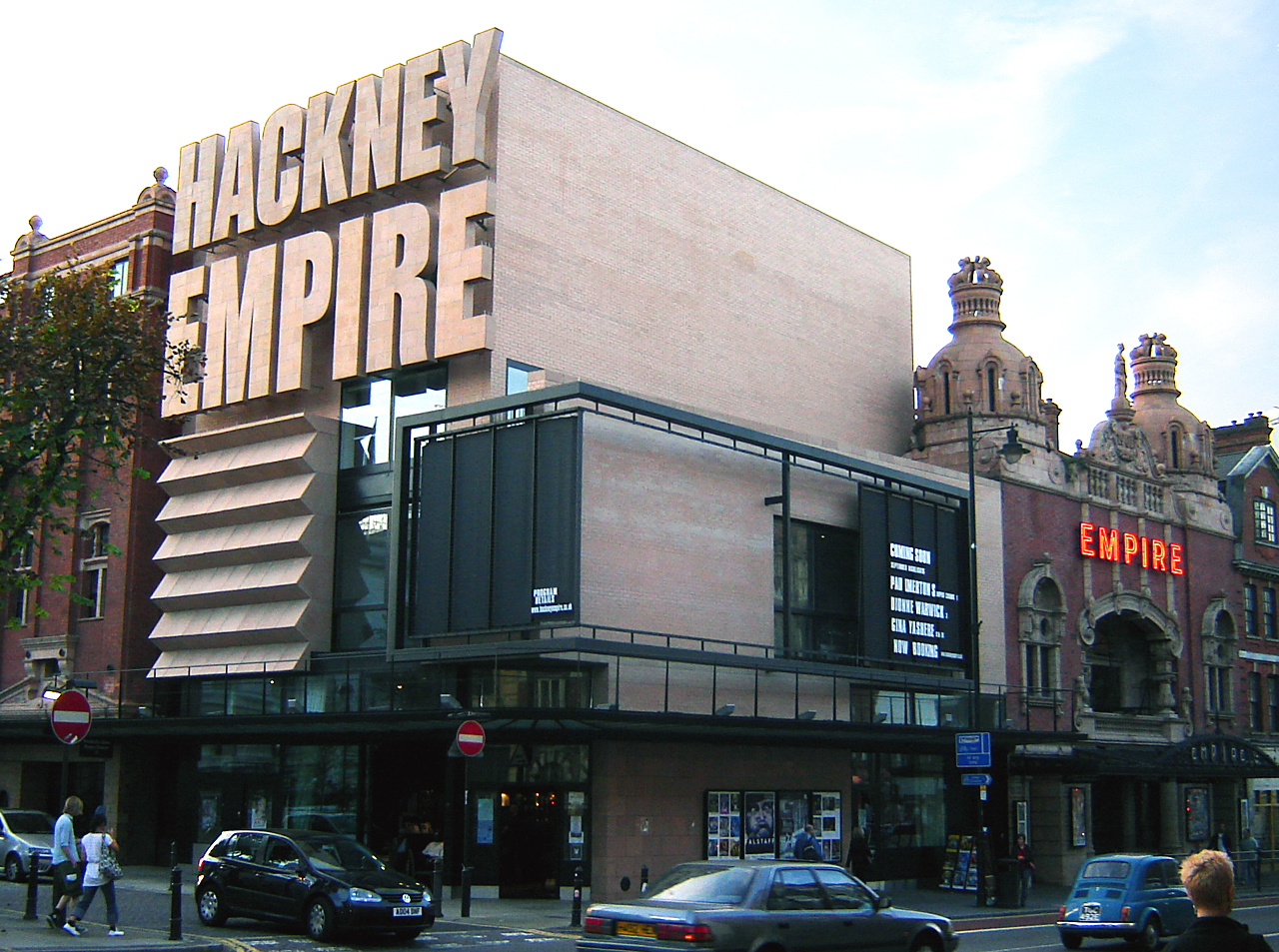
The refurbished Hackney Empire built in 1901; new sign added by Shaws (September 2005)

In 1919, the Shaws Gas Kiln Company formed, making and installing kilns in Great Britain, Europe and America.

Apart from creating the standard Belfast sink, Shaws also are involved in architectural terracotta - having created the Hackney Empire sign and working on the exterior terracotta structure of buildings such as Harrods in the UK and the Wrigley Building in Chicago, United States.
