= William Mortimer (architect) =

English architect (1841/42–1913)

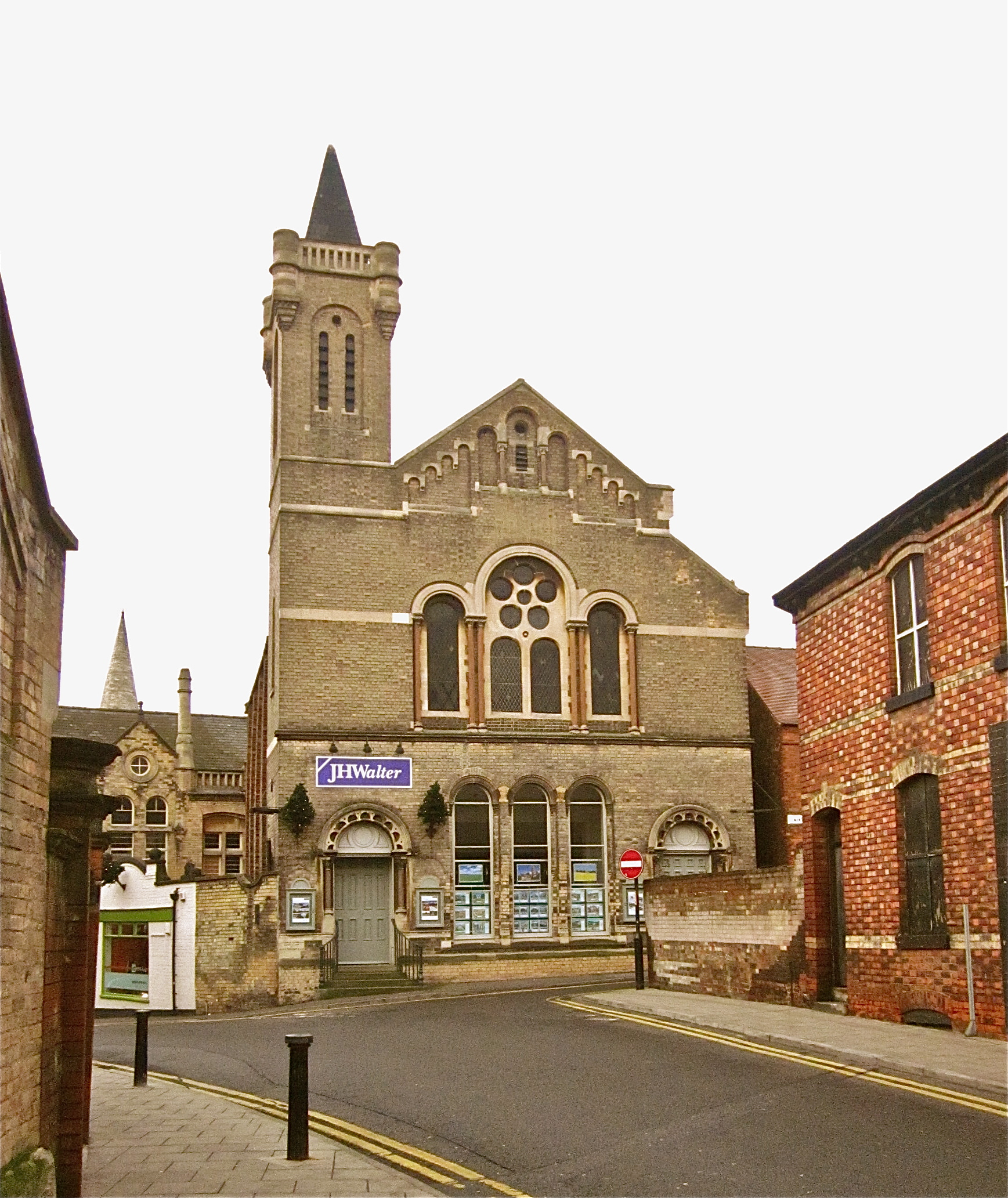
- Mint Street Baptist Church, Lincoln, 1870
- Born: 1841/2; Terrington, Yorkshire.
- Died: 7th. February 1913. Probably Lincoln
- Education: Christs Hospital School, Lincoln
- Occupation: Architect
- Practice: Drury and Mortimer. After c.1895 William Mortimer and Son.
- Buildings: Lloyd’s Bank, Lincoln. Lincoln Liberal Club.

William Mortimer (1841/42–1913) was an architect working in Lincoln from around 1858. He also played for the Lincolnshire County Cricket team.

== Career ==
Mortimer was born in Terrington, Yorkshire in 1841/2 and educated at the Christ's Hospital School, Lincoln and by 1858 was working as an architect in Lincoln. He played cricket for Lincolnshire against the All England Team in 1861 and 1862. William Mortimer married Frances Harrison of Boston (her father was a baker and corn merchant) in Boston in 1866. They lived at Walnut Cottage, Motherby Hill, Lincoln.

== Company history ==
From about 1870 or earlier William Mortimer was in partnership with Michael Drury as Drury and Mortimer until about 1878. After about 1895 he was in partnership with his son as W. Mortimer and Son. In 1889 he had his offices in Unity Square, off the Broadgate in Lincoln and in 1896 the Address is given as the Oddfellows Hall in Unity Square adjacent to Broadgate. From 1892 he was working in partnership with his son William Malkinson Mortimer. In 1896 the name changes to Mortimer and Sons, suggesting another son joined the partnership. The contract ledgers indicate two offices between March 1905 and May 1911, with presumably William Malkinson Mortimer moving to Essex undertaking developments in Colchester and Romford, Essex. Work in Norfolk and Huntingdon is also recorded. No entries are recorded between August 1914 and February 1920. William Malkinson Mortimer died in Essex at "The Corner," Great Nelmes, Hornchurch, on the 27th day of February, 1912 This was year before his father died, but the company was continued as Mortimer and Davies from 1913 to 1916. It would then appear to restart in 1920 as Davies J and changing to Davies J & Son in 1937 and continuing after the Second World War.

=== Dates of partnerships ===
These are based on the Survey of Lincolnshire Database

- Drury and Mortimer 1870-78 Silver Street or 1 Bank Street
- Mortimer W 1878–1892.
- Mortimer and Son 1892 -1896
- Mortimer W & Son 1893–1903
- Mortimer and Sons 1896- 1899
- Mortimer & Davies 1913–1916
- Davies J 1920–1937
- Davies J & Son 1938 -1951 (or later)

== Architectural work ==
=== Drury and Mortimer ===
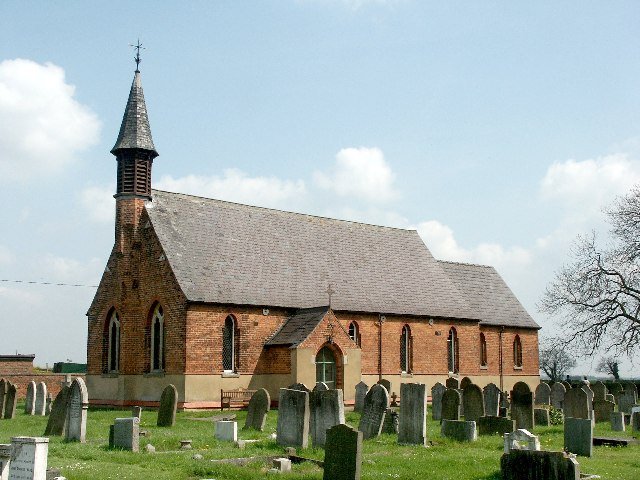
St Luke, North Kyme - Drury and Mortimer 1877

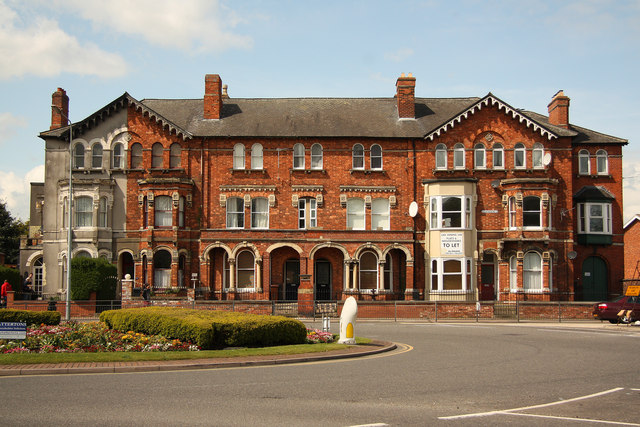
St Catherine's Villas

- Lincoln Mint St Baptist chapel. Now converted into the offices of Walters Estate agents, An example of Romanesque Revival architecture in a debased Italianate Romanesque revival style in 1870.
- North Kyme, St Luke's church. Red brick church built in 1877
- South Hykeham Restoration of church.
- Newark, Nottinghamshire Baptist Church, 1 Albert Street.
- Lincoln St Catherine's. St Catherine's Villas

=== Work of William Mortimer and W. Mortimer and Son ===
==== Public buildings ====
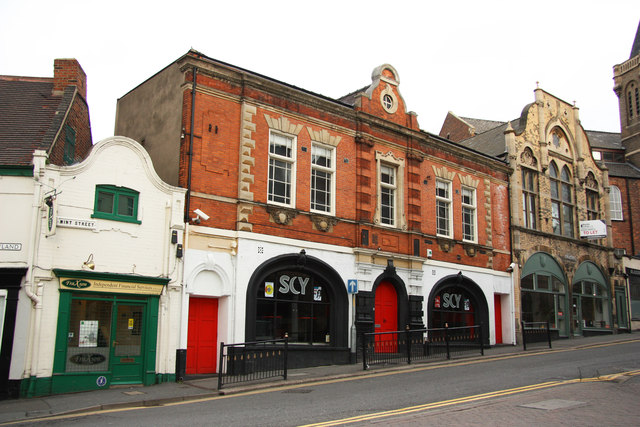
Former Masonic Rooms, Witham Lodge, 1894

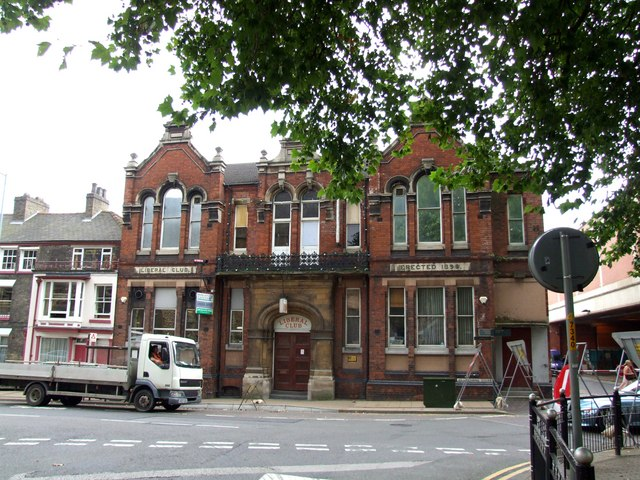
Liberal Club, Saltergate, Lincoln

- 1890 Liberal Club, Saltergate, Lincoln. Brick and terracotta with stone dressing, and a delicate iron balustrade over entrance.
- Masonic Rooms, 33,35,37, Mint Street, Lincoln. Two storey brick building with five bays and side extensions. Stone outer rustication. The central bay with lower entrance, flanked with terracotta ornamented pilasters and capped with a shaped gable. Built for the Witham Lodge in 1894.

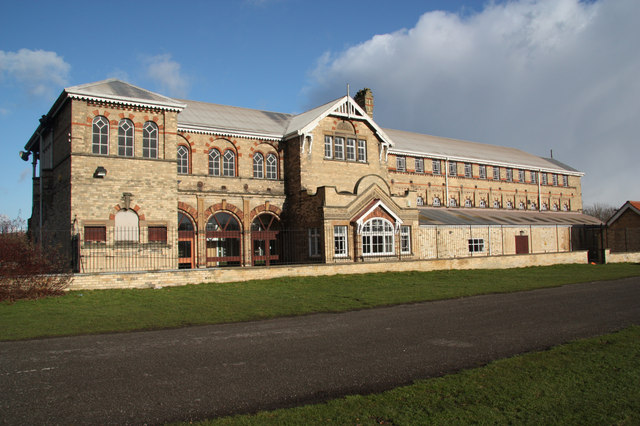
Lincoln Racecourse grandstand, 1897

- 1897. Lincoln Racecourse grandstand, Saxilby Road. Gault brick, with red brick dressings to window arches. Made asymmetrical by a trio of gables on one side of the two storey facade with twelve bays. Stone and cast-iron piers, hipped and gabled corrugated iron roofs with valances. The open front has wood and concrete terraces and coped brick end walls. The iron piers have scroll brackets. One gable is half-round with the Royal arms, flanked by single triangular gables, all with bargeboards. The building was listed Grade II in 1991.
- Temperance Hall, St Swithin's Square, Lincoln.(1899/1900) Later the Central Cinema. Built for the Lincoln Temperance Society. On the site of an earlier Temperance Hall on west side of Thorngate. Opened on 20 October 1902 and burnt down on 6 March 1944, when a new organ was being installed. Three storey building, with three central bays, with an arched pediment above, two open cupolas on either side of the pediment and balustraded at roof level. Central entrance and doors in left and right bays. Pedimented windows at first floor level and for crescentic oriels at second floor level.

==== Commercial buildings and banks ====
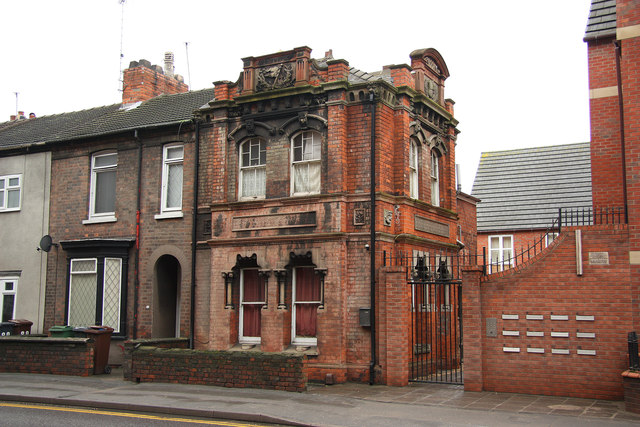
Fambrini & Daniels office, Canwick Road, 1889

- 1889. 65 Canwick Road, Lincoln. The offices of Fambrini & Daniels, artificial stone and terracotta manufacturers. A two-storied building of red brick, with many decorative features in brick and terracotta, including the city crest and an 1889 date-stone on the north elevation. The building was listed Grade II in 1999.
- 1890 Bray's Temperance Hotel. 472-473 High Street. Later the site of Taylor's Garage. Originally a row of shops with shaped and crow-stepped Dutch gables.

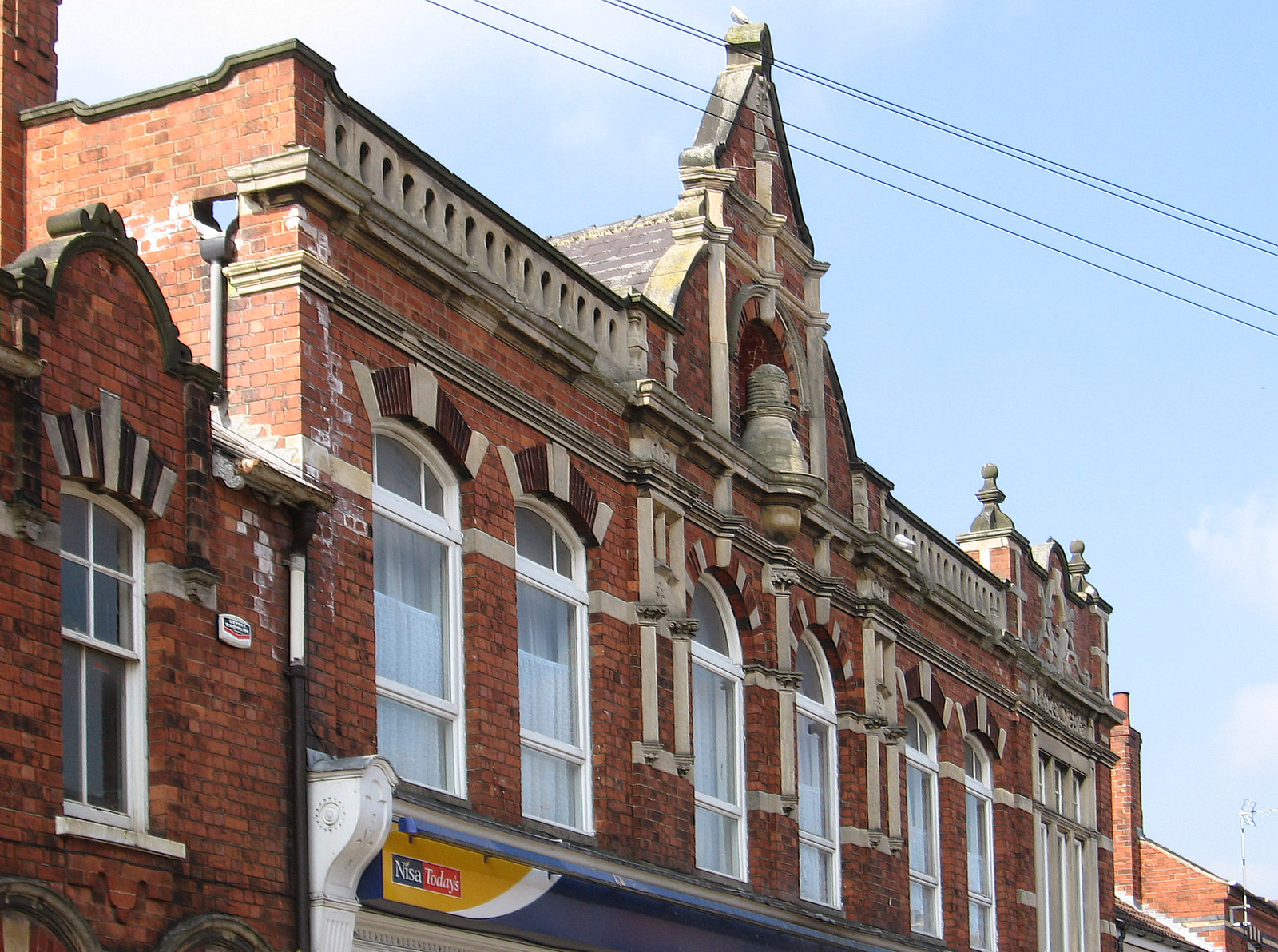
Former Market Rasen Co-op store on Union Street 1897

- 1897. Lincoln Co-operative Store, Union Street, Market Rasen. "Free Renaissance detailing with plenty of stonework. Original shop fronts" according to Pevsner.

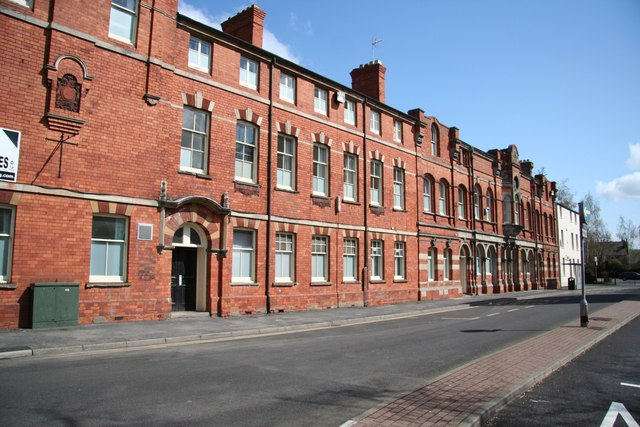
Oddfellows Hall, Unity Square, 1897

- 1897. The Oddfellows Hall, Unity Square, Lincoln. The earlier part of the building faces Unity Square Foundation/memorial stones laid 30 March 1878. Designed by W Mortimer of Drury and Mortimer builder James Weighell. At first floor level it has five bays on either side of an oriel window. The western part facing Broadgate was built in 1896/1897, builders Otter & Co, for the Oddfellows Hall Co. The original building facing Unity Square has a central arcaded section with two slightly projecting wings which contained William Mortimer's Offices, the Lincoln Land and Building Society and the Oddfellows' Medical Institute. The hall was used as the Ruston's Social Club from 1947 to the 1960s. Sited on the corner with Broadgate. The decorative entrance frontage is on Broadgate and is in the Queen Anne style. Pevsner describes the building as "orange brick with exuberant stone detail". Planning permission was granted in 2015 for its conversion into student accommodation, the property has now been purchased by, coincidently, Essex born couple Mr Thomas W J Mann and his wife Veronica J Mann, the building is being refurbished to accommodate students attending Lincoln University, the works are scheduled for 2018 with a completion date of September 2018.

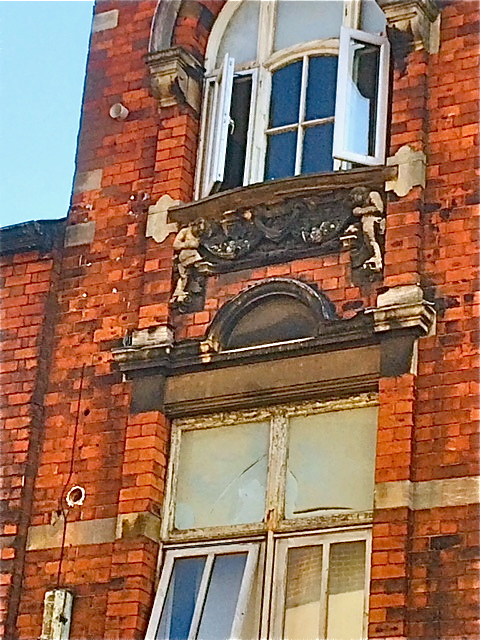
25-29 Corporation Street

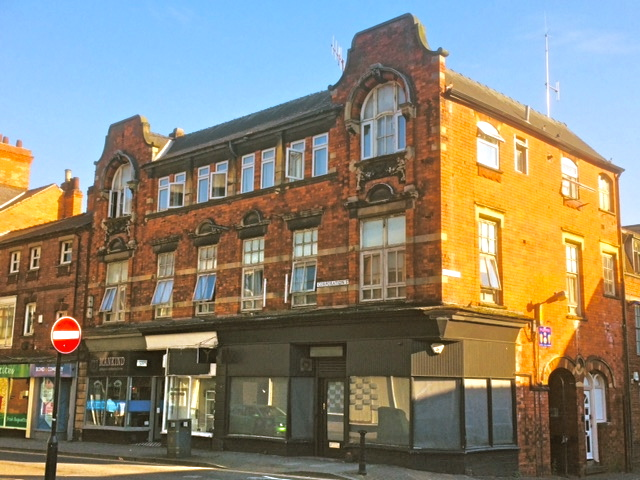
25-29 Corporation Street, Lincoln, 1898

- 25-29 Corporation Street, Lincoln.1898-9. Designed by Mortimer & Son Brick with artificial stone dressing. Three storeys. Two gabled bays with shaped gables and arched second floor windows with four bays between. Three bays on Hungate frontage with two arched doorways with decorative polychrome surrounds. Below the arched windows on the gables are artificial stone panels (possibly by Fambrini & Daniels) decorated with putti and draped

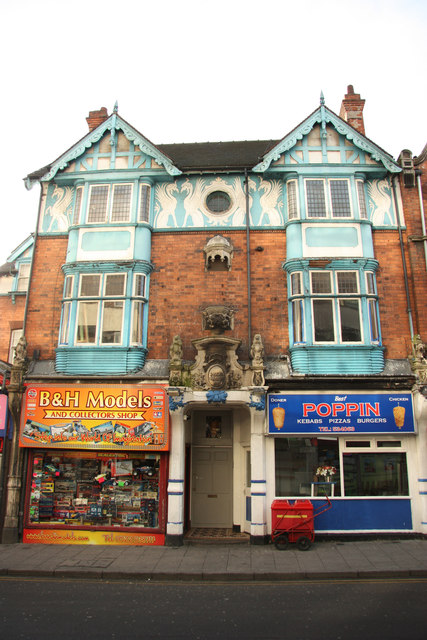
St.Hughs Chambers, Corporation Street, Lincoln 1899

- 1899. St Hugh's Chambers, Corporation Street, Lincoln. Originally the offices of the solicitors A Trotter and A Brook. One of the few buildings in Lincolnshire with Art Nouveau decoration. Corporation Street was a new road opened up to link High Street and Hungate in the late C19. Three storey elevation, red brick with Welsh slate roof, with half timber gabled bays, pargeting and ornamental stonework. The street frontage is symmetrical with a central entrance with a stone door case formed by flanking pilasters supporting an ornamented stone pediment with a central shield embossed with ‘’St Hughes Chambers 1899’’ flanked by pedestals bearing rampant lions.
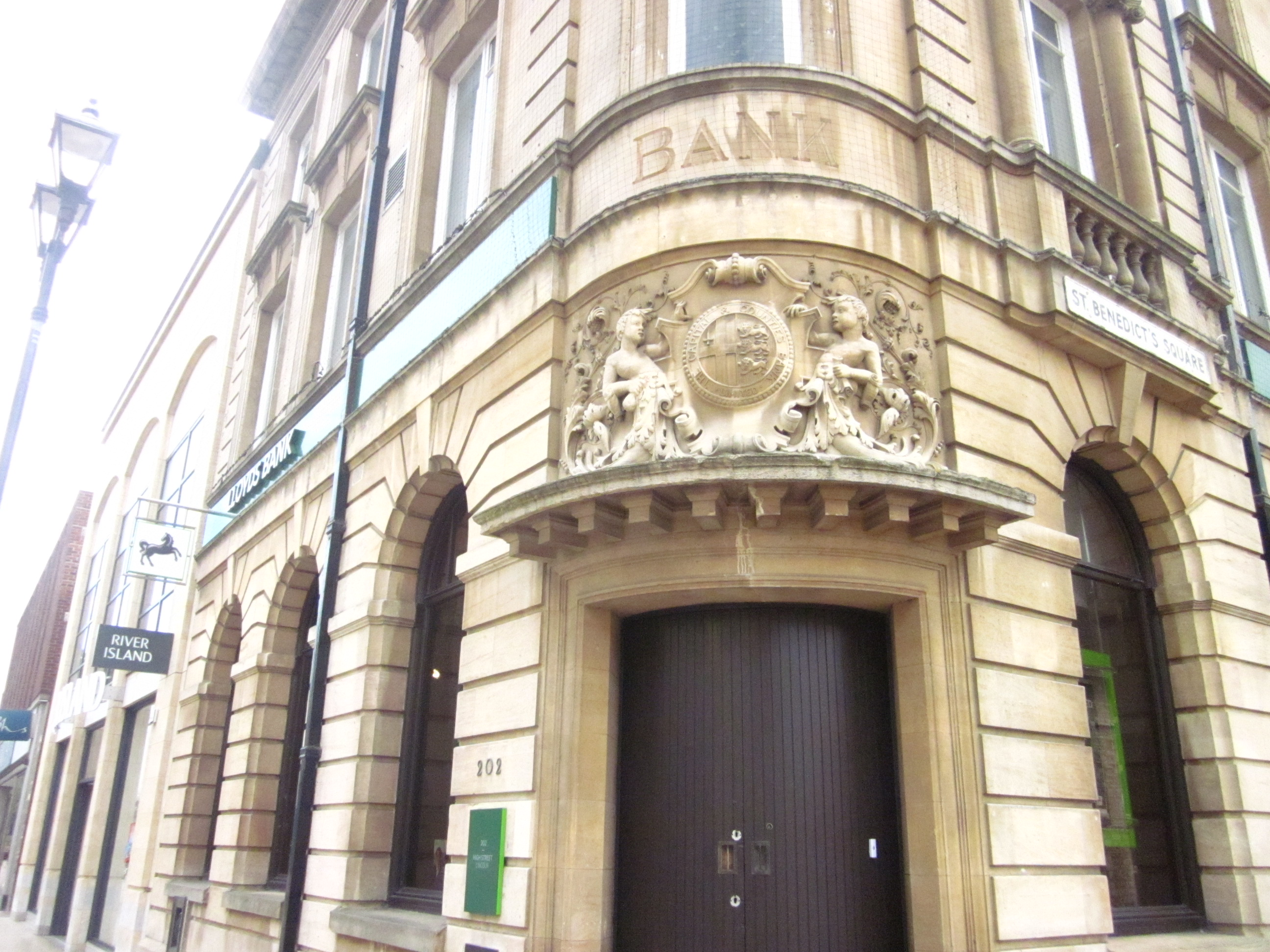
  Lloyds Bank, Lincoln
  Over the entrance at first floor level is a projecting canopied gothic style statue plinth with a projecting domed stone canopy above. At the centre, at second floor level, there is an oculus window. On either side of the window is wings is a pair of back-to-back griffins formed in relief by pargeting. The two bay windows are also have paired griffins. The building was listed Grade II in 2007.
- 24-29 Sincil Street, Lincoln.(1899) Described as "4 Houses & Shop & Lock up Shop" The lock up shop is now Pepperdine's butchers. Red brick with two shaped gables.
- Lloyd's Bank, 202 High Street/ St Benedicts Square. 1901–3. Stone facade. The building originally had a cupola, Described in Pevsner as ‘‘Dehydrated Georgian Baroque’’- it is actually quite good and more Classical than normal Edwardian Baroque Revival architecture.

=== Public houses ===
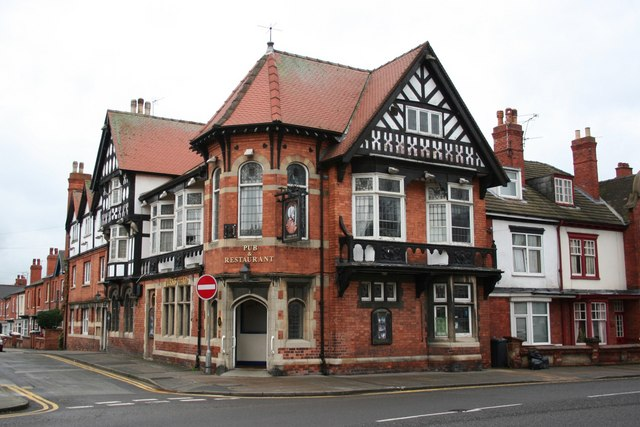
The Turks Head, Newport, Lincoln 1905

- The Turk’s Head. Newport, Lincoln. This public house was built as a development of properties for General Sir Mildmay Willson of Rauceby. The architect was William Mortimer and was completed in 1905. It closed as a public house in 2009.

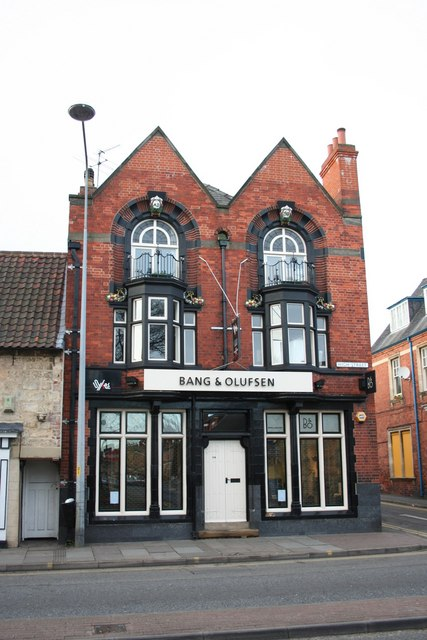
Bang and Olufsen, formerly Lincoln Arms. 1907

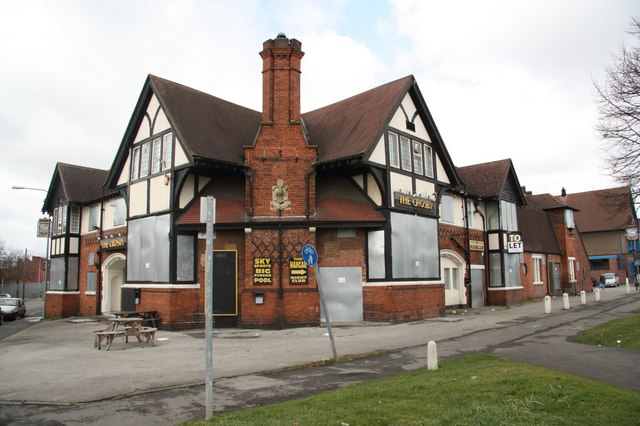
The Crosby Arms, 1910

- The Lincoln Arms, 114, High Street, Lincoln. 1907 Now Bang & Olufsen.
- 1910 The Crosby Arms Normanby Road Scunthorpe. In ‘‘Brewer’s Tudor’’. possible to make it more acceptable to the growing Temperance movement

=== Public house by J. Davies ===
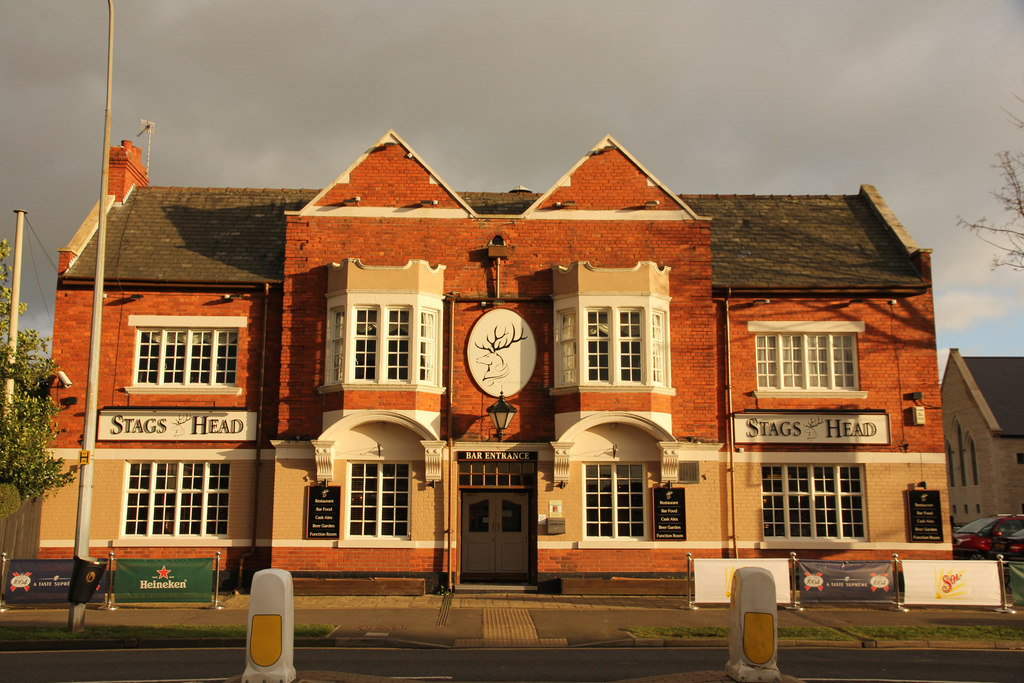
The Stags Head, Newport, Lincoln

- Stag's Head, 76 Newland, Lincoln. 1924 Designed for the Home Brewery

=== School ===
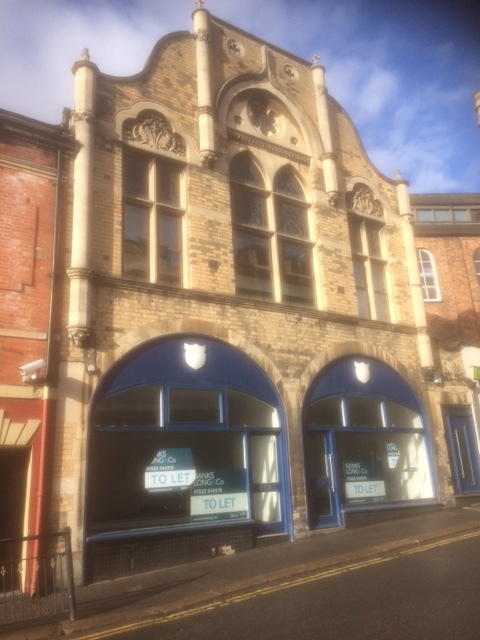
Mint Street Baptist School, Lincoln

- Baptist Sunday School, 29-31 Mint Street, Lincoln 1897. Attached to the Baptist Church. Yellow brick with artificial stone dressing, Gothic windows.

==== Houses ====
- 1882 Caenby Manor House, Caenby for J T. Tweed.
- 1890 Stonefield, 1 St Catherine's Road. 1890. Large gault brick house with reddish artificial stone used for window lintels and renaissance arch decoration over door. Built for Alderman T Wallis, a timber merchant.
- 1892 Longdales House, Longdales Road, Lincoln. Now a Guest House which forms part of Bishop Grosseteste University
- 12 The Avenue, Lincoln.1892. Corner of West Parade and the Avenue. Detached house and stables built for (John Adam Nissler, a very successful Lincoln pork butcher. Entrance on South side. Three bays. Queen Anne style. Forward gabled wing left and advanced ground floor and basement with steps leading up to a steeply pedimented door. Gabled wing to right parallel to the Avenue, with tall chimney stacks to side. The West parade side of the building has a semi-circular bay with arched "crenelation".
- 8 The Avenue, Lincoln. 1893. Two storey. Gault brick with artificial stone dressing and decoration. Advanced gable wing and recessed entrance to left with south front with a central column, first floor loggia "in antis" (a recessed balcony) and tall chimney stack. A stepped stringcourse with Tudoresque foliate decoration divided ground and first floor terminating in grotesque heads. Forward Dutch gable with lower crescentic three light bay domed window with two light windows above, columns with foliate columns to side and artificial stone tympanum with sunburst decoration. To the left canted three bay with decorative balcony and the light window with decorative surround.
- 121-131 Newland Street West, Lincoln.1894
- 19-25 The Avenue, Lincoln
- 102 West Parade, 1895/98. Queen Anne style. Brick house with white painted? terracotta dressing. Entrance on Upper Avenue and gabled wing on West Parade. Queen Anne revival with shaped Dutch gable on Avenue frontage. Gothic Hooded porch to right with recessed three light window above window above with decorative lintel. Semi-circular bay to left with circular "crenelation". Three light window above with armorial set above lintel.
- "Braeside", 135 Yarborough Road. Queen Anne style. (1897) Two storey with basement level and attics. Advanced canted bay left and advanced bay st second floor with expanded oculus window and forward bays with central, recessed, balustraded balcony above entrance to basement cellar. At attic level gable, a window and door which accesses a balcony over the canted bay. Half timbering on the gable. Impressive rectangular chimney stack almost centrally placed. The house had a garage added in 1904, possibly the earliest surviving garage in Lincoln.
- "Ferncliffe", 2 St Catherine's, Lincoln.1896 On the corner with Cross O Cliff Hill. Built for Alderman Wallis, a timber merchant. Elaborate three storey Queen Anne style House/Arts and Crafts with upper storey with mock timber framing.
- "Ashleigh", 9 Cross O'Cliff Hill. House built for John Lodge (MD Wagon & Engine Co.) Queen Anne style. Two storey, with centrally placed dormer with oculus window and advanced gable with half timbering. Below a crescentic bay window with balustrade and to left forward bay windows with balustrade.
- 27 The Avenue, Lincoln

==== Churches ====
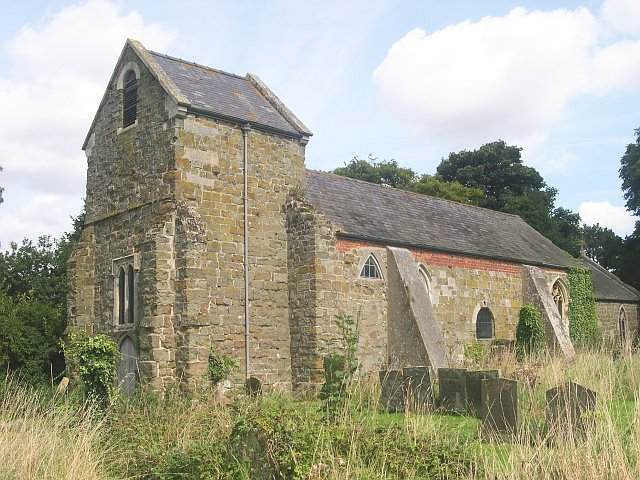
St Peter's Church, Asterby

Asterby church. Restoration work, c1900.

- Saltfleetby St Clements. Rebuilt church in 1885 on new site.

==== Methodist chapel ====
- Wesleyan Methodist Chapel on east side of Burton Road, Lincoln. Opened 4 December 1904. Brick with stone dressings, with large gothic window facing west.

== Literature ==
- Antram N (revised), Pevsner N & Harris J, (1989), The Buildings of England: Lincolnshire, Yale University Press.
