= Fambrini & Daniels =

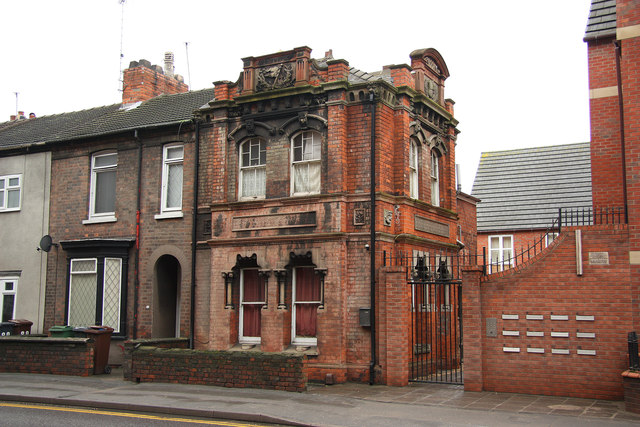
- Fambrini & Daniels office and works, Canwick Road,
- Industry: Building materials company
- Founded: c.1850?
- Defunct: after 1949
- Fate: Dissolved
- Successor: Lindum Artificial Stone (c1913)
- Headquarters: Canwick Road, Lincoln
- Products: Artificial stone mouldings and Terracotta manufacturer

Fambrini and Daniels were artificial stone and architectural terracotta manufacturers in Canwick Road, Lincoln, England. The company was probably founded in 1838. About 1913 it became the Lindum Stone Company which ceased trading after 1949.

== History ==
Joseph Fambrini, was born in Italy in 1815, possibly in Florence. He is first noted as a plaster manufacturer and landlord of the Packet Inn on Waterside North in Lincoln. The workshops in the 1860s were in Waterside South and then Newton Street, in what is now Sippers (formerly the Crown and Cushion) Public House and the adjoining property. In 1872 he is described as a modeller, and manufacturer of Plaster of Paris, Roman, Parian and other cements, enrichments etc. In 1878 he built a workshop at 85 Canwick Road, later developing it into the show-yard and offices of the company of Fambrini and Daniels. The surviving office building on Canwick Road of 1889, by the Lincoln architect William Mortimer, is a two-storied building of red brick, with many decorative features in brick and terracotta, including the city crest on the north elevation and an 1889 date-stone on the north elevation. The building was listed Grade II in 1999. In 1888 they also were manufacturing at the Excelsior Works in Monks Road, Lincoln an Imperishable Concrete Stone which they had invented. This was said to be a material resembling Portland stone and was used for embellishing the new Lincoln Hospital in that year. and also for the New Grand Opera House in Hull in 1893 After Fambrini's death in 1890, Daniel entered into a partnership with a Mr Webster.

== Examples of Fambrini and Daniels' work ==
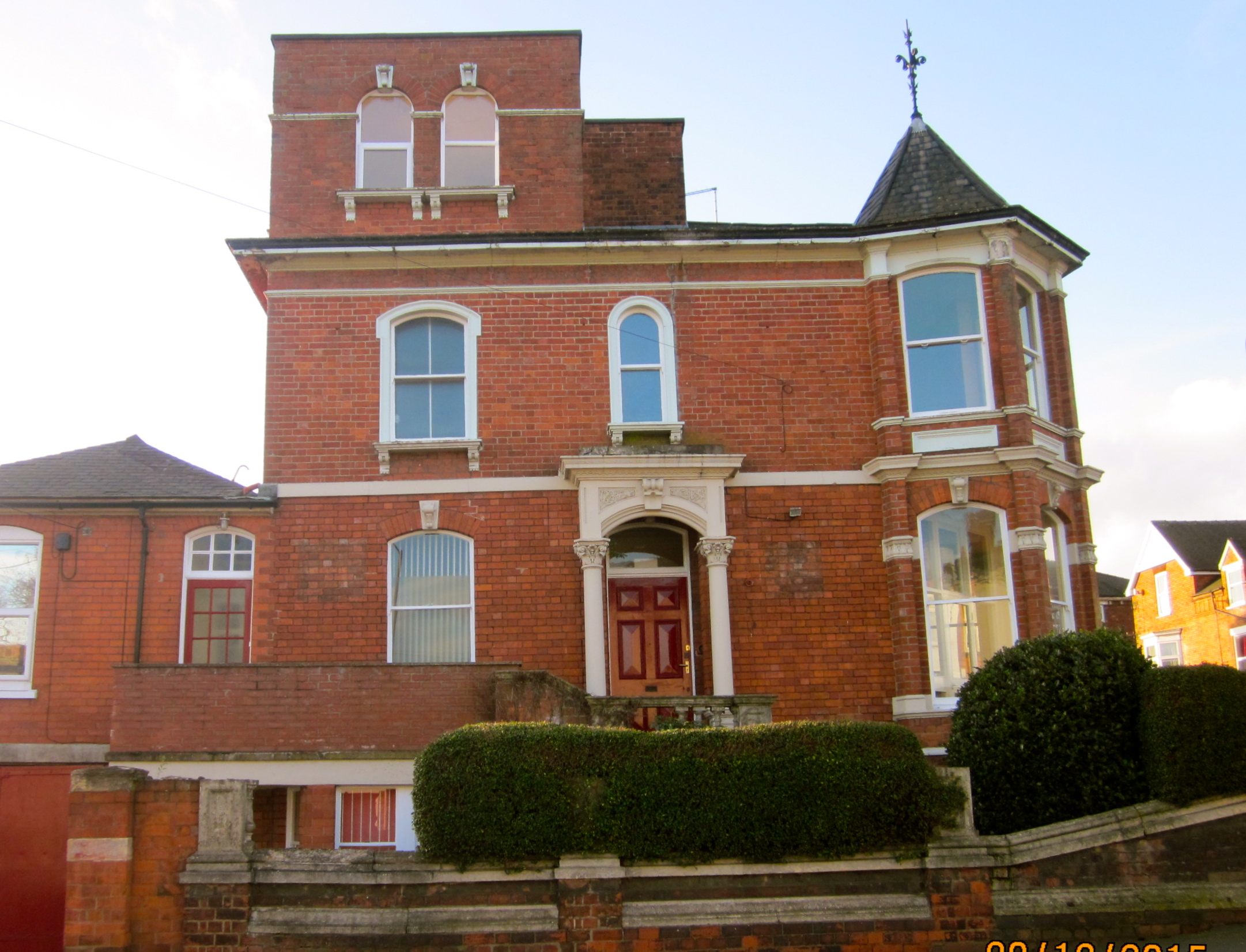
Villa Firenze, Monks Road, Lincoln 1876

Fambrini appears to have benefited from the rapid growth of Lincoln in the latter half of the 19th century. Many houses of the professional classes in the growing suburbs, as well as commercial buildings have artificial stone mouldings, often in the Gothic Revival style. However, only a few examples of their work can be definitely identified. In 1876 Fambrini had built for himself the large house on the corner of Monks Road (95 Monks Road) and Baggholme Road, and naturally had artificial stone to decorate it. Fambrini called this Florence villa, but after he died in 1890, his house was renamed Villa Firenze. The company's offices in Canwick Road were designed to exhibit many of the company's products. The eaves cornice have decorative corbels and banding, with above in parapet a projecting panel decorated with a pendant flag and wreath. Rainwater heads are in the form of monstrous heads. The side entrance facade has similar elaborate architectural detail. Topped with panel bearing Lincoln City coat of arms surmounted by segmental pediment bearing date 1889. Some red terracotta mouldings are used.

The Lincolnshire Chronicle in March 1894 reported that Fambrini and Daniels, have just erected an exceptionally large fountain at the Bridge of Weir, near Glasgow, for the trustees of the Orphanage Asylum of Scotland. The fountain is in red concrete, and stands 18 feet high. One of the special features of the structure is the large basin at the base, which, although seven feet in diameter, has been successfully cast in one piece. Basins of such dimensions are usually cast in sections; to cast them in one piece is a task seldom attempted, and still less seldom accomplished. In this case the casting has been entirely successful, the completed basin weighing a ton and a half. The second basin of the fountain is supported by three huge Dolphins intertwined, and the top one by the kneeling figure of a Nubian boy.

The company is known to have provided mouldings for the domes, finials and decorative panels on the stepped gables of Southport Opera House, Lord Street, Southport (1890–91) by the well known theatre architect Frank Matcham. They were described in The Builder as being of imperishable red concrete masonry. The Opera House, with a capacity for 2000, opened on 7 September 1891 and was destroyed by fire 1929.

=== Possible Examples of Artificial Stone and Terracotta in Lincoln ===
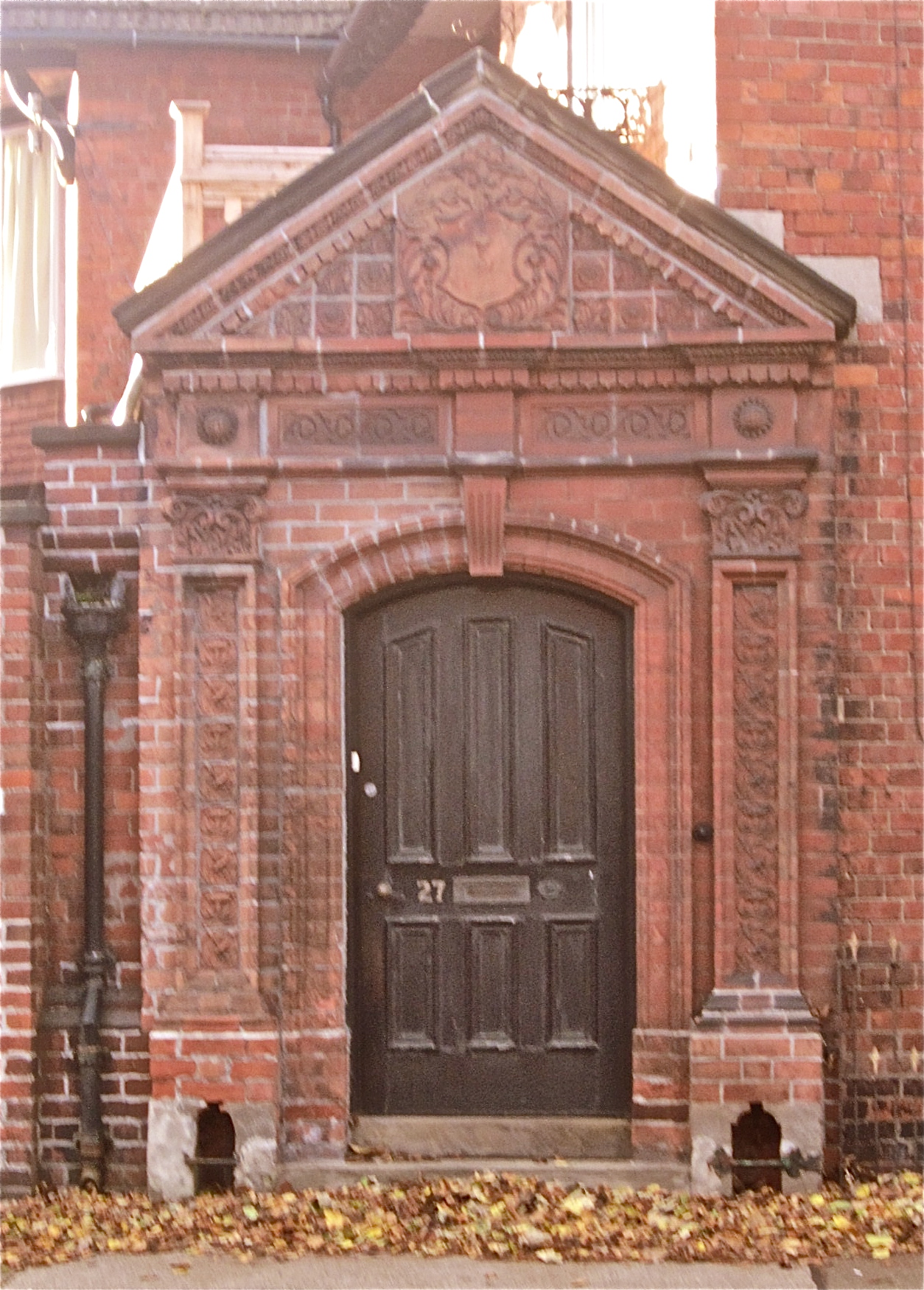
Terracotta Archway, 27 Wragby Road, Lincoln, possibly by Fambrini and Daniels

There are many examples of decorative artificial stonework and terracotta decorative features on the later Victorian buildings in Lincoln. It is likely that William Mortimer would have patronised the company, particularly for his terracotta revival buildings such the Lincoln Liberal Club and the Oddfellows Hall. The terracotta used is a deeper reddish hue than that coming from other sources such as Ruabon and Doulton, used by another Lincoln architect William Watkins. This terracotta is of noticeably lower quality than that produced elsewhere and often tends to flake.

== Bibliography ==
- Michael Stratton, (1993) The Terracotta Revival: Building Innovation and the Image of the Industrial City in Britain and North America, Gollanz, London.
- Brian Walker (ed) (1980) Frank Matcham; Theatre Architect Belfast
