= John Langwith Sr. =

John Langwith, Sr.
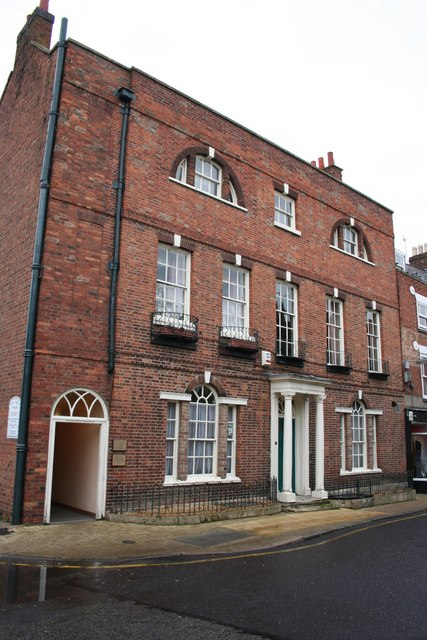
- Vine House, Grantham by John Langwith 1764.
- Born: c.1723 possibly Grantham, Lincolnshire
- Died: 1795 (aged 71–72); Harston, Lincolnshire
- Occupation: Architect
- Buildings: Syston New Hall

John Langwith, Sr. (c.1723–1795) was an English carpenter and architect who worked in Grantham, Lincolnshire. His son John Langwith Jr. (c1753-1825) was also an architect who worked in Grantham.

== Work by John Langwith ==
In 1785, Langwith was one of the three architects who submitted designs for the County Gaol in Lincoln Castle, but the work was awarded to William Lumby.

- Syston New Hall, Lincolnshire. He worked on the new building for Sir John Thorold between 1766 and 1775 and the north wing was built ‘‘according to a plan by John Langwith’’ Syston New Hall was demolished c. 1930.

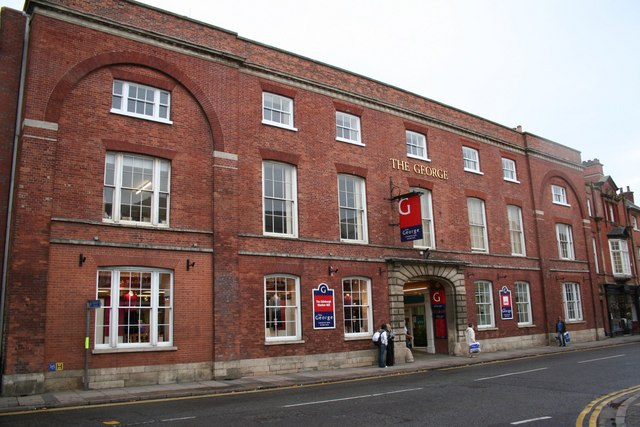
The George Hotel in Grantham

- George Hotel, Grantham 1780. An important coaching inn on the Great North Road
- Vine house, Vine street. Grantham. 1764. This building has been attributed to John Langwith, senior,

== Literature ==
- Antram N (revised), Pevsner N & Harris J, (1989), The Buildings of England: Lincolnshire, Yale University Press.
- Colvin H. A (1995), Biographical Dictionary of British Architects 1600-1840. Yale University Press, 3rd edition London, pg.599.
- Worsley G.(1987). Georgian Buildings in Grantham , Country Life, 4th. June.
