= Architectural terracotta =

Fired clay construction material

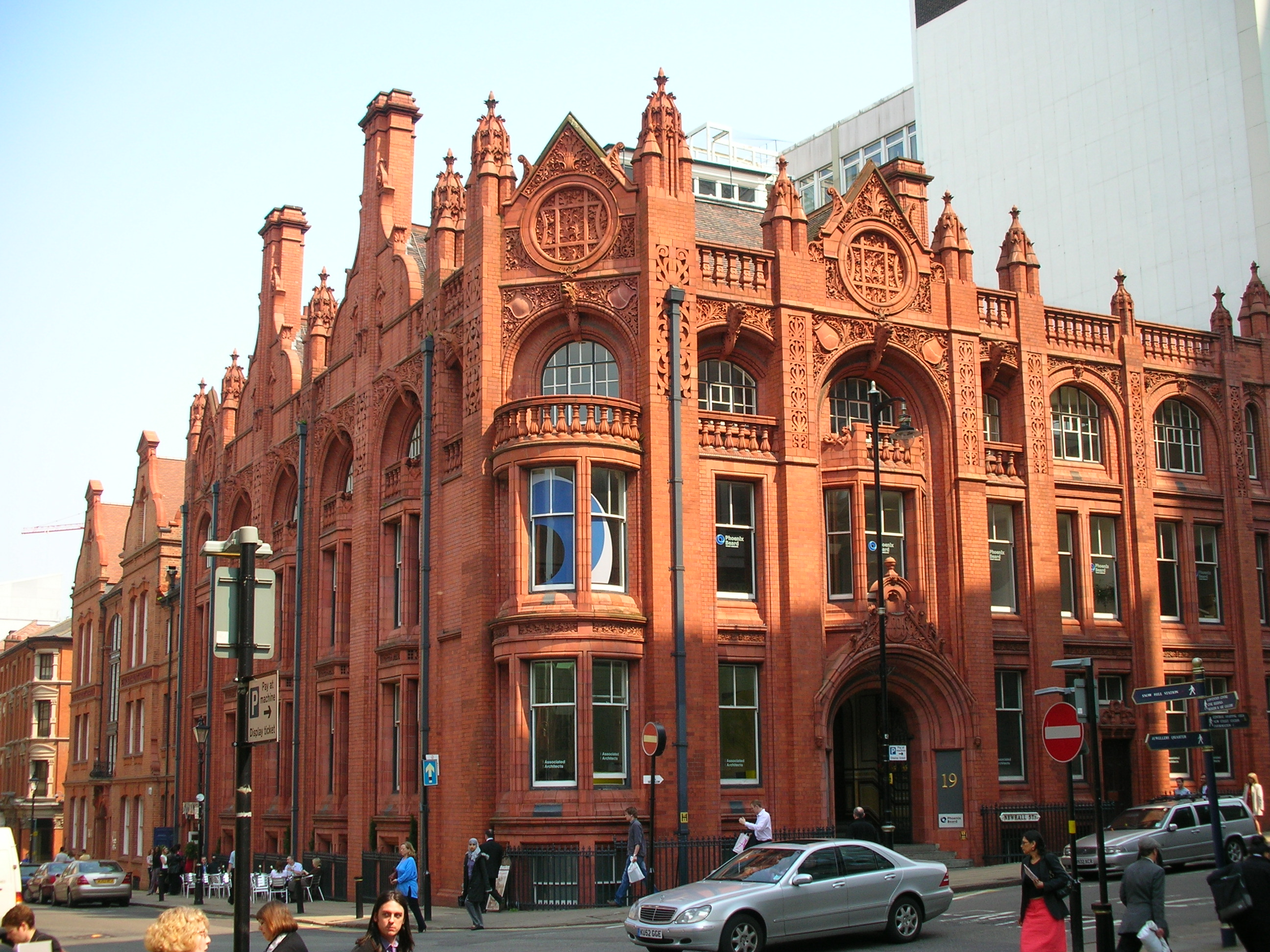
The Bell Edison Telephone Building in Birmingham is a late 19th-century red brick and architectural terracotta building.

Architectural terracotta refers to a fired mixture of clay and water that can be used in a non-structural, semi-structural, or structural capacity on the exterior or interior of a building. Terracotta is an ancient building material whose name translates from Italian as "baked earth". Some architectural terracotta is stronger than stoneware. It can be unglazed, painted, slip glazed, or glazed.

Usually solid in earlier uses, in most cases from the 19th century onwards each piece of terracotta is composed of a hollow clay web enclosing a void space or cell. The cell can be installed in compression with mortar or hung with metal anchors; such cells are often partially backfilled with mortar.

Terracotta can be used together with brick, for ornamental areas; if the source of the clay is the same they can be made to harmonize, or if different to contrast. It is often a cladding over a different structural material.

== History ==
Terracotta was made by the ancient Greeks, Babylonians, ancient Egyptians, Romans, Chinese, and the Indus River Valley and Native American cultures. It was used for roof tiles, medallions, statues, capitals and other small architectural details.

=== Ancient Eastern terracotta ===
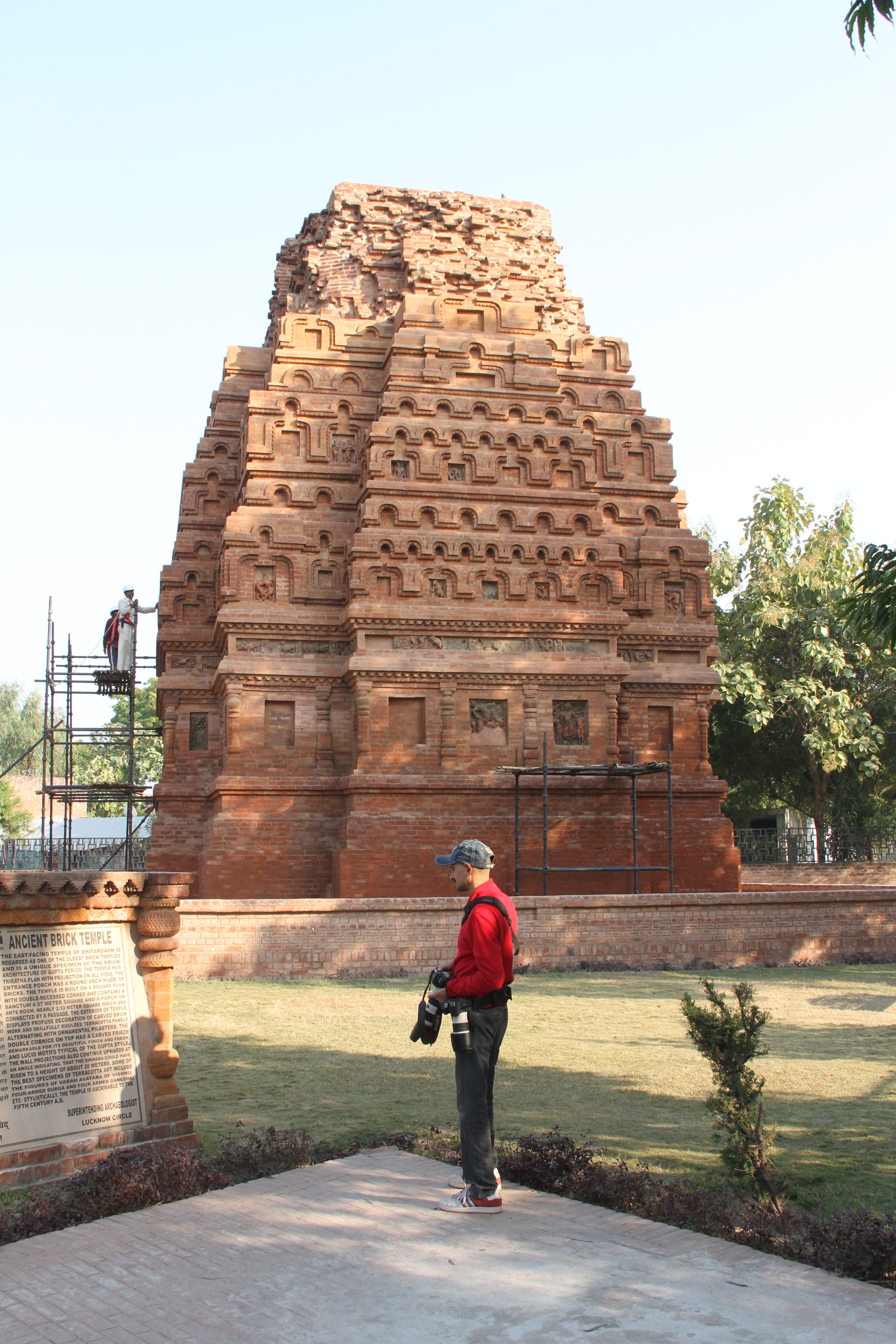
Brick temple in Bhitargaon, Kanpur

Indian terracotta manufacturers hand pressed, poured, and double-molded the clay mix. Plaster casts have been found in several ancient sites in Afghanistan, Bangladesh, India and Pakistan. Similarities in motifs and manufacturing processes have caused scholars to note cross cultural pollination between the Hellenic and Indus River Valley sculptural terracotta traditions. Famous early examples include the Bhitargaon temple and the Jain temple in the Mahbubnagar district.

Chinese, Korean, and Japanese terracotta making traditions were focused on non-architectural uses such as statuary or cookware but various forms of terracotta tiles were popular roofing materials.

=== Western terracotta ===
==== Antiquity–1700s ====
Greeks used terracotta for capitals, friezes, and other elements of their temples like at Olympia or Selenius. Domestically they used it for statuary and roof tiles. The Etruscans used terracotta for roof tiles, encased beams, and enclosed brick walls with it. The Roman terracotta innovation was the underfloor or hypocaust heating system that they used for their bath houses. Medieval European architecture did not expand terracotta use beyond the ancients. The manufacture of tile roofs diminished with low cost thatch roofing widely available.

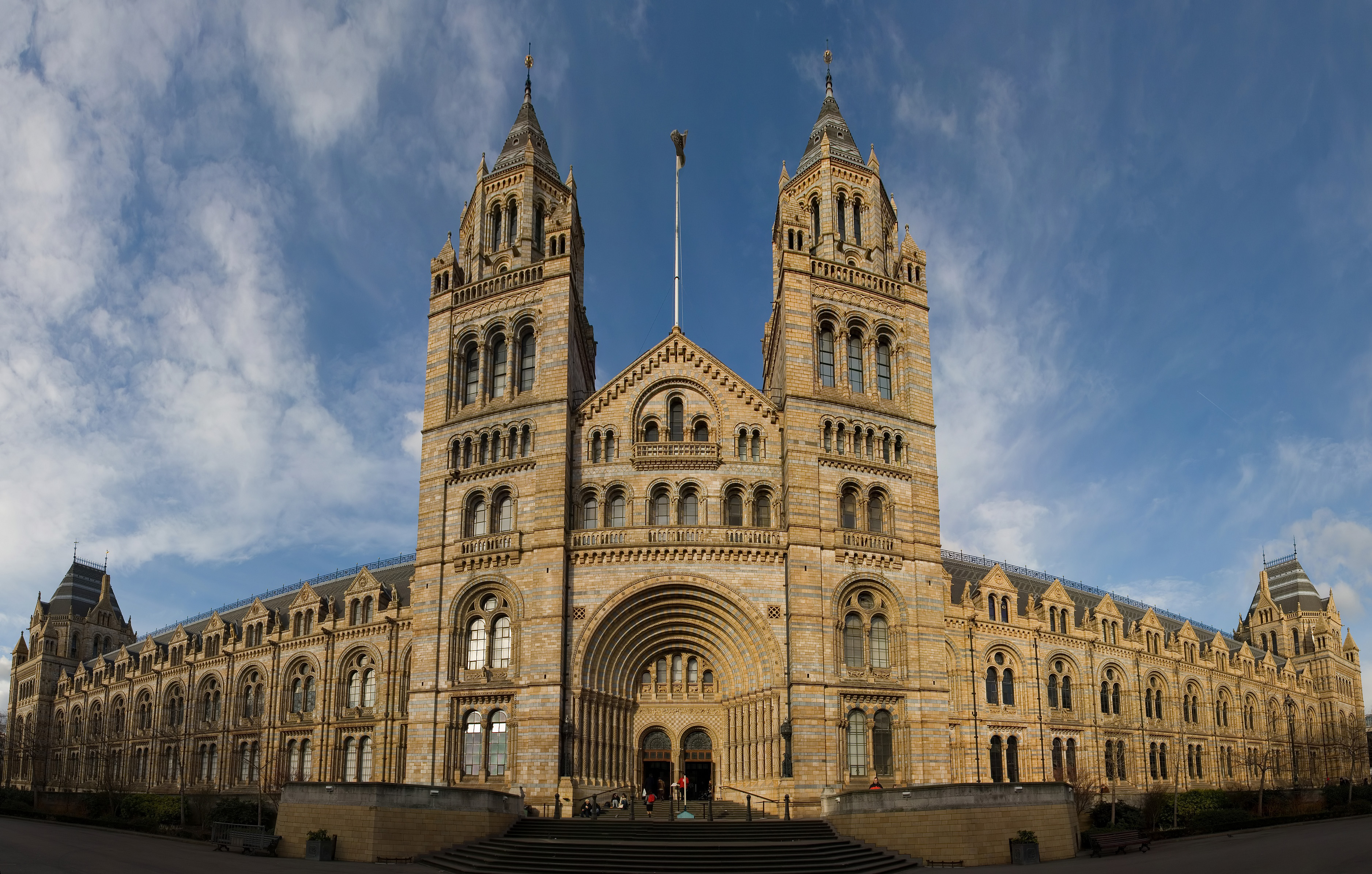
The Natural History Museum in London has an ornate terracotta facade typical of high Victorian architecture – the carvings represent the contents of the museum.

==== 1700s–1880s ====
===== Great Britain =====
Richard Holt and Thomas Ripley patented an artificial stone recipe in 1722. The business was fairly successful at making small architectural ornaments. Their company was taken over by George and Eleanor Coade in 1769. [See Coade stone, See Eleanor Coade ] George died a year later, leaving the company to his wife and daughter, both named Eleanor Coade. The Coade ladies popularized the grey mix of terracotta as an alternative to stone with the help of architects like Horace Walpole and Sir John Soane. Georgian architectural style was in vogue and demand for repetitive, classically inspired décor was very fashionable. The Victoria and Albert Museum (1867–1880) and the Natural History Museum of London (1879–1880) buildings ushered in an era of mass-produced architectural terracotta.

=== North America ===
==== Early manufacture: 1840s–1860s ====
The earliest manufacturer of architectural terracotta in the United States was started by Henry Tolman Jr. in Worcester, Massachusetts, around 1849. In the 1850s, New York City architects like Richard Upjohn and James Renwick used it on some of their projects, but the material failed to gain widespread popularity and many American architects falsely believed it couldn't endure the North American climate.

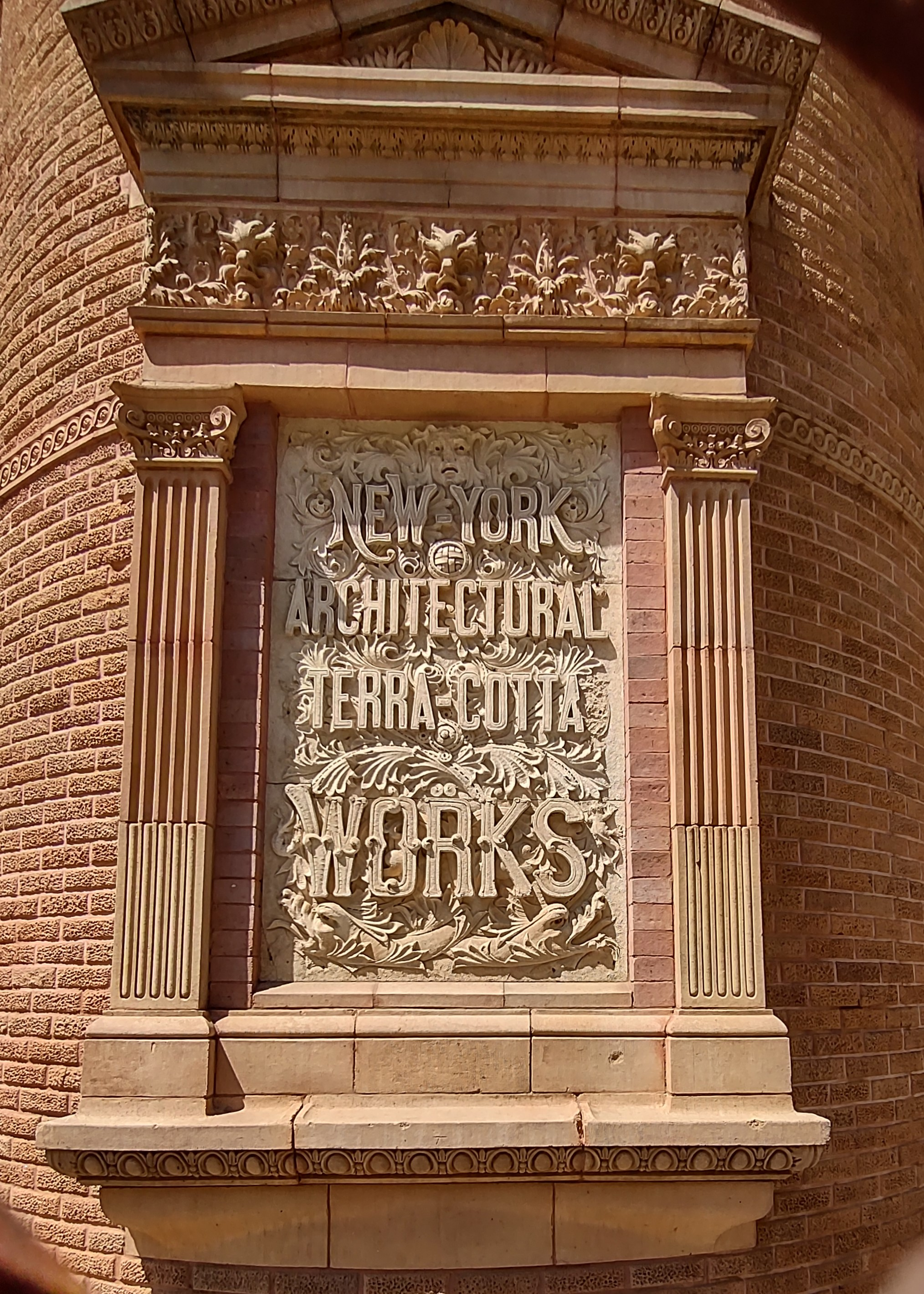
The New York Architectural Terra-Cotta Company was one of many manufacturers of architectural terracotta in the United States between the late 1800s and 1920s.

==== 1870s–1930s ====
The Chicago Fire of 1871 destroyed many of the wood and stone-constructed buildings of Chicago, Illinois, and spurred greater interest in fireproof building materials that could enable the elaborate construction of the era. James Taylor, an English-trained ceramicist, played a key role in establishing effective widespread terracotta production in the United States through his work for various firms such as the Chicago Terra Cotta Company, the Boston Terra Cotta Company, and the New York Architectural Terra-Cotta Company.

The American architectural terracotta industry peaked during the late 1800s and helped enable the construction of skyscrapers by allowing for more lightweight construction on top of tall metal-framed structures. The fire-resistance of terracotta protected structural steel on many buildings constructed during this period, such as New York City's Flatiron Building.

There was an increase in popularity of architectural terracotta made with colored, or polychrome, glazed architectural terracotta during the first decade of the 1900s. Architects began to employ combinations of colors to achieve dynamic designs and appearances. This usage diminished as time went on, especially after the success of Cass Gilbert's Woolworth Building increased demand for monochromatic terracotta. Trends in the 1920s favored setbacks in skyscraper towers, leading to increasing demand for sculpted forms in low relief.

==== 1930s–1980s ====
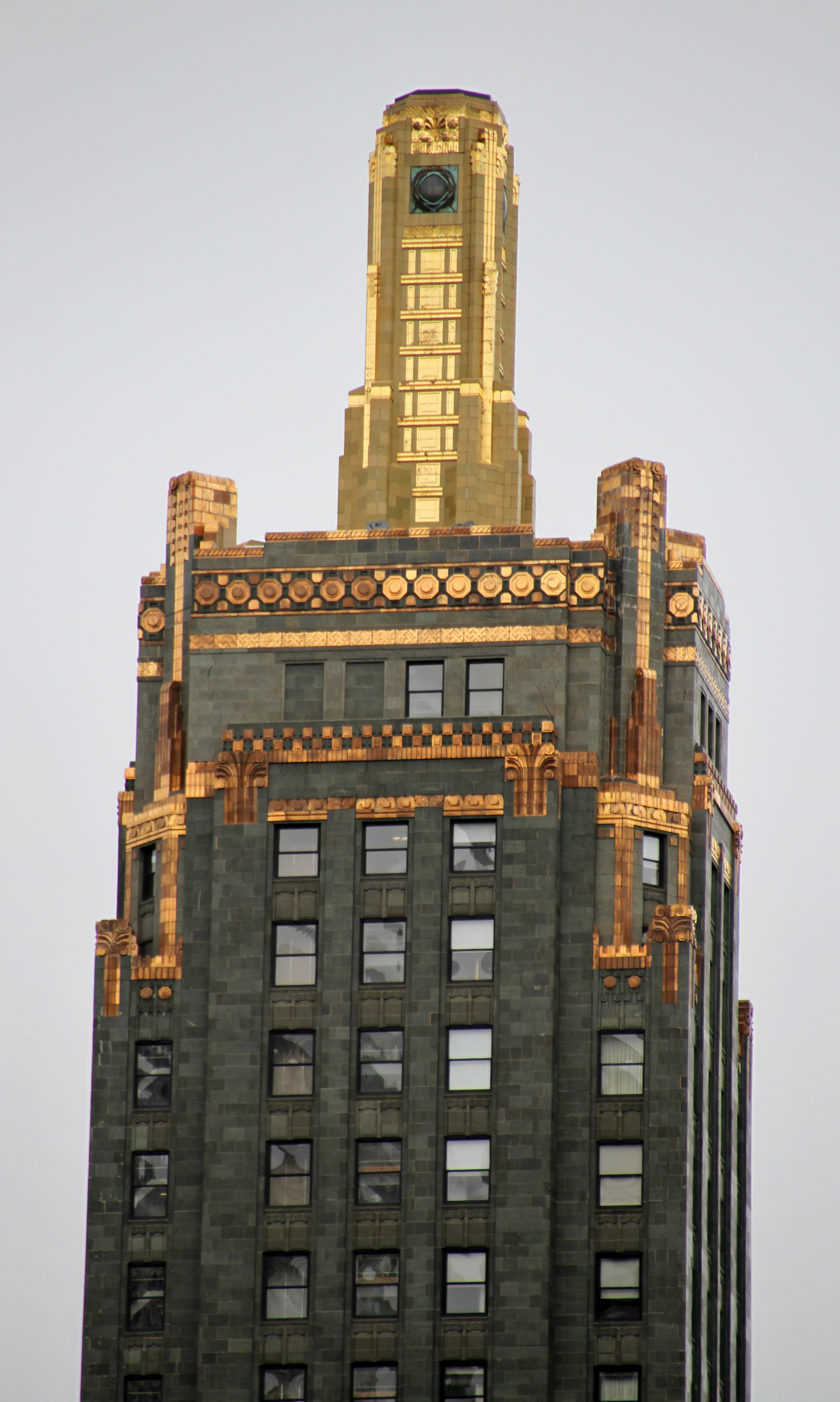
The Carbide and Carbon Building in Chicago, Illinois features glazed architectural terracotta in an art deco style.

Usage of terracotta in architecture had diminished through the end of the 1920s and the onset of the Great Depression further harmed the industry: the number of terracotta companies dropped from eighteen in 1929 to eleven in 1933. This was largely attributed to architect's increasing preference for building with cheaper metal, glass, and cement.

The time-intensive process of terracotta manufacture put it at a disadvantage compared to newer products. Changing fashions towards more minimalist, modern styles such as the Bauhaus School and International Style further harmed the industry, despite attempts by manufacturers to create products suited to these styles.

Structural problems of earlier terracotta resulting from incomplete waterproofing, improper installation, poor maintenance, and interior corroding mild steel provided bad publicity for terracotta and further harmed its reputation for architects. For much of the 20th century the American terracotta industry was a fraction of its earlier scale and the few surviving companies largely subsisted on jobs producing less complex products like machine-produced ceramic veneers.

Detailed architectural terracotta remained in use through the 1950s and 1960s, however it was often overlooked or misidentified. Architects during this time period did not embrace terracotta's natural properties and instead tended to use it to imitate other materials.

==== 1980s–present ====
Terracotta experienced a growth in popularity beginning in the 1980s when a resurgence in interest in historic preservation led to demand for architectural terracotta for restoration purposes. Historic manufacturers of terracotta such as Gladding, McBean, Ludowici-Celadon, and newer companies such as Boston Valley Terra Cotta all manufactured pieces used in the restoration of landmarks.

Architects became interested in newer uses for terracotta and companies developed products such as rainscreen and wall cladding to allow for dynamic installations that retained terracotta's unique and distinct qualities while working with modern architectural styles.

== Manufacturing process ==
Terracotta can be made by pouring or pressing the mix into a plaster or sandstone mold, clay can be hand carved, or mix can be extruded into a mold using specialized machines. Clay shrinks as it dries from water loss therefore all molds are made slightly larger than the required dimensions. After the desired green-ware, or air dried, shape is created it is fired in a kiln for several days where it shrinks even further. The hot clay is slowly cooled then hand finished. The ceramics are shipped to the project site where they are installed by local contractors. The hollow pieces are partially backfilled with mortar then placed into the wall, suspended from metal anchors, or hung on metal shelf angles.

=== Design ===
Academically trained artists were often the designers of the terracotta forms. Their drawings would be interpreted by the manufacturer who would plan out the joint locations and anchoring system. Once finalized, the drawings were turned into a plaster reality by sculptors who would create the mold for the craftsmen.

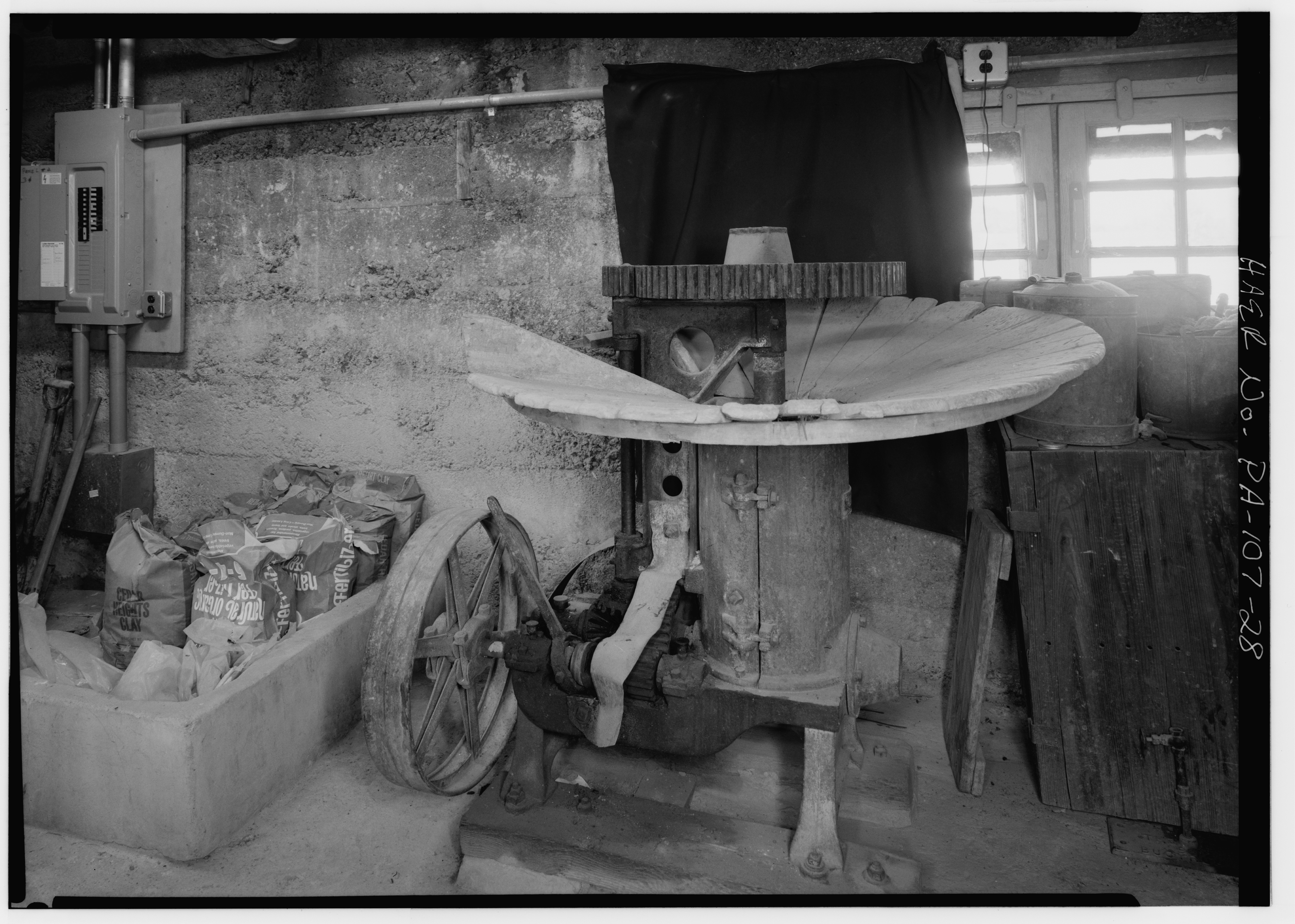
Vertical pugmill used by the Moravian Pottery and Tile Works in Pennsylvania to refine the clay used for tile production

=== Clay preparation ===
Clay selection was very important to manufacture of terracotta. Homogenous, finer grain sizes were preferred. The color of the clay body was determined by the types of deposits that were locally available to the manufacture. Sand was added to temper the process. Crushed ceramic scraps called grog were also added to stiffen the product and help reduce shrinkage.

Weathering the clay allowed pyrites to chemically change to hydrated ferric oxide and reduced alkali content. This aging minimizes the potential chemical changes during the rest of the manufacturing process. The weathered raw clay was dried, ground, and screened. Later, it would have been pugged in a mill that would mix the clay with water using rotating blades and force the blend through a sieve.

=== Hand pressing terracotta ===
An artist makes a negative plaster mold based on a clay positive prototype. 1–1¼" of the clay/water mixture is pressed into the mold. Wire mesh or other stiffeners are added to create the web, or clay body that surrounds the hollow cell. The product is air dried to allow the plaster to suck the moisture out of the green clay product. It is fired then slowly cooled.

=== Extrusion ===
Mechanized extrusion was used for the mass-production of terracotta blocks, popular in the 1920s. Prepared clay was fed into a machine that would then push the mix through a mold. The technique required the blocks to be made with simple shapes, so this process was often used for flooring, roofing, cladding, and later hollow clay tiles.

A downdraft kiln designed for the Pomona Terra Cotta Manufacturing Company in Guilford County, North Carolina

=== Glazing ===
The last step before firing the greenware was glazing. True glazes are made from various salts but prior to the 1890s most blocks were slip glazed or coated with a watered-down version of the clay mix. Liquefying the clay increased the amount of small silica particles that would be deposited on the surface of the block. These would melt during firing and harden. By 1900 almost all colors could be achieved with the addition of salt glazes. Black or brown were made by adding manganese oxide.

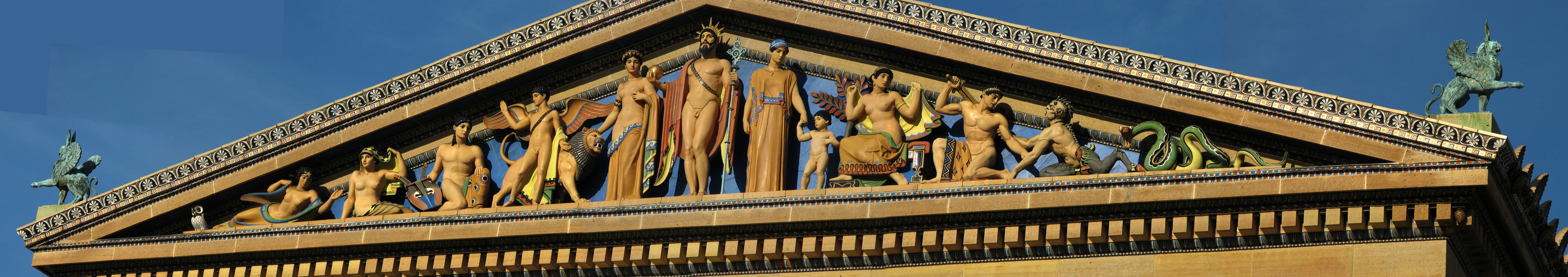
Philadelphia Art Museum's terracotta pediment using polychrome glazing

=== Firing ===
The kiln firing process could take days, up to two weeks. The clay is heated slowly to around 500°C to sweat off the loose or macroscopic water between the molecules. Then the temperature is increased to close to 900°C to release the chemically bonded water in gaseous form and the clay particles will begin to melt together or sinter. If the kiln reaches 1000°C then the clay particles will vitrtify and become glass like. After the maximum temperature was reached then the clay was slowly cooled over a few days. During firing a fireskin is created. A fireskin is the glass-like "bread crust" that covers the biscuit or interior body.

Various kilns were used as technology developed and capital was available for investment. Muffle kilns were the most common kiln. They were used as early as 1870. The kilns burned gas, coal, or oil that heated an interior chamber from an exterior chamber. The walls "muffled" the heat so the greenware was not directly exposed to the flames.

Down-draught kilns were also widely used. The interior chamber radiated heat around the terracotta by pulling in hot air from behind an exterior cavity wall. Like the muffle wall, the cavity wall protected the greenware from burning.

=== Installation ===
The earliest terracotta elements were laid directly into the masonry but as structural metal became more popular terracotta was suspended by metal anchors. The development of cast and later wrought iron as a structural material was closely linked to the rise of terracotta. Cast iron was first used as columns in the 1820s by William Strickland. Over the course of the 19th century metal became more incorporated into construction but it was not widely used structurally until the late 1890s.

A series of disastrous fires (Chicago, 1871; Boston, 1872; and San Francisco, 1906) earned terracotta a reputation for being a fireproof, lightweight cladding material that could protect metal from melting. Holes were bored in the hollow blocks in choice locations to allow for metal 'J' or 'Z' hooks to connect the blocks to the load bearing steel frame and/or masonry walls. The metal could be hung vertically or anchored horizontally. Pins, clamps, clips, plates, and a variety of other devices were used to help secure the blocks. The joints would then be mortared and the block would be partially backfilled.

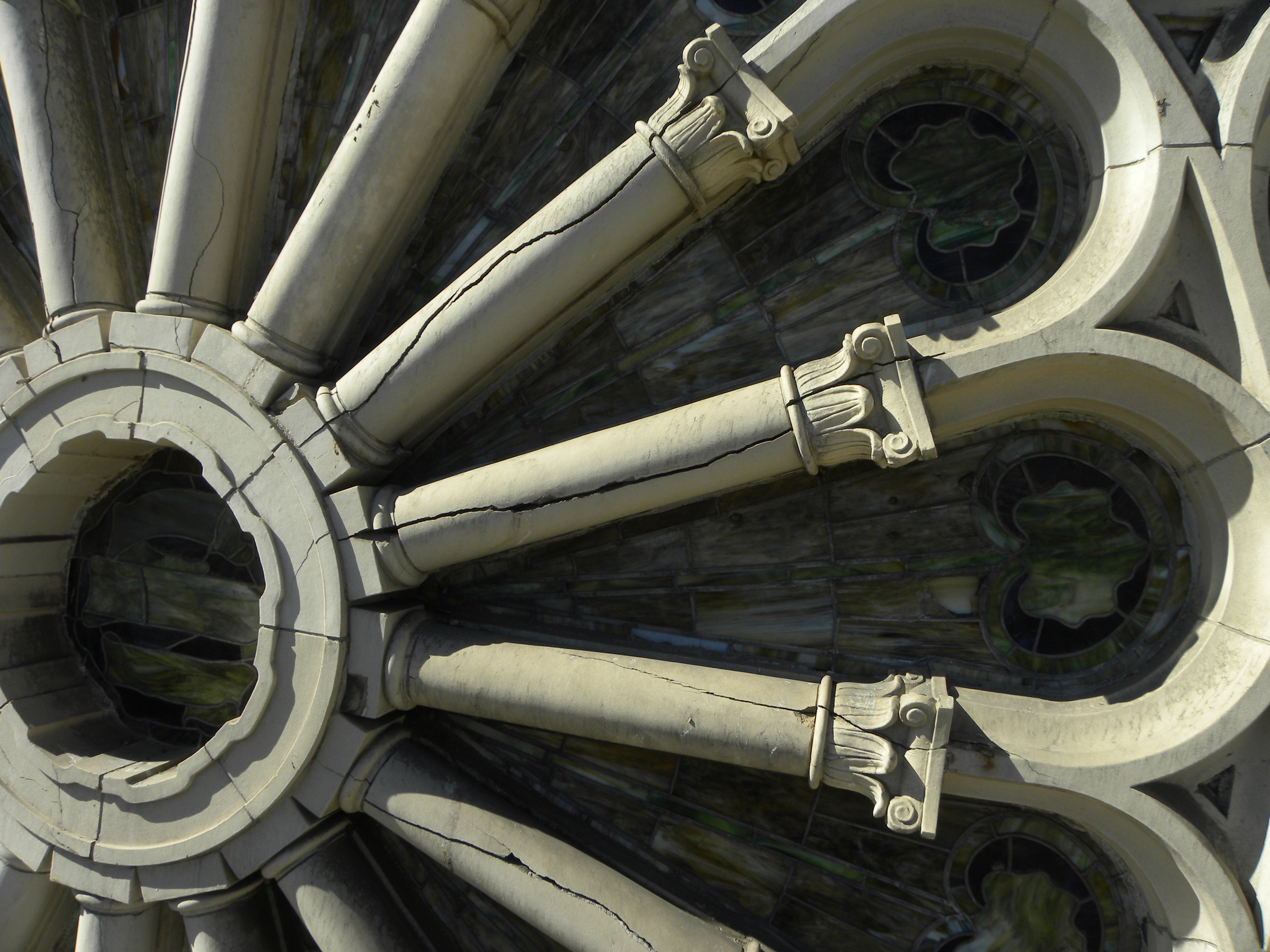
Cracking caused by corroding metal anchors at the First Congregational Church of Long Beach, California

== Chemistry ==
=== Composition ===
Terracotta is made of a clay or silt matrix, a fluxing agent, and grog or bits of previously fired clay. Clays are the remnants of weathered rocks that are smaller than 2 microns. They are composed of silica and alumina. Kaolinite, halloysite, montmorillonite, illite and mica are all good types of clays for ceramic production. When mixed with water they create hydrous aluminum silica that is plastic and moldable. During the firing process the clays lose their water and become a hardened ceramic body.

Fluxes add oxygen when they burn to create more uniform melting of the silica particles throughout the body of the ceramic. This increases the strength of the material. Common fluxing materials are calcium carbonate, alkaline feldspars, manganese, and iron oxides. Grog is used to prevent shrinking and provide structure for the fine clay matrix.

=== Causes of failure ===
The most common reasons for terracotta to fail are: poor manufacturing, improper installation, weathering, freeze/thaw cycling, and salt formation from atmospheric pollution.

==== Porosity ====
The porosity of terracotta greatly impacts its performance. The ability or inability for water and pollutants to enter into the material is directly correlated to its structural capacity. Terracotta is very strong in compression but weak in tension and shear strength. Any anomalous material expanding (ice, salts, incompatible fill material, or corroding metal anchors which cause rust jacking) inside the clay body will cause it to crack and eventually spall.

==== Improper molding ====
Inherent faults can severely impact the performance of the material. Improper molding can cause air pockets to form that increase the rate of deterioration. If the block is not fired or cooled properly then the fireskin will not be uniformly adhered to the substrate and can flake off. Likewise, if a glaze is not fired properly it will crack, flake, and fall off. Discolorations can result from mineral impurities such as pyrites or barium carbonates.

==== Handling defects ====
A fair amount of damage comes from clumsy transportation, storage, or installation of the material. If the mortar used around and inside the blocks is too strong then the stress will be translated to the terracotta block which will fail over time. Corroding interior metal anchors expand at a faster rate than the surrounding ceramic body causing it to fail from the inside out. Improper loading of the hollow terracotta blocks can create stress cracks.

==== Flawed repairs ====
Imperfect repair work often exacerbates the underlying problems, speeding up the decay of surrounding elements as well. Making penetrations in terracotta units to attach objects to the outside walls also allows moisture to enter the system, and often crack the terracotta as well. Installing sealant rather than mortar, or applying impervious coating, will trap moisture within the terracotta.

==== Air pollution ====
The environment also plays a large role in the survival of terracotta. Different types of air pollution can cause different types of surface problems. When it rains, water and salts get sucked into the voids in and around the terracotta through capillary action. If it freezes then ice forms, putting internal stress on the material, causing it to crack from inside. A similar problem happens with atmospheric pollutants that are carried into the gaps by rains water. The pollution creates a mildly acidic solution that eats at the clay body or a salt crust forms, causing similar issues as ice.

==== Consequences of failure ====
With the majority of terracotta buildings being over one-hundred years old, failing terracotta has become a problem in many cities such as New York. Regular inspections and maintenance and repair programs are required by law, but nonetheless well-publicized incidents such as the death of Erica Tishman after a piece of terracotta fell from a 105-year-old building.

== Manufacturers ==
=== Britain ===
- Royal Doulton (1815 to present)
- Fambrini & Daniels (1838 to 1913)
- John Marriott Blashfield (1839 to 1878)
- Gibbs and Canning (1847 to 1950s)
- Burmantofts Pottery (1859 to 1957)
- Shaws of Darwen (1897 to 2014)
- Darwen Terracotta and Faience (2014–present)

=== United States ===
- Henry Tolman Jr. (1848 to 1855)
- Chicago Terra Cotta Works (1868 to 1880)
- Gladding, McBean (1879 to present)
- Perth Amboy Terra Cotta Company (1879 to 1907)
- Boston Terra Cotta Company (1880 to 1893)
- A. Hall Terra Cotta Company (1883 to 1887)
- New York Architectural Terra-Cotta Company (1886 to 1929)
- Los Angeles Pressed Brick Company (1887 to 1916)
- Northwestern Terra Cotta Company (1888 to 1954)
- Celadon Terra Cotta Company (1888 to 1906)
- New Jersey Terra Cotta Company (1888 to 1928)
- South Amboy Terra Cotta Company (1903 to 1928)
- Denny-Renton Clay and Coal Company (1905 to 1927)
- O.W. Ketcham Terra Cotta Works (1906 to 1995)
- Ludowici-Celadon Company (1906 to present)
- Atlantic Terra Cotta Company (1907 to 1943)
- Federal Terra Cotta Company (1909 to 1928)
- Moravian Pottery and Tile Works (1912 to present)
- Federal Seaboard Terra Cotta Corporation (1928 to 1968)
- Boston Valley Terra Cotta (1981 to present)

== Bibliography ==
- Barr, Emily. "PRESSING ISSUES IN-KIND TERRA COTTA REPLACEMENT IN THE 21ST CENTURY." Masters of Science Thesis. Columbia University. 2014
- Dillon M. (1985) Bricks, Tiles and Terracotta, An Exhibition on one of the major industries of the Wrexham area, (Held at the Grosvenor Museum, Chester), 24pp.
- Didden, Amanda. "Standardization of terracotta anchorage: an analysis of shop drawings from the Northwestern Terra Cotta Company and the O.W. Ketcham Terra Cotta Works." Masters Thesis, University of Pennsylvania, 2003.
- Fidler, John. The Conservation of Architectural Terracotta and Faience. Transactions of the Association for Studies in the Conservation of Historic Buildings, no. 6(1981):3-16.
- Fidler, John. Fragile Remains. Architectural Ceramics: their History, Manufacture and Conservation. London: James and James, 1996.
- Friedman, Donald (2001). "Anchoring Systems for Architectural Terra Cotta in Curtain-Wall Construction". APT Bulletin. 32 (4): 17–21. doi:10.2307/1504768. JSTOR 1504768.
- Gerns, Edward and Joshua Freedland. "Understanding terra-cotta distress: Evaluation and repair approaches." Journal of Building Appraisal. October 2006.
- James W P Campbell & Will Pryce, (2003) Brick: A World History, ISBN 0-500-34195-8
- Jenkins, Moses. "Terracotta and Faience." Historic Scotland, Longmore House.
- Mack, Robert C. "The Manufacture and Use of Architectural Terra Cotta in the United States." In The Technology of Historic American Buildings, edited by H. Ward Jandl, 117–51. Washington, D.C.: Foundation for Preservation Technology, 1983.
- National Terra Cotta Society (1927). Terra Cotta Standard Construction (PDF) (Revised ed.).
- Ries, Heinrich and Henry Leighton. History of the Clay Working Industry in the United States. New York: John Wiley, 1909.
- Searls, Carolyn L.; Louie, Cece (2001). "The Good, the Bad and the Ugly: Twenty Years of Terra-Cotta Repairs Reexamined". APT Bulletin. 32 (4). Association for Preservation Technology International: 29–36. doi:10.2307/1504770. JSTOR 1504770.
- Stratton, M. (1993) The Terracotta Revival : Building Innovation and the Image of the Industrial City in Britain and North America. London : Gollancz.
- Taylor, James. Terra Cotta. Architectural Record, Vol. 1(July 1891-July 1892):63-68.
- Taylor, James. "History of Terra Cotta in New York City." Architectural Record 2 July 1892-July 1893:136-148.
- Tindall, Susan M. (1989). "How to Prepare Project-Specific Terra-Cotta Specifications". APT Bulletin. 21 (1). Association for Preservation Technology International: 26–36. doi:10.2307/1504220. JSTOR 1504220.
- Tindall, Susan M. (1988). "Terra Cotta Replacement". APT Bulletin. 20 (3). Association for Preservation Technology International: 12–14. doi:10.2307/1504198. JSTOR 1504198.
- Turner, Susan D. (Summer 2005). "Repairing Architectural Terra Cotta" (PDF). Heritage Matters.
- Wells, Jeremy C. History of Structural Hollow Clay Tile in the United States
- Construction History, Vol. 22 (2007):27-46.
