= List of people from King's Lynn =

This is a non-exhaustive list of the Wikipedia pages of notable people born or educated in King's Lynn, or prominent there or nationally.

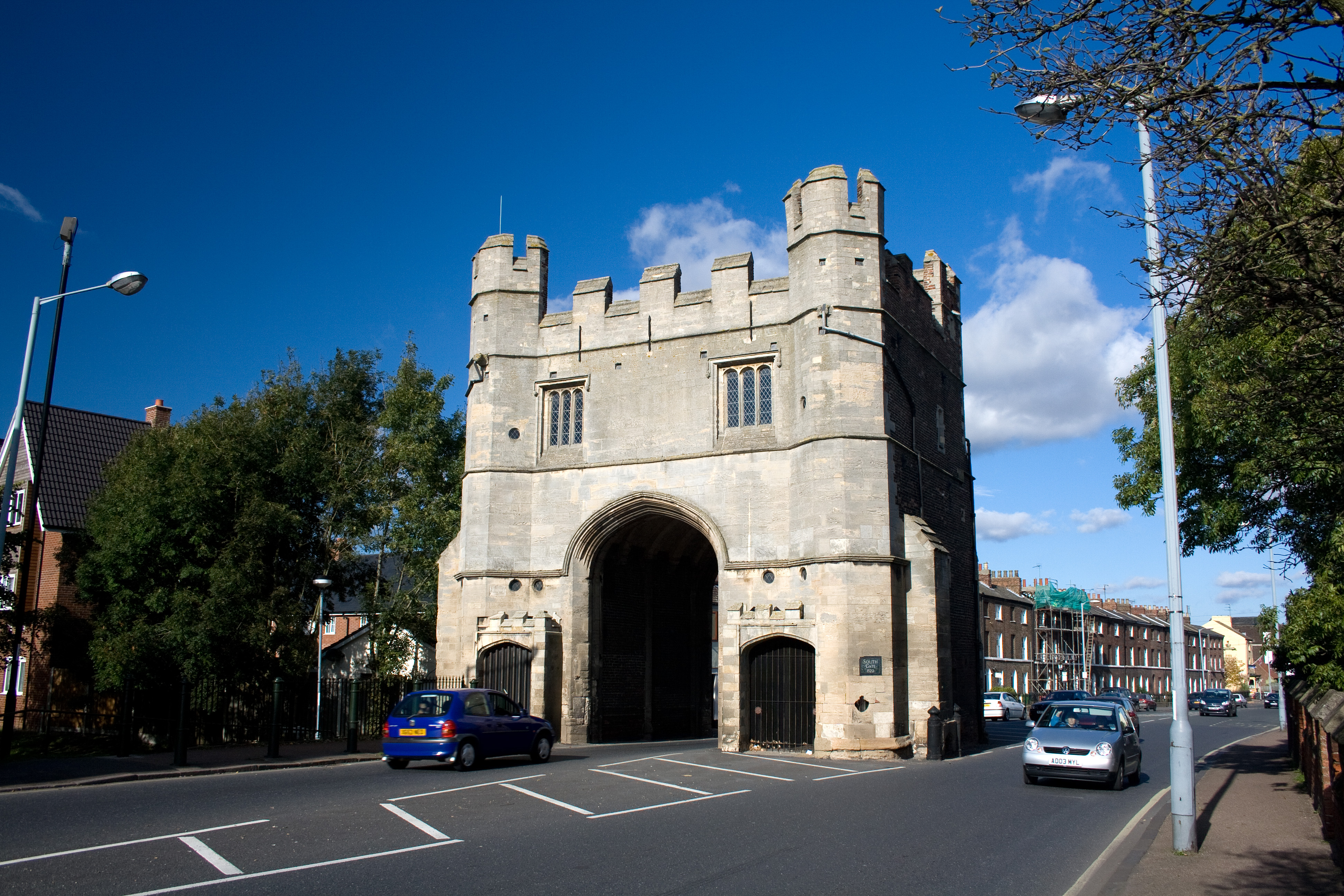
The South Gate

== Armed forces ==
- Florence Green (1901–2012), last known female veteran of World War I
- John Mason (1586–1635), naval captain and coloniser

== Entertainment ==
- Robert Armin (c. 1563–1615), actor
- Mrs. Bernard Beere (1851–1915), actress
- Victoria Bush (born 1978), actress and comedian
- Michael Caine (born 1933), actor, was evacuated to King's Lynn in World War II and attended King Edward VII School.
- Zara Dawson (born 1983), actress and television presenter
- Richard Meek (born 1982), actor in musical theatre
- Miranda Raison (born 1977), actress
- Lucy Verasamy (born 1980), weather forecaster, currently employed by ITV National Weather
- Mark Wheat (living), presenter on The Current from Minnesota Public Radio

== Exploration ==
- Adam Thoroughgood (1604–1640), colonist and community leader in the Colony of Virginia
- George Vancouver (1757–1798), naval officer known for exploring North-West Coast of North America
- John Smith (explorer) (c. 1580–1631), Admiral of New England and English soldier, explorer and author
- Thomas Baines (1820–1875), artist and explorer of British colonial southern Africa and Australia
- Samuel Gurney Cresswell (1827–1867), first naval officer to cross the entire Northwest Passage

== Fine art ==
- Odile Crick (1920–2007), artist and illustrator
- Walter Dexter (1876–1958), oil painter and water colourist
- Alison Dunhill (born 1950), artist, art historian and poet
- Robert Elwes (1818–1878), painter and traveller
- Ruth Roche, Baroness Fermoy (1908–1993), founder of King's Lynn Festival of Arts
- Samuel Lane (1780–1859), portrait painter
- Edward Villiers Rippingille (c. 1790–1859), oil painter and water colourist

== Literature and journalism ==
- Emily Bell (born 1965), journalist and academic
- Frances Burney (1752–1840), novelist and diarist
- James Burney (1750–1821), naval historian
- Sarah Burney (1772–1844), novelist
- Suzanne Francis (born 1959), scifi and fantasy author
- Ian Hamilton (1938–2001), critic, biographer and poet
- Hardiman Scott (1920–1999), crime writer, poet and broadcaster
- John Timpson (1928–2005), journalist and broadcaster

== Miscellaneous ==
- Michael Carroll (lottery winner) (born 1983), binman who won £9.7 million on the UK National Lottery in 2002

== Music ==
- Charles Burney (1726–1814), organist in King's Lynn, composer and musicologist
- Gerry Conway (musician) (born 1952), folk and rock drummer and percussionist
- Clara Dow (1883–1969), operatic soprano
- Pieter Hellendaal (1721–1799), organist in King's Lynn, composer and violinist
- George Kiallmark (1781–1835), violinist and composer
- Roger Taylor (born 1949), drummer for the rock band Queen
- David Thaxton (born 1982), singer and actor
- Craig Powell (musician) (born 1984), singer/songwriter

== Politics and diplomacy ==
- Denys Bullard (1912–1994), Conservative politician and agriculturalist
- Thomas Cromwell (Parliamentary diarist) (c. 1540 – c. 1611), politician and parliamentary diarist
- Maurice Roche, 4th Baron Fermoy (1885–1955), Conservative politician
- Sir William ffolkes, 3rd Baronet (1847–1912), Liberal politician
- Holcombe Ingleby (1854–1926), Conservative politician and mayor
- Weston Jarvis (1855–1939), Conservative politician and army officer
- Clare Sewell Read (1826–1905), Conservative politician and agriculturalist
- George Ridley (1886–1944), Labour politician
- Oliver Simmonds (1897–1975), Conservative politician and aircraft engineer
- Sir Robert Walpole (1676–1745), Whig statesman generally regarded as Britain's first prime minister
- Graham Woodwark (1874–1938), Liberal politician and mayor

== Religion ==
- John Arrowsmith (scholar) (1602–1659), theologian and academic
- John Barret (theologian) (died 1563), Lynn's "Vicar of Bray", Carmelite friar, then Protestant cleric and theologian
- John Capgrave (1393–1464), hagiographer and scholastic theologian
- Harvey Goodwin (1818–1891), bishop and academic
- William Gurnall (1616–1679), religious writer
- Margery Kempe (c. 1373 – after 1438), mystic and pilgrim, author of possibly the earliest autobiography in English
- Thomas Pyle (1674–1756), cleric and controversialist
- William Richards (minister) (1749–1818), Baptist minister and local historian

== Science and scholarship ==
- Eugene Aram (1704–1759), philologist and murderer
- William Baly (1814–1861), physician and fellow of the Royal Society
- Henry Bell (architect) (1647–1711), architect and mayor
- G. G. Coulton (1858–1947), historian
- Guy Dawber (1861–1938), Arts and Crafts-style architect
- Charles Wycliffe Goodwin (1817–1887), Egyptologist and judge
- Francis Goodwin (architect) (1784–1835), architect
- John Harvey (astrologer) (1564–1592), physician and astrologer
- Charles Edward Hubbard (1900–1980), botanist and world authority on grasses
- Benjamin Keene (1697–1757), ambassador
- George William Manby (1765–1854), inventor and author
- Tom Petch (1870–1948), mycologist and plant pathologist
- Simon Thurley (born 1962), academic and architectural historian
- Charles Vancouver (c. 1756 – c. 1815), writer on agriculture

== Sport ==
- George Russell (racing driver) (born 1998), racing driver for Mercedes-AMG Petronas Formula One Team
- George North - Professional rugby player
- Ali Price - Professional rugby player
- Martin Brundle (born 1959), racing driver and F1 commentator for ITV Sport and the BBC
- Fred Fayers, (1890–1954), international football player
- Lewis Jarvis, (1857–1938), all-round athlete and banker
- Kathryn Johnson (field hockey Britain) (born 1967), Olympic field hockey player
- Nicholas "Nick" Aldis (known professionally as Magnus (wrestler)) (born 1986), professional wrestler and actor
- Peter Parfitt (born 1936), test cricketer
- Barbara Parker (athlete), Olympic track and field athlete
- Lucy Pearson (cricketer), test cricketer
- Martin Saggers (born 1972), test cricketer
- James Sherlock (golfer) (1875–1966), Open Championship golfer
- Helen Slatter (born 1970), Olympic swimmer
- Dave Taylor (wrestler) (born 1957), champion wrestler
- Stan Worthington (1905–1973), test cricketer

== See also ==
- List of buildings in King's Lynn
- List of events in King's Lynn
