= Duke's Head Hotel, King's Lynn =

Duke's Head Hotel
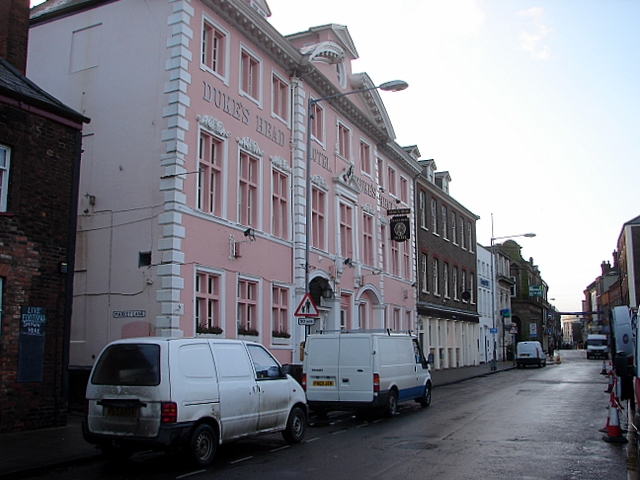
- The Duke's Head Hotel

- Norfolk

General information
- Location: King's Lynn, King's Lynn and West Norfolk, Norfolk, England, Tuesday Market Place; Kings Lynn; Norfolk; PE30 1JS; United Kingdom
- Coordinates: 52°45′21.85″N 0°23′42.31″E
- Opening: Built in 1683

Technical details
- Floor count: 4 (connecting lift)

Design and construction
- Architect: attributed to Henry Bell

Other information
- Number of rooms: 81 en-suite bedrooms
- Number of suites: 3 conferencing suites
- Number of restaurants: 1 (Turners Restaurant)
- Number of bars: 2 (Massey & Co/Function Bar)
- Parking: Yes, but limited

Website
- Hotel Website

Listed Building – Grade II
- Designated: 1 December 1951
- Reference no.: 1212229

The Duke's Head Hotel is a 4 star hotel in the English town of King's Lynn within the county of Norfolk in the United Kingdom. The hotel has been a grade II listed building since 1 December 1951.

== Location ==
The hotel is situated in the centre of King's Lynn and is on the eastern side of Tuesday Market Place. It is 0.7 miles (1.1 km) west of King's Lynn railway station. The hotel is 44.0 miles (70.8 km) west of the city of Norwich. The nearest airport is also at Norwich and that is 44.5 miles (71.6 km) west of the hotel.

== History ==
The Duke's Head was built in 1683 for a King's Lynn Member of Parliament, Sir John Turner, and is attributed to the King's Lynn architect Henry Bell. Bell designed and built many buildings in King's Lynn and Norfolk including the Customs House in King's Lynn.

The Duke's Head in the 1930s was noted for its excellent English cuisine, appearing in Florence White's guidebook, Where Shall We Eat or Put Up? in England, Wales, Scotland and Ireland. A contributor to the guidebook, identified as a friend of Florence White's, wrote: "My husband and I had dinner there this Whitsun and were very much struck by the excellence of the menu. I cannot remember each course, but do most certainly recollect the excellent tiny asparagus served with the roast duke--quite evidently that afternoon's gathering from the hotel or nearby garden, and also the general 'Englishness' of the whole meal, ending with really good cheese."

After World War II, however, the hotel went into some state of decline. It became part of Trust House Forte when Trust Houses Ltd. merged with Forte Holdings in 1970. One of the most infamous recollections of the state of the hotel and the quality of its food comes in a July 18 1971 letter that poet Philip Larkin wrote to novelist Barbara Pym. "One forgets that nobody stays in hotels these days except businessmen and American tourists: the food is geared to the business lunch or the steak-platter trade: portion control is rampant, and the material cheap anyway. . . . The presence of the hotel in the Good Food Guide is nothing short of a farce. Of course it's a Trust House, which guarantees a kind of depersonalized dullness. Never stay at a Trust House,' Larkin warns.

== Ghostly manifestations ==
The Duke's Head is reputedly haunted. It stands on the site of an ancient inn called the Gryffin. There is a red lady who is thought to be a haunting manifestation of a woman who killed herself over her two lovers. There is also a ghostly maid servant who was executed in Tuesday Market Place for poisoning her mistress.
