= Corn Exchange, King's Lynn =

Commercial building in King's Lynn, England

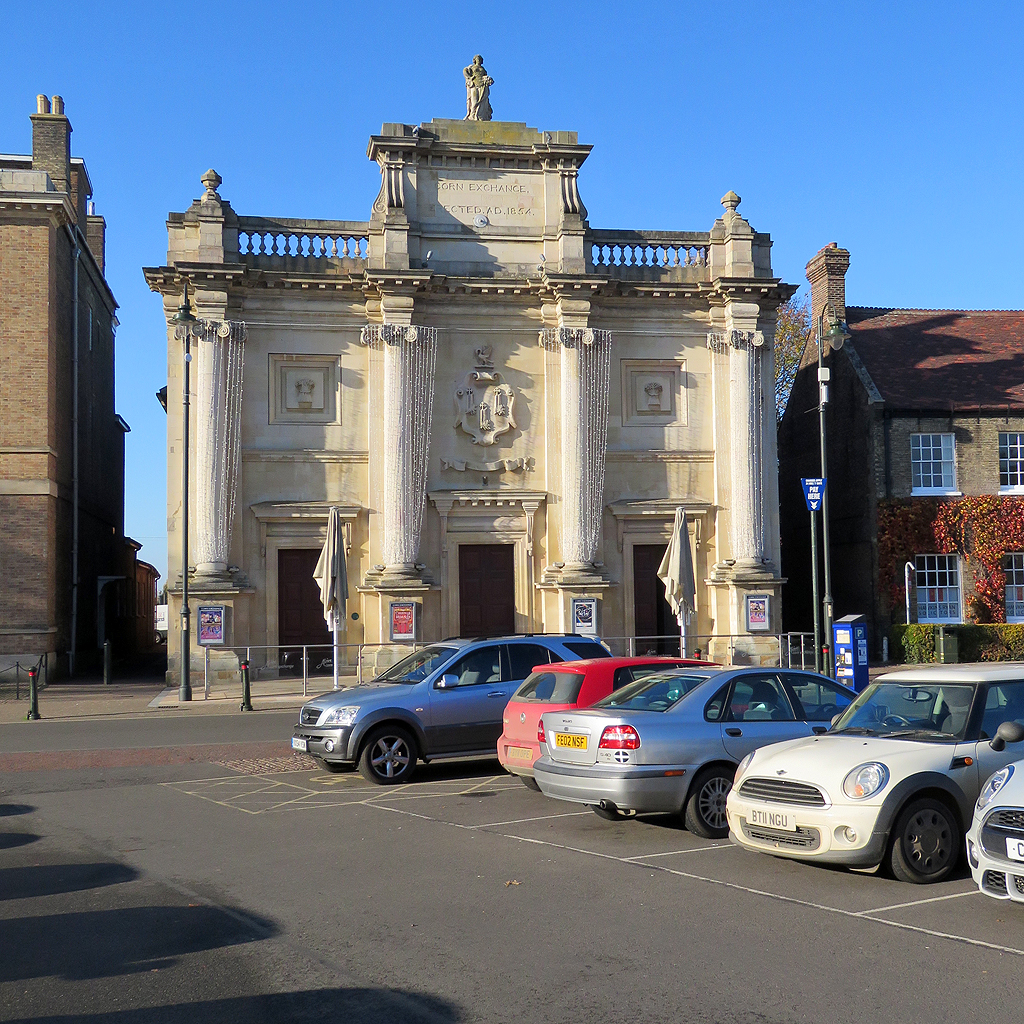
- Corn Exchange, King's Lynn

- Shown in Norfolk
- 52.7564°N 0.3935°E
- Location: Tuesday Market Place, King's Lynn

History
- Built: 1854

Site notes
- Architect(s): Frederick Haydon Cruso and Alfred William Maberley
- Architectural style: Baroque style

Listed Building – Grade II
- Official name: Corn Exchange
- Designated: 1 December 1951
- Reference no.: 1212488

The Corn Exchange is a commercial building in Tuesday Market Place, King's Lynn, Norfolk, England. The structure, which was commissioned as a corn exchange and is now used as an events venue, is a Grade II listed building.

== History ==
Until the mid-19th century, corn merchants in the town traded their goods in the open, with sacks piled in the paved area around the market cross. The market cross, which had become unstable, was demolished in 1830. In the mid-19th century, the civic leaders in King's Lynn decided to commission a purpose-built corn exchange: the site they selected had been occupied by Angel Inn in the 18th century and then by a market house, with butchers' stalls on the ground floor and a concert hall on the first floor, from 1834.

The current building was designed by Frederick Haydon Cruso and Alfred William Maberley in the Baroque style, built in ashlar stone and was completed in 1854. The design involved a symmetrical main frontage of three bays facing onto Tuesday Market Place. The central bay featured a doorway with an architrave, a frieze and a cornice supported by brackets on the ground floor, and a panel containing a carved borough coat of arms on the first floor. The outer bays contained similar doorways on the ground floor and panels containing carved sheafs of corn on the first floor. The bays were flanked by full-height Ionic order columns supporting a modillioned cornice and a balustraded parapet. At roof level, there was a central panel carved with the words "Corn Exchange Erected 1854" and surmounted by a statue of the goddess, Ceres. The architectural historian, Nikolaus Pevsner, described the design as "jolly and vulgar".

The use of the building as a corn exchange declined significantly in the wake of the Great Depression of British Agriculture in the late 19th century. Instead, it became a community events venue, but the condition of the building declined significantly during the 1980s. After an extensive programme of refurbishment works costing £4.4 million to a design by Levitt Bernstein Associates in the mid-1990s, the building was re-opened as an events and concert venue in 1996. A new glass roof incorporated blinds designed by Sharon Ting depicting local history. Subsequent performers included the musician, Midge Ure, (formerly a member of Ultravox) in May 2005 and the musician, Ian Anderson, (formerly leader of the rock band Jethro Tull) in September 2009.

A further programme of works to convert the foyer on the first floor into a two-screen cinema was completed at a cost of £1.6 million in September 2020.

== See also ==
- Corn exchanges in England
