= Guildhall of St George =

Grade I listed building in King's Lynn, Norfolk, England

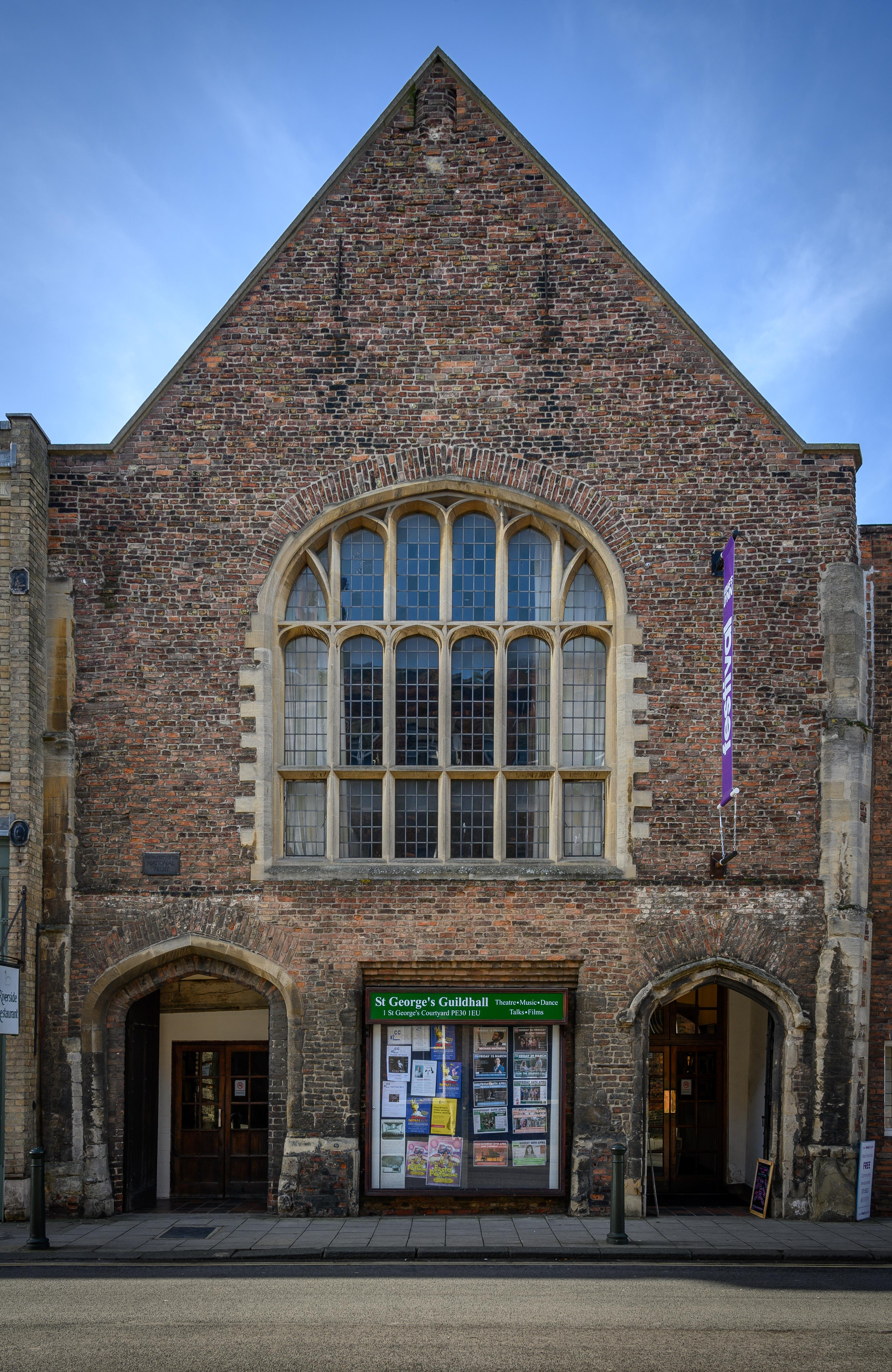
- The oldest theatre in the United Kingdom

- Location in Norfolk, England Guildhall of St George (the United Kingdom)
- 52.7555°N 0.3934°E
- Type: Guildhall, Theatre
- Location: Kings Lynn, Norfolk, England

History
- Built: 1410–1420

Listed Building – Grade I
- Official name: Guildhall of St George
- Designated: 1 December 1951
- Reference no.: 1290960

The Guildhall of St George is a Grade I listed building in King's Lynn, Norfolk, England. The Guild of St George was founded in 1376 and constructed the Guildhall between 1410 and 1420. It is the largest extant guildhall in England. It has been in use as a theatre since 1445, making it the oldest theatre still operating in the United Kingdom, and the only one still in existence in which William Shakespeare is believed to have performed. The building is in the ownership of the National Trust, which has leased it to King's Lynn and West Norfolk borough council for hire as a music, performances, lectures and entertainment venue.

== History ==
=== Foundation ===
The guildhall was created for the Guild of St George at the beginning of the 15th century. In 1406 the Guild of St George, founded in 1376, acquired re-claimed land on the bank of the River Great Ouse to build its hall. Constructed between 1410 and 1420, the hall was in use by 1428. In about 1500 the structure was strengthened by the addition of buttresses along the north wall.

Following the Dissolution of the Guilds in 1547 control of the guildhall passed to the Lynn Corporation which retained ownership until 1814. In the late 17th century the brick-vaulted wine cellar was made in the undercroft, and access to this was continued under the later warehouses towards the river. The hall continued to serve as a theatre and public hall, as well as a court house, a school, and as a munitions store during the English Civil War.

=== England's oldest theatre: 1445–1814 ===
The earliest record of a theatrical production is of a nativity play before a Guild feast in January 1445 featuring William, the barber in Grassmarket, and Richard Comber. The Guild regularly staged theatricals, including a procession on St George's Day which took place until 1546. After the Dissolution it was used by companies of players; the Queen's Players performed regularly between 1585 and 1595. Recent academic research by Professor Matthew Woodcock, at the University of East Anglia, has supported the local tradition that William Shakespeare played at the guildhall with the Earl of Pembroke's Men in 1593 when London theatres were closed by the plague. It is the only theatre left in England where Shakespeare is believed to have performed. (Note: There is considerable evidence to support the claim that Shakespeare performed at St George's Guildhall but it is not definitive.) Shakespeare's leading comic actor, Robert Armin, was born in King's Lynn in 1565, the family living in what is now 78 High Street. Armin was the first Feste in Twelfth Night, Autolycus in A Winter's Tale and the Fool in King Lear, and is credited with being a major influence on Shakespeare.

In the 17th century players continued to use the guildhall until the prohibition on plays imposed during the Commonwealth. Theatricals resumed after the Restoration in 1660. The success of the playhouse led to the construction of the Theatre Royal in the town in 1813, and in 1814 the guildhall was sold. It was resold in 1826 to the Everards, a family of merchants who converted it into a warehouse.

=== 20th and 21st centuries ===
In 1920 the Everard family sold the hall for £2,650 to G.M. Bridges and Son Ltd., theatrical set designers. Successful in the Victorian and Edwardian eras, and gaining Royal warrants for their work at Sandringham House, the business declined with the advent of cinema. By 1946 the guildhall was derelict and scheduled for demolition. It was purchased by Alexander Penrose, son of J. Doyle Penrose, who converted it to an arts centre. The building was restored 1948–51 by Marshall Sisson and vested in the National Trust. In 1951 the St George's Arts Trust took a long lease. The centre was opened by Queen Elizabeth The Queen Mother, for the first King's Lynn Festival on 24 July of that year.

Warehouses which form the building's courtyard were converted to galleries in 1963 by Lady Fermoy (lady-in-waiting to the Queen Mother) in memory of her husband, Lord Fermoy, who had served as mayor of King's Lynn and as its member of parliament. In 1993 the Borough Council took over the lease. Between 2011 and 2016 King's Lynn Arts Centre Trust managed the galleries. In 2019 the National Trust, King's Lynn and West Norfolk Borough Council and the newly formed Shakespeare's Guildhall Trust formed a group to undertake redevelopment of the site. Although the Guildhall Trust was subsequently wound up, the remaining members of the group continued with planning.

Everyone interested in Shakespeare and in the theatres of his time must feel a thrill of excitement at the discovery of the only surviving boards on which he is likely to have performed

— Sir Stanley Wells, President of the Shakespeare Birthplace Trust, on the discovery of the medieval stage.

In 2019 the guildhall was declared the priority project of the Town Deal for King's Lynn and a development plan for the area was finalised. On 5 January each year, the theatre commemorates the anniversary of the first recorded performance there in 1445. In 2022 Tim FitzHigham was made Creative Director for the site. In 2023 the council appointed Haworth Tompkins, an architectural practice with experience in the redevelopment of historic theatres, to lead a redevelopment of the guildhall to create a cultural centre with a Shakespearean theatre as its centrepiece. Work is due for completion in 2026.

During renovations in 2023, a wooden floor was uncovered which the theatre considers was likely the flooring in place when Shakespeare performed there in 1592–93. Tree-ring dating and a survey of how the building was assembled date the floor boards to between 1417 and 1430. It survived under a later floor. In August 2024, a 600-year-old doorway, thought to be the entrance to a dressing room once used by Shakespeare, was discovered when two noticeboards and layers of plasterboard were removed from a wall on the ground floor.

== Architecture and description ==
The Guildhall of St George is the largest surviving medieval guildhall in the country. It is a Grade I listed building. Built of brick, and of two storeys with a gable roof, its dimensions are 32.6 x 8.8 m (107 x 29 feet). The building occupies a long, narrow site which was once a burgage plot between King Street and the river. The theatre stands on the raised upper floor, above an undercroft. The roof is to a hammerbeam design.

== Gallery ==
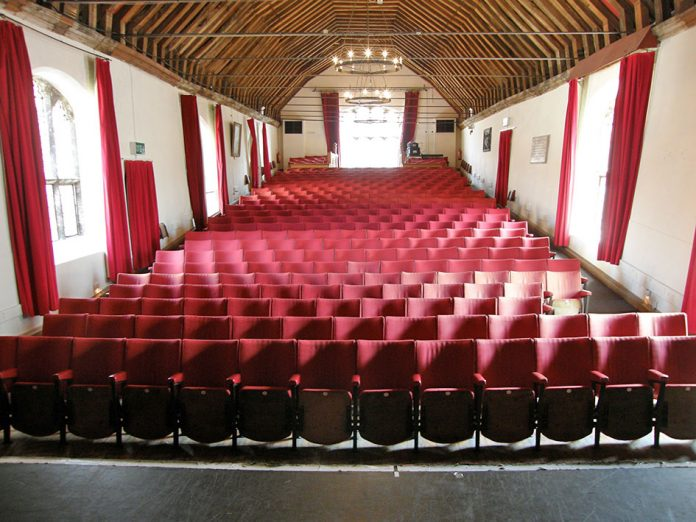
The original 15th-century wooden roof is visible inside the auditorium that once hosted Shakespeare

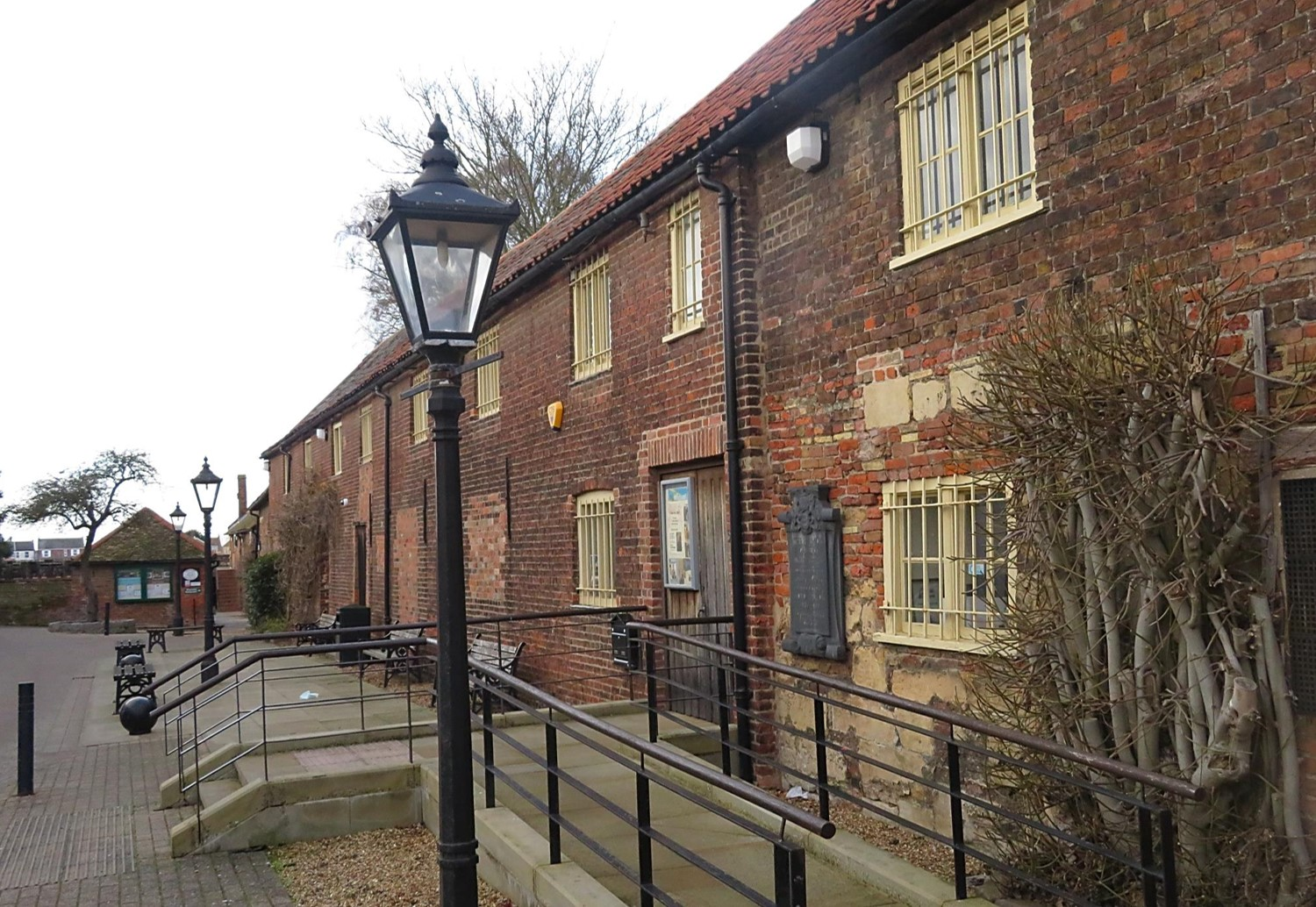
St George's Guildhall courtyard

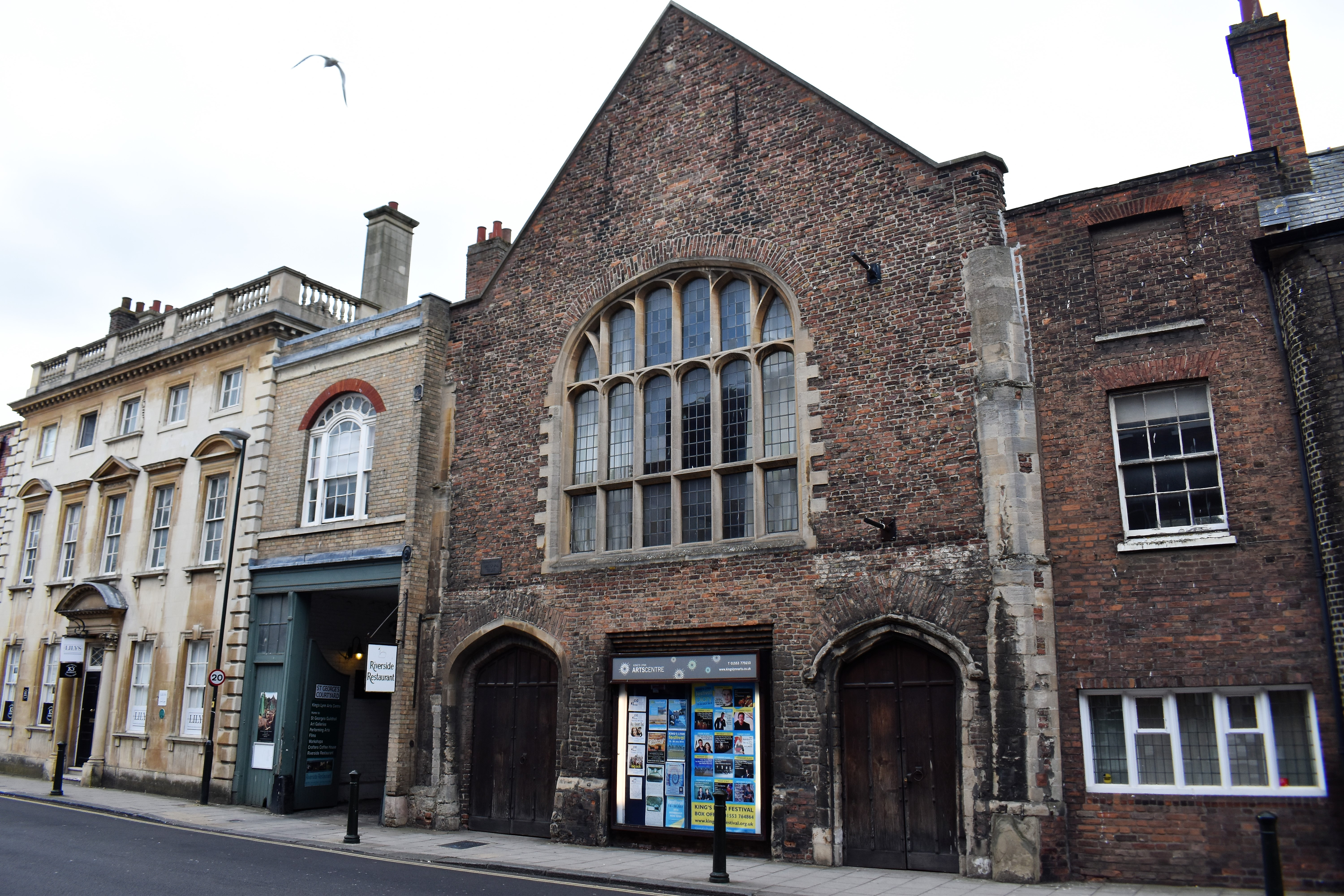
King Street frontage

== Sources ==
- Smith, Joshua Toulmin (1870). English Gilds. Early English Text Society.
