= King's Lynn =

Port and market town in Norfolk, England

Coordinates: 52.754°N 0.398°E

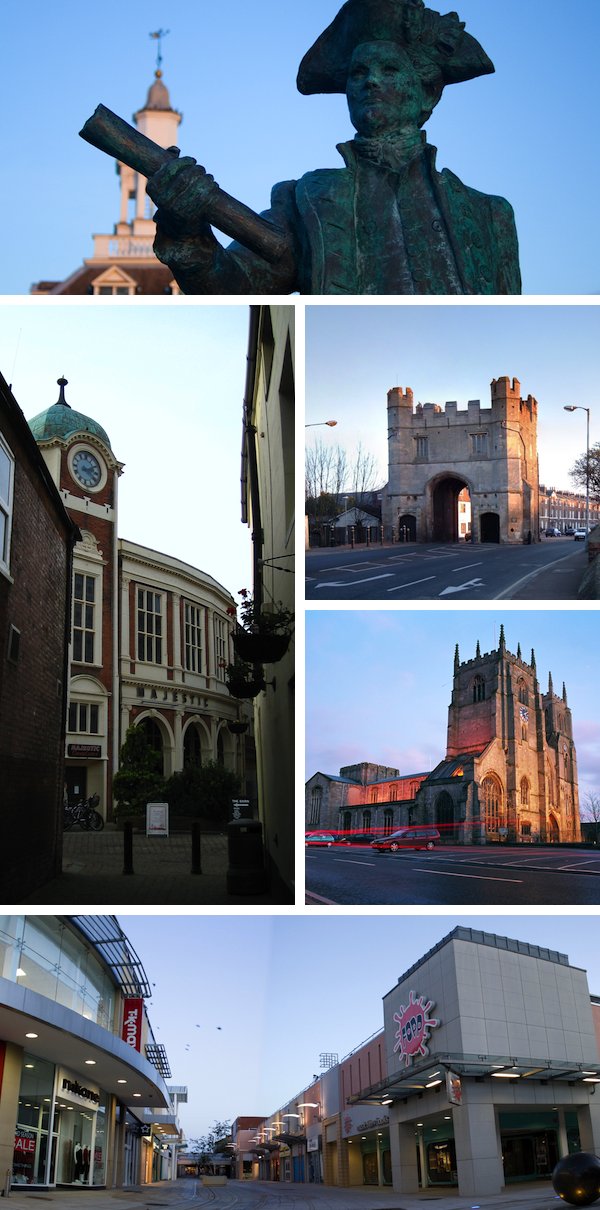

- Location within Norfolk
- Population: 47,610 (2021)
  - London: 98 miles (158 km)
- District: King's Lynn and West Norfolk
- Shire county: Norfolk
- Region: East
- Country: England
- Sovereign state: United Kingdom
- Post town: KING'S LYNN
- Postcode district: PE30
- Dialling code: 01553
- Police: Norfolk
- Fire: Norfolk
- Ambulance: East of England
- UK Parliament: North West Norfolk
- Website: www.west-norfolk.gov.uk

King's Lynn, known until 1537 as Bishop's Lynn and colloquially as Lynn, is a port and market town in the borough of King's Lynn and West Norfolk in the county of Norfolk, England. It is 36 miles (58 km) north-east of Peterborough, 44 miles (71 km) north-north-east of Cambridge, 44 miles (71 km) west of Norwich, and about 5 miles (8 km) inland from The Wash estuary. In 2021 it had a population of 47,610.

== History ==
=== Toponymy ===
The etymology of King's Lynn is uncertain. The name Lynn may signify a body of water near the town – the Welsh word llyn means a lake; but the name is plausibly of Anglo-Saxon origin, from lean meaning a tenure in fee or farm. The 1086 Domesday Book records it as Lun and Lenn, and ascribes it to the Bishop of Elmham and the Archbishop of Canterbury. The Domesday Book also mentions saltings at Lena (Lynn); an area of partitioned pools may have existed there at the time. The presence of salt, which was relatively rare and expensive in the early medieval period, may have added to the interest of Herbert de Losinga and other prominent Normans in the modest parish.

The town was named Len Episcopi (Bishop's Lynn) while under the temporal and spiritual jurisdiction of the Bishop of Norwich, but in the reign of Henry VIII it was surrendered to the crown and took the name Lenne Regis or King's Lynn. However, the town is generally known locally as Lynn.

Other places with Lynn in the name include Dublin, Ireland, with An Dubh Linn meaning "the Black Pool." The city of Lynn, Massachusetts, north of Boston, was named in 1637 in honour of its first official minister of religion, Reverend Samuel Whiting Sr, who arrived there from Lynn, Norfolk. Lynnhaven, Virginia is also named after King's Lynn having been named by Captain Adam Thoroughgood who hailed from King's Lynn.

=== Middle Ages ===
Lynn originated on a constricted site south of where the River Great Ouse now discharges into the Wash. Development began in the early 10th century, but the place was not recorded until the early 11th century. Until the early 13th century, the Great Ouse emptied via the Wellstream at Wisbech. After its redirection, Lynn and its port gained significance and prosperity.

In 1101, Bishop Herbert de Losinga of Thetford began to build the first medieval town between the rivers Purfleet to the north and Mill Fleet to the south. He commissioned St Margaret's Church and authorised a market to be held on Saturday. Trade built up along the waterways that stretched inland; the town expanded between the two rivers.

Lynn's 12th-century Jewish community was wiped out in the widespread massacres of 1189.

During the 14th century, Lynn ranked as England's most important port. It was seen to be as vital to England in the Middle Ages as Liverpool was during the Industrial Revolution. Sea trade with Europe was dominated by the Hanseatic League of ports; the transatlantic trade and the rise of England's western ports began only in the 17th century. The Trinity Guildhall was rebuilt in 1421 after a fire. Walls entered by the South Gate and East Gate were erected to protect the town. It retains two former Hanseatic League warehouses: Hanse House of 1475 and Marriott's Warehouse, in use between the 15th and 17th centuries. These are the only remaining buildings of the Hanseatic League in England. The town was designated a Royal Port by King John.

=== Modern ===
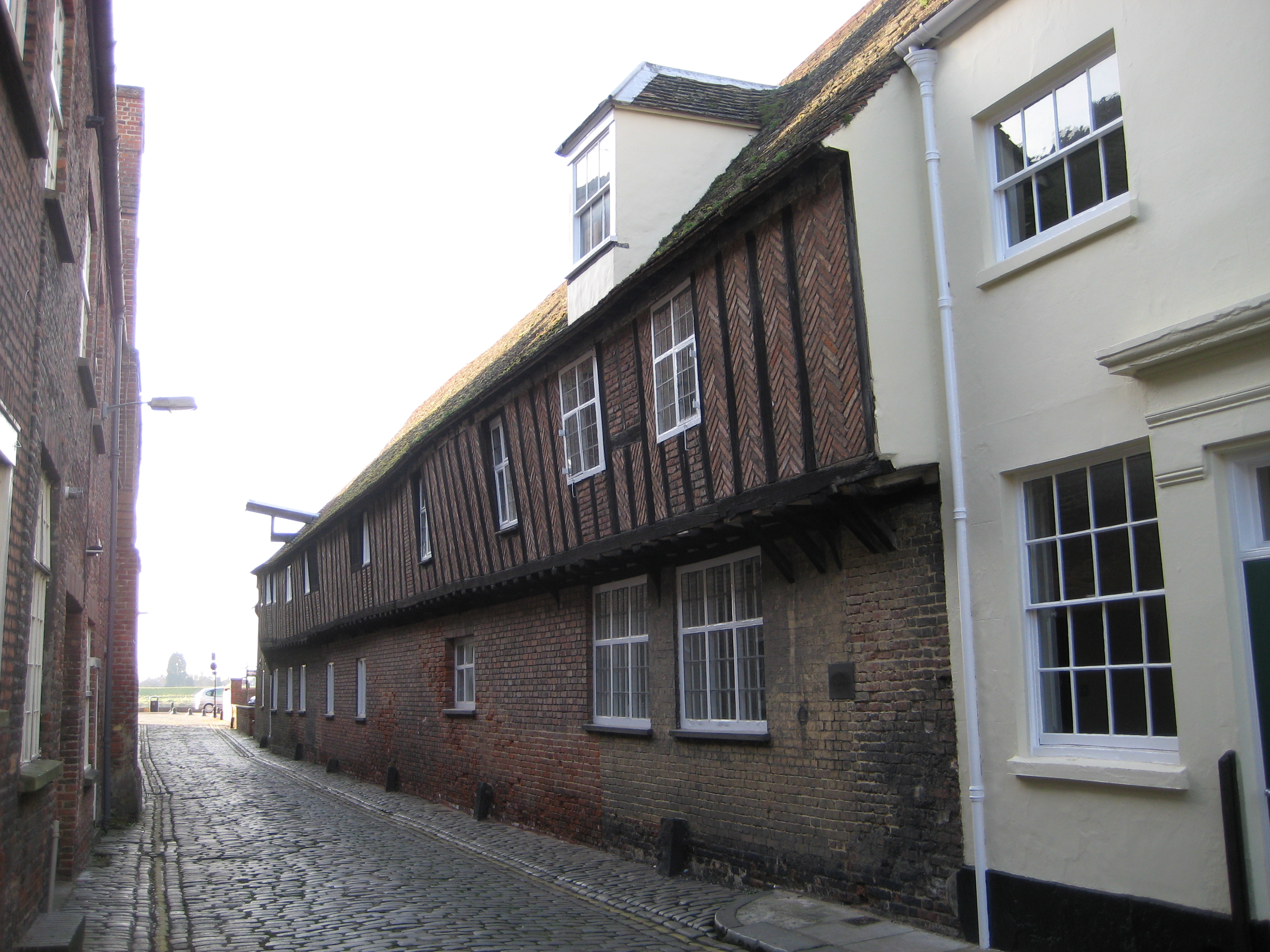
The 15th-century 'Hanse House' warehouse built by Hanseatic merchants in King's Lynn, reflecting the town's role in North Sea trade

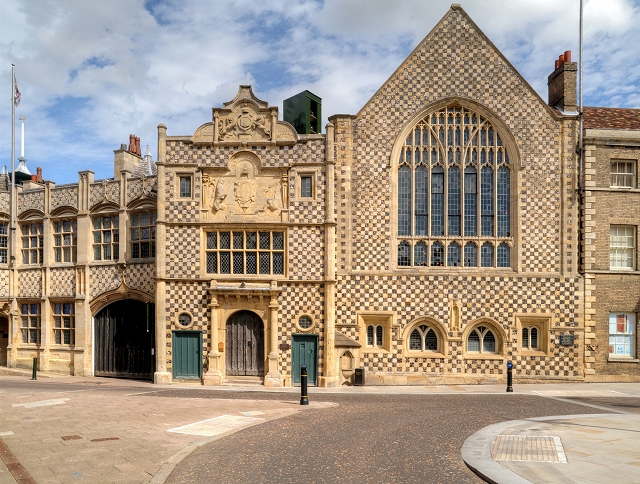
Trinity Guildhall (15th century), King's Lynn—one of England's oldest civic buildings, formerly housing both guild chambers and a prison

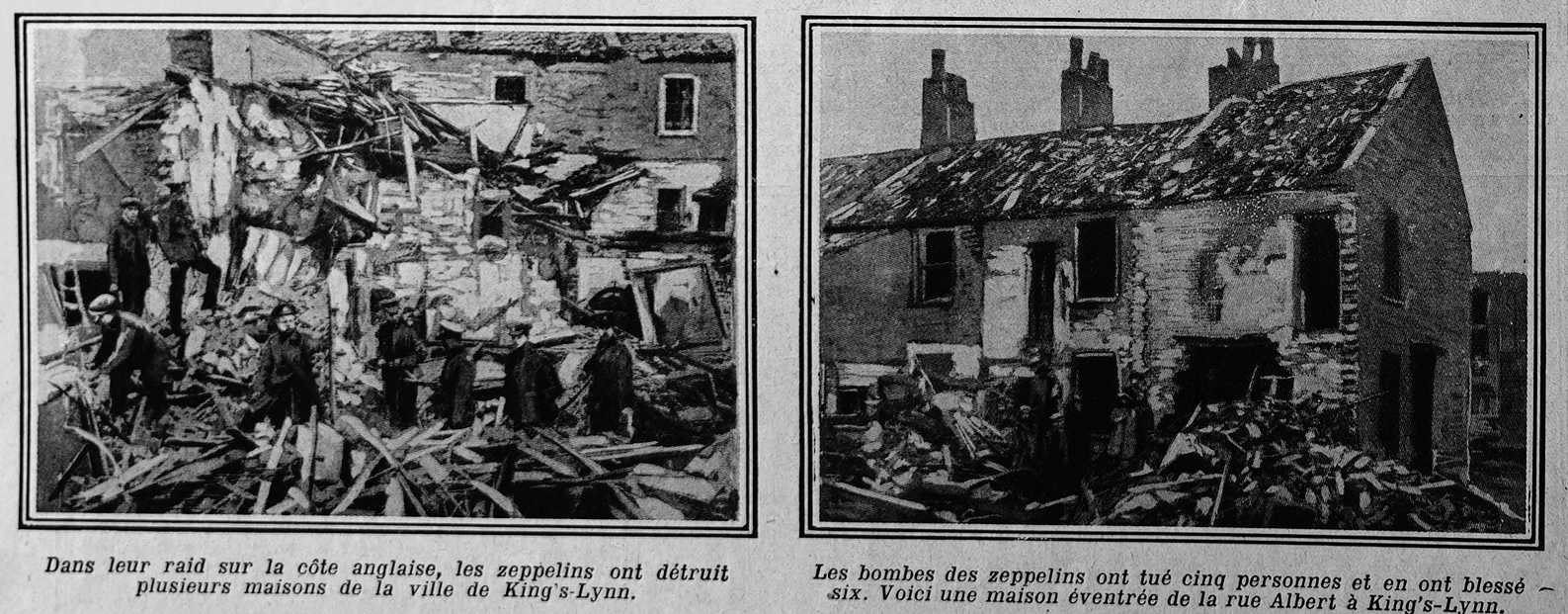
Damage from the 1915 aerial bombing during the First World War. On 19 January 1915, King's Lynn was bombed by the German Zeppelin L 4, with explosions striking Bentinck Street, Albert Street, and a field behind Tennyson Avenue—marking one of Britain's earliest civilian air raids

In the first decade of the 16th century, Thoresby College was built in Lynn by Thomas Thoresby to house priests of the Guild of the Holy Trinity. It had been incorporated in 1453 under a petition of its alderman, chaplain, four brethren and four sisters, who were licensed to found a chantry of chaplains for the altar of Holy Trinity in Wisbech. Lands were granted in mortmain. Lynn was granted a mayor and corporate status in 1524, formalising its municipal governance. In 1537, the town passed from episcopal control to the Crown, becoming known as King's Lynn. In the same century, the town's two annual fairs were reduced to one. In 1534, a grammar school was founded; four years later Henry VIII closed the Benedictine priory and the three friaries.

A piped water supply was created in the 16th century, although many could not afford to connect to the elm pipes carrying water under the streets. Lynn suffered from outbreaks of plague, notably in 1516, 1587, 1597, 1636 and finally in 1665. Fire was another hazard – in 1572, thatched roofs were banned to reduce the risk. In the English Civil War, King's Lynn supported Roundheads (Parliament), but in August 1643 it was in Cavalier (Royalist) hands. It changed sides again after Parliament sent an army, and the town was besieged for three weeks. Valentine Walton, brother-in-law of Oliver Cromwell, was appointed governor.

A carved heart on a wall in Tuesday Market Place is traditionally associated with the execution of an alleged witch in the late 16th or early 17th century. One version of the legend names Margaret Read, who was reportedly burned at the stake in 1590, during which her heart is said to have burst from her chest and struck the wall. Other accounts attribute the tale to Mary Smith, who was hanged for witchcraft in 1616.

The Tuesday Market Place had a long-standing role as a site of public executions, including both hangings and burnings, during the early modern period. Burning at the stake was particularly associated with women convicted of witchcraft, reflecting broader judicial practices in England at the time.

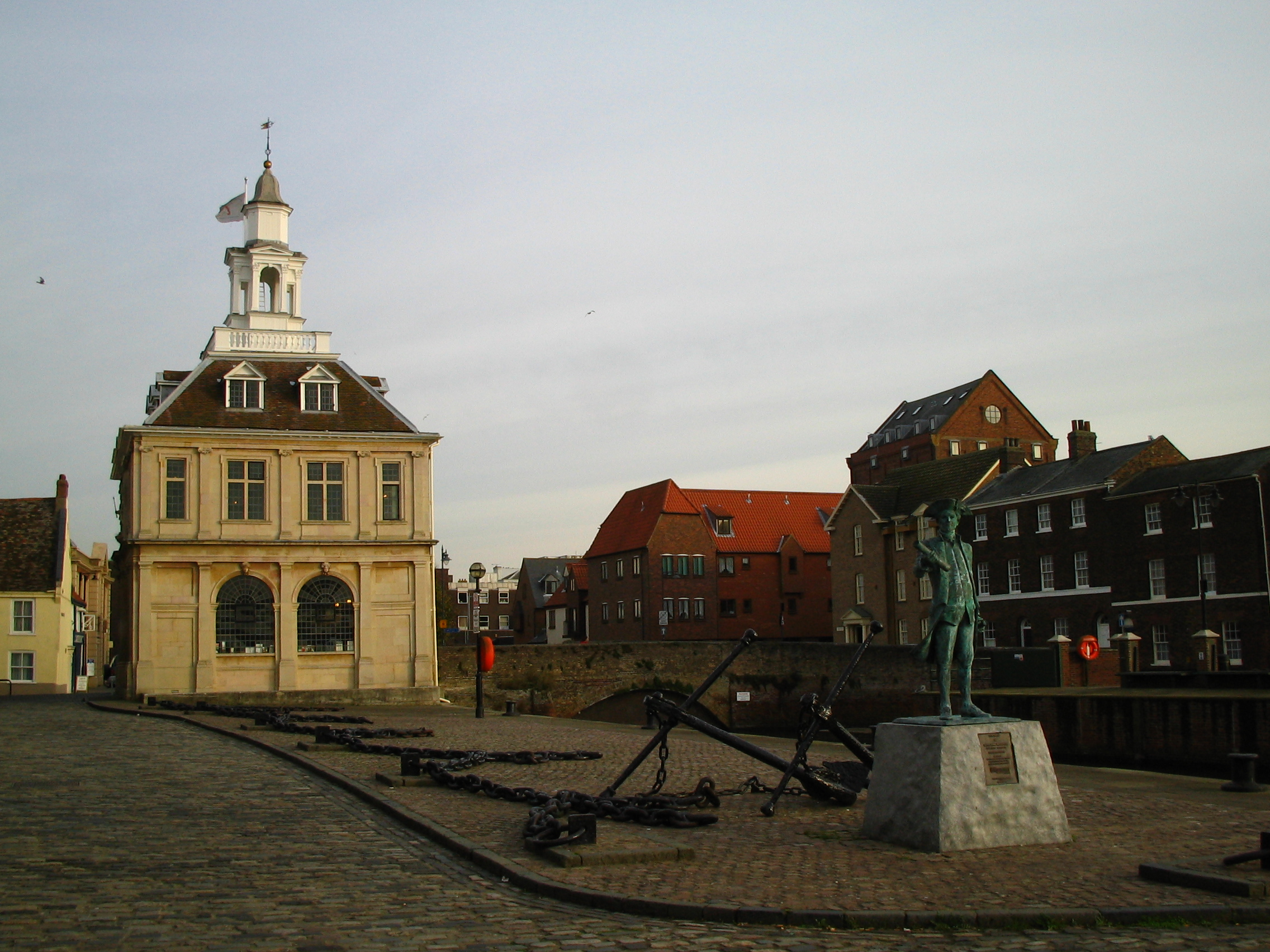
The 17th-century Custom House in King's Lynn, a landmark of Classical architecture designed by Henry Bell, associated with the town's maritime trade

In 1683, the architect Henry Bell, once the town's mayor, designed the Custom House. He also designed the Duke's Head Inn, North Runcton Church and Stanhoe Hall, having gained ideas while on travel in Europe as a young man.

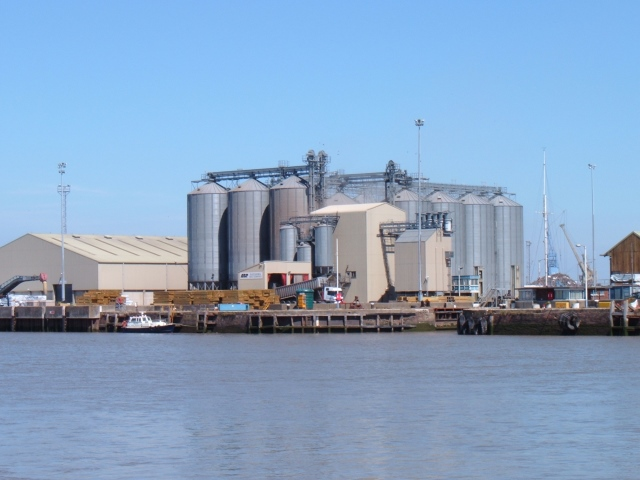
Partial view of King's Lynn Docks, including its prominent grain silos

During the 16th and 17th centuries, the town's principal export was grain. While no longer a major international port, King's Lynn continued to import goods such as iron and timber. The discovery of the Americas shifted trade patterns in favour of ports on England's west coast, to Lynn's detriment. The town was further eclipsed by the rapid growth of London.

In the late 17th century, imports of wine from Spain, Portugal, and France flourished, and coastal trade remained active. At the time, water transport was significantly cheaper than moving goods by road. Large shipments of coal arrived from the north-east of England.

The draining of the Fens began in the mid–17th century, transforming the land into productive farmland and enabling large quantities of produce to supply London's growing market. During this period, King's Lynn remained a major fishing port. Greenland Fishery House, built on Bridge Street in 1605, stands as a testament to that trade. By the late 17th century, the town had also seen the development of shipbuilding and glass-making industries.

In the early 18th century, Daniel Defoe described the town as 'beautiful, well built and well situated'. Shipbuilding flourished, along with related trades such as sail-making and rope-making. Glass-making also prospered, and brewing became another key industry. The Norwich Company of Comedians had been performing in the town since the 1750s; in 1766, a permanent theatre was established, followed by the construction of a new playhouse in 1805. The first bank in King's Lynn opened in 1784.

A grim example of early 18th-century penal severity occurred on 28 September 1708, when Michael Hammond, aged seven, and his 11-year-old sister Ann were convicted of stealing a loaf of bread and sentenced to death by hanging. Their executions took place publicly near the South Gate. The local Member of Parliament for King's Lynn at the time was Sir Robert Walpole, who served in the Parliament of Great Britain and is widely regarded as the de facto first Prime Minister, remaining the longest-serving in British history.

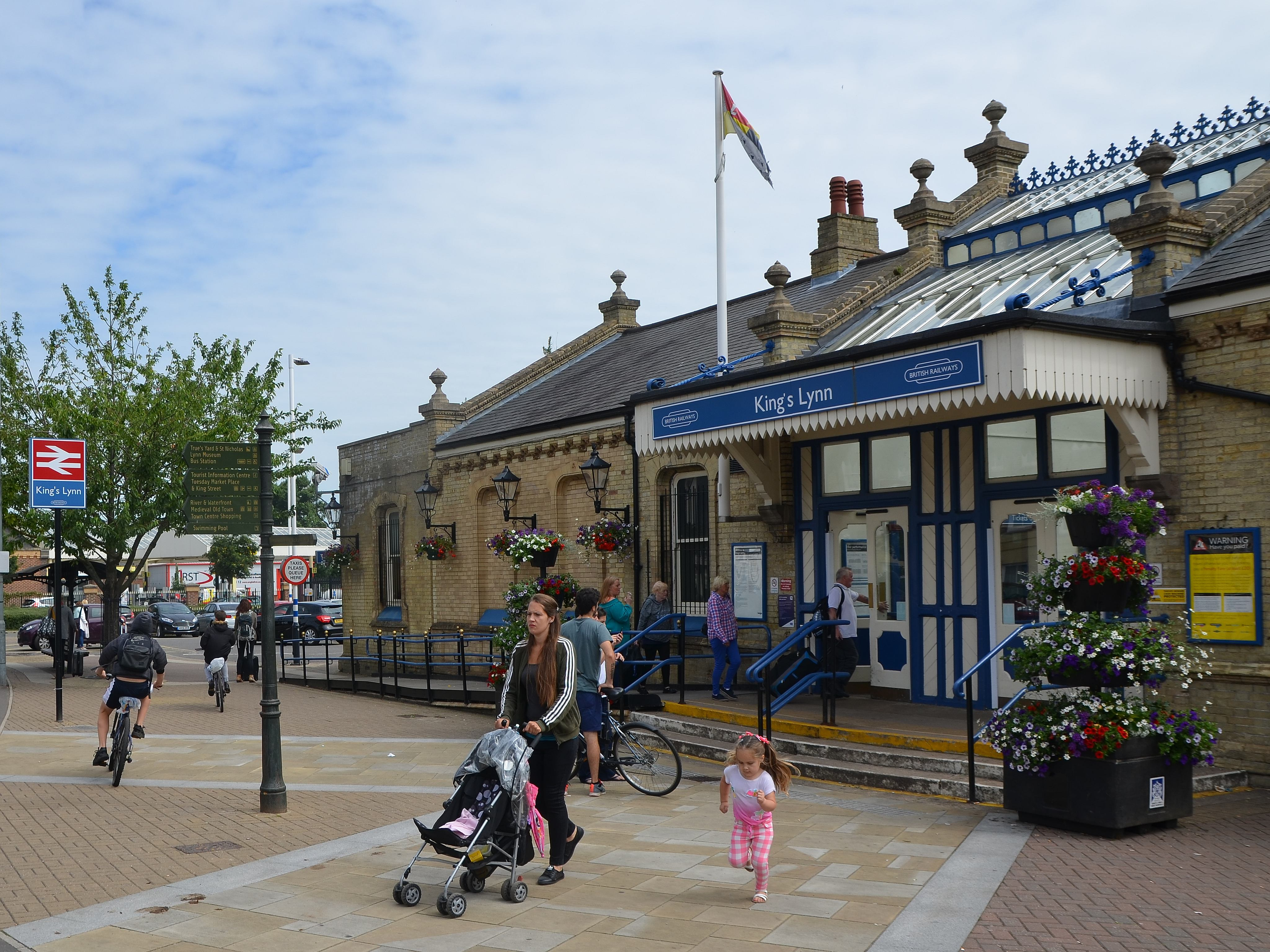
King's Lynn railway station in July 2017

The town's decline from the late 17th century was reversed with the arrival of the railways in 1847, primarily through the Great Eastern Railway—later the London and North Eastern Railway—which connected King's Lynn to Hunstanton, Dereham and Cambridge. The town was also served by the Midland and Great Northern Joint Railway (M&GN), whose offices stood on Austin Street, with a station at South Lynn (now dismantled) that served as its operational control centre before relocating to Melton Constable. The M&GN lines across Norfolk ceased passenger services in February 1959.

The town's amenities continued to improve in the 20th century. A museum opened in 1904 and a public library in 1905. The first cinema, the Majestic, officially opened on 23 May 1928. (The year is marked in a stained-glass window on the front of the building.) The town council began a programme of regeneration in the 1930s.

During the First World War, King's Lynn was among the first towns in England to suffer aerial bombing, when the German Imperial Navy's Zeppelin L 4 (LZ 27), commanded by Kapitänleutnant Magnus von Platen-Hallermund, dropped eleven bombs—both incendiary and high explosive—during the night of 19 January 1915. The raid caused significant damage across several residential areas: bombs fell near Tennyson Avenue and separately struck Bentinck Street, Albert Street, and other nearby locations. Two residents—26-year-old war widow Alice Gazely and 14-year-old Percy Goate—died from shock, and approximately thirteen others were injured.

At the outbreak of the Second World War in 1939, King's Lynn was initially considered a safe area, and many evacuees were sent from London. However, the town experienced several bombing raids during the conflict and a total 59 civilians died by enemy action in the borough.

By the 1950s, local breweries had closed, but new industries had emerged, including food canning in the 1930s and Campbell's soup production in the 1950s. In the 1960s, the council promoted economic development through the establishment of an industrial estate at Hardwick.

In 1962, King's Lynn was designated as an overspill town for London, leading to population growth and the development of new housing estates in areas such as the Woottons and Gaywood. The town centre was redeveloped during the 1960s, resulting in the demolition of many earlier buildings. Lynnsport, a major sports and leisure complex, opened in 1982, and the Corn Exchange in Tuesday Market Place was converted into a theatre in 1996.

=== Recent changes ===
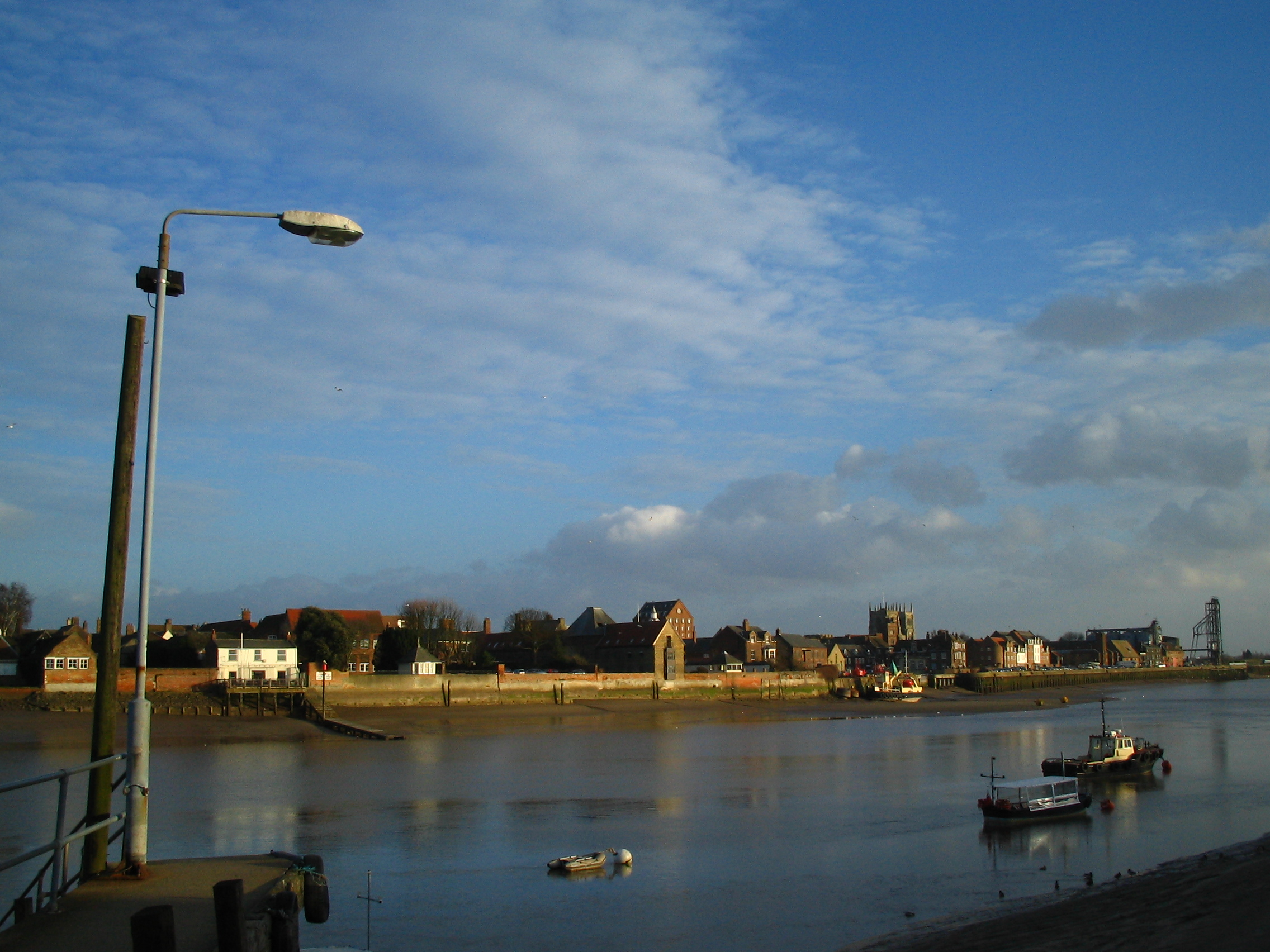
View of King’s Lynn from West Lynn, looking across the River Great Ouse

Since 2004, work has been under way to regenerate the town under a multi-million-pound scheme. The 1960s Vancouver Shopping Centre (now the Vancouver Quarter) was refurbished in 2005 under the scheme, but was expected to last only 25 years, according to the construction firm, even with a planned extension. An award-winning £6 million multi-storey car park was built.

To the south of the town, residential housing appeared on a large area of brownfield land. Plans for another housing estate alongside the River Nar were opposed locally and halted by the economic situation. There is also a business park, parkland, a school, shops and a new relief road in a £300 million-plus scheme.

In 2006, King's Lynn became the United Kingdom's first member of The Hanse (Die Hanse), a network of towns across Europe that belonged historically to the Hanseatic League. The league was an influential medieval trading association of merchant towns around the Baltic Sea and the North Sea, which contributed to Lynn's development.

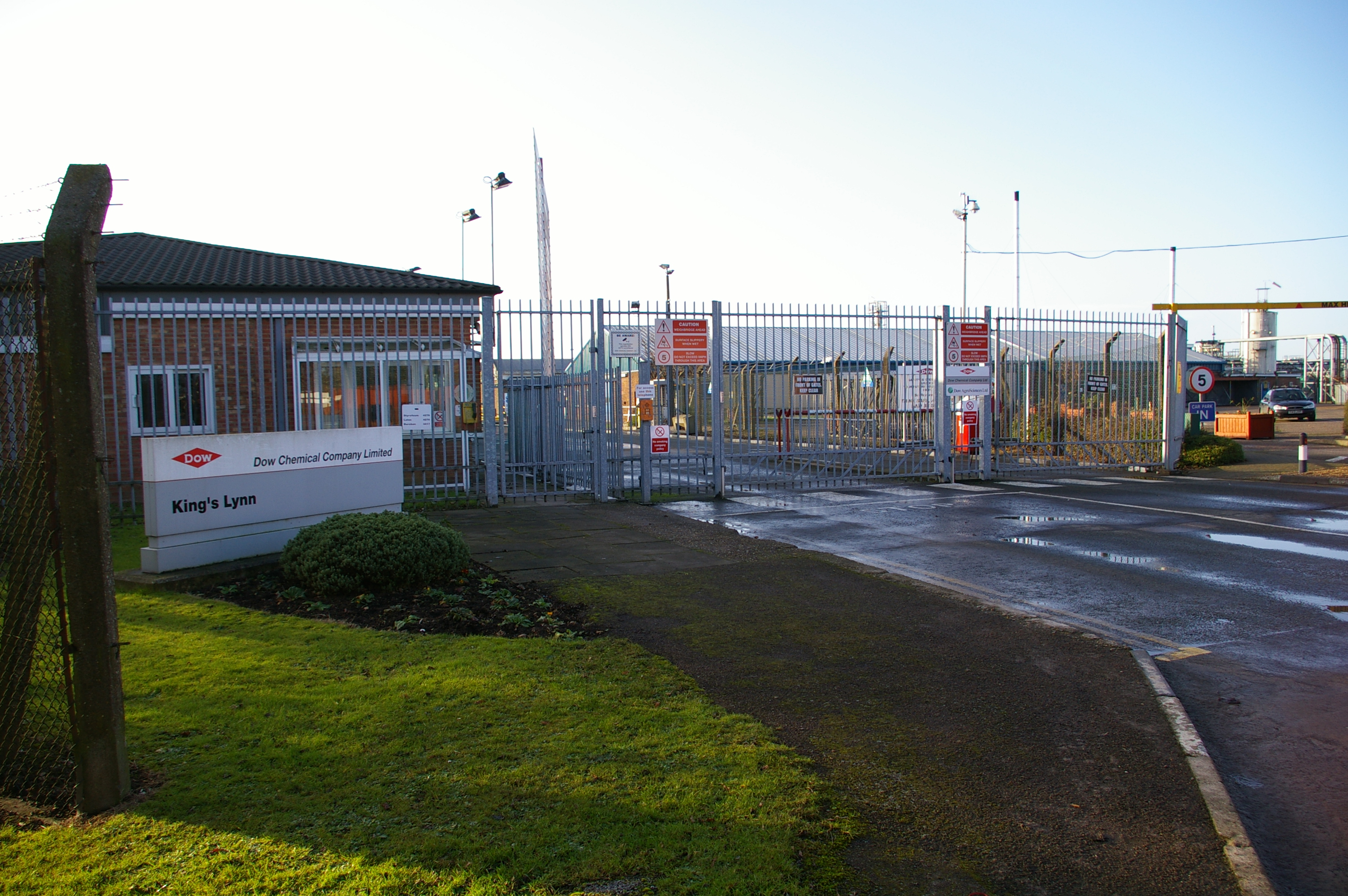
The former Dow Chemical Company works in King's Lynn. The facility, which closed in 2019, was the site of a major industrial explosion in 1976.

The Borough Council commissioned and accepted a 2008 report by DTZ that dubbed King's Lynn's workforce as "low-value" with a "low skills base" and the town as having a "poor lifestyle offer". The quality of services and amenities was "unattractive to higher-value inward investors and professional employees with higher disposable incomes". Average earnings were well below regional and national levels, and many jobs in tourism, leisure and hotels were subject to seasonal fluctuations and likewise poorly paid. Education and workforce skills were described as below the national average. The borough ranked 150th out of 354 for social deprivation.

In 2009, a proposal was made for the Campbell's Meadow factory site to be redeveloped as a 5-hectare (12-acre) employment and business park. In June 2011, Tesco gained a permit for a superstore. On 8 June 2010, it unveiled regeneration plans that would cost £32 million and were billed to bring 900 new jobs. Tesco pledged £4 million of improvements in other areas of the town. While it planned to spend £1.6 million widening Hardwick Road, the Sainsbury's bid was preferred by the Council as offering the town more benefits.

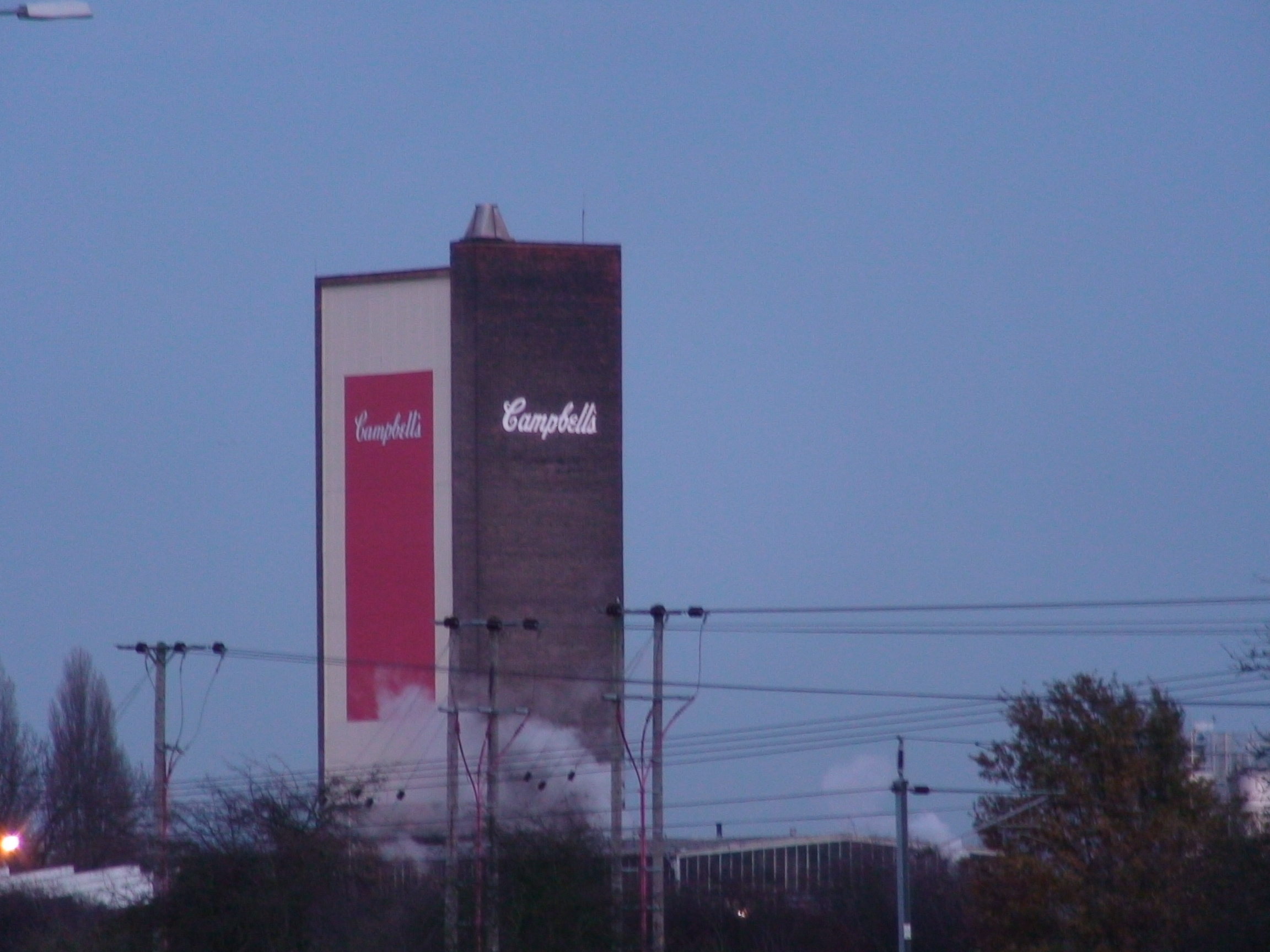
Campbell's Tower in 2006, prior to its demolition in 2012. The tower was part of the Campbell's Soup factory, which operated in King's Lynn from 1959 to 2007 as the company's first major plant outside the United States.

Sainsbury's £40 million plans for a superstore opposite Tesco on the Pinguin Foods site yielded an estimated 300 jobs. This was the key to securing the future of Pinguin Foods in King's Lynn. Pinguin Foods released 12 acres (5 ha) of its 44-acre (18 ha) site to accommodate the proposed store. Morston Assets and Sainsbury's plan included a link road between Scania Way and Queen Elizabeth Way to improve access and allow the industrial estate to attract new employers, while Sainsbury's maintains its store in the town centre. It has pledged £1.75 million for highways improvements and a further £7 million to invest in the Pinguin Foods factory.

At 8 am on 15 January 2012, Campbell's Tower—a prominent industrial landmark in King's Lynn—was demolished in a planned event. The demolition was initiated by Sarah Griffiths, winner of a public competition; her father, Mick Locke, had died in 1995 at age 52 following a steam-related accident at the factory. The tower had been part of Campbell's first UK production facility, which opened in the 1950s and, at its peak in the early 1990s, employed over 700 people.

A fire station was opened by Queen Elizabeth II in February 2015.

== Governance ==
King's Lynn became a municipal borough in 1883. The present Borough of King's Lynn and West Norfolk was an amalgamation of the Borough of King's Lynn, the urban districts of Downham Market and Hunstanton, and the rural districts of Docking, Downham, Freebridge Lynn, and Marshland. No successor parish was formed so it became unparished. A charter trustees was formed to preserve the borough status of the former borough until 1981 when the "West Norfolk" district was renamed to "King’s Lynn and West Norfolk" and given borough status.

=== Heraldry ===
Coat of arms of King's Lynn and West Norfolk

The shield in the coat of arms of King's Lynn and West Norfolk is that of the ancient Borough of Lynn, recorded at the College of Arms in 1563. It shows the legend of Margaret of Antioch, who has appeared on Lynn shields since the 13th century, and to whom the parish church is dedicated.

The heraldic badge of King's Lynn and West Norfolk

The per chevron division and addition of a bordure serve to distinguish the shield from its predecessor, while retaining its medieval simplicity. The bordure also suggests the wider bounds of the new authority, with the seven parts symbolising the seven amalgamated authorities. The gull on the crest is a maritime reference. It has appeared as a supporter in some representations, but officially stands on a bollard to make it distinctive. It supports a crown or coronet like a King's Lynn supporter and a lion from the crest of Downham Market. The coronet refers to the Borough's royal connections. The cross held by the gull is an extension of the two in the shield, and the cross in the coat of arms of Freebridge Lynn Rural District.

The supporters are based on the crest of the Hunstanton Urban District Council. The lion is a variation of the lions, or leopards, in the Royal Coat of Arms of the United Kingdom and its fish tail suggests the borough's links with the sea. The fish–lion is also the central feature in the borough's badge, but here it is surrounded by a garland of oak leaves as a reference to the rural nature of much of the district. Oak leaves also appear in the coronet in the crest of the former Downham Market Urban District Council.

=== Twin towns ===
King's Lynn is twinned with:

- Emmerich am Rhein, Germany

== Geography ==
=== Topography ===
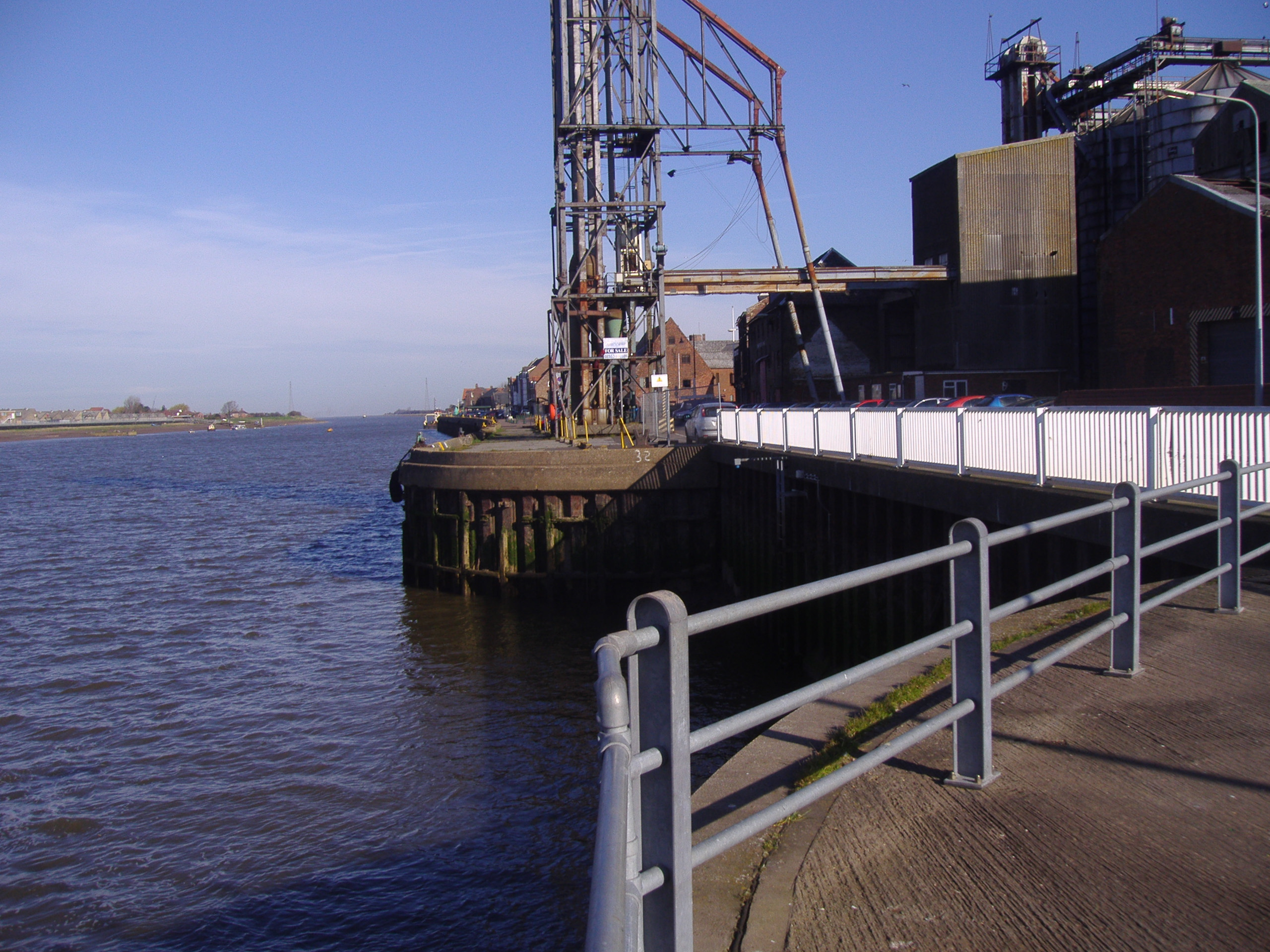
The mouth of Gaywood River

King's Lynn is the northernmost settlement on the River Great Ouse, lying 97 miles (156 km) north of London and 44 miles (71 km) west of Norwich. The town lies about 5 miles (8 km) south of the Wash, a fourfold estuary subject to dangerous tides and shifting sandbanks, on the north-west margin of East Anglia. King's Lynn has an area of 11 square miles (28 km^{2}).

The Great Ouse at Lynn is about 200 metres (660 ft) wide and the outfall for much of the Fens' drainage system. The much smaller Gaywood River also flows through the town, joining the Great Ouse at the southern end of South Quay, close to the town centre. A small section known as West Lynn lies on the west bank, linked to the town centre by one of the oldest ferries in the country. Other districts of King's Lynn include the town centre, North Lynn, South Lynn, and Gaywood.

=== Climate ===
King's Lynn has a temperate oceanic climate (Köppen: Cfb). The annual mean daytime temperature is around 14 °C (57 °F). January is the coldest month with mean minimum temperatures between 0 to 1 °C (32.0 to 33.8 °F). July and August are the warmest, with mean daily maximum temperatures of some 21 °C (70 °F).

There are two Met Office weather stations close to King's Lynn: Terrington St Clement, about 4 miles (6 km) to the west and RAF Marham, about 10 miles (16 km) to the south-east.

The absolute maximum temperature at Terrington stands at 35.1 °C (95.2 °F) recorded in August 2003, though in a more average year the warmest day will only reach 29.4 °C (84.9 °F), with 13.8 days in total attaining a temperature of 25.1 °C (77.2 °F) or more. Typically all these figures are marginally lower than those for the southern half of the Fens due to the presence of onshore sea breezes, and occasional haar (cold sea fog), especially in early summer and late spring. However, with a strong enough offshore breeze, the area can be notably warm. Terrington (along with Cambridge Botanical Gardens) achieved the national highest temperature of 2007, 30.1 °C (86.2 °F)

The absolute minimum at Terrington is −15.4 °C (4.3 °F), set in January 1979. A total of 41.6 nights will report an air frost at Terrington and 51.9 nights at Marham.

Annual rainfall totals 621 mm (24 in) at Marham, and 599 mm (24 in) at Terrington, with 1 mm or more falling on 115 and 113 days, respectively. All averages refer to the 30-year observation period 1971–2000.

Climate data for RAF Marham, (Note: Weather station is located 10.0 miles (16.1 km) from the King's Lynn centre.) (1991–2020 normals, extremes 1957–present)
Month	Jan	Feb	Mar	Apr	May	Jun	Jul	Aug	Sep	Oct	Nov	Dec	Year
Record high °C (°F)	14.8 (58.6)	18.9 (66.0)	22.0 (71.6)	27.2 (81.0)	28.4 (83.1)	33.9 (93.0)	39.2 (102.6)	34.8 (94.6)	31.1 (88.0)	28.9 (84.0)	17.8 (64.0)	16.0 (60.8)	39.2 (102.6)
Mean daily maximum °C (°F)	7.2 (45.0)	8.0 (46.4)	10.7 (51.3)	13.9 (57.0)	17.1 (62.8)	19.9 (67.8)	22.5 (72.5)	22.3 (72.1)	19.2 (66.6)	14.9 (58.8)	10.4 (50.7)	7.5 (45.5)	14.5 (58.1)
Daily mean °C (°F)	4.2 (39.6)	4.6 (40.3)	6.7 (44.1)	9.2 (48.6)	12.3 (54.1)	15.2 (59.4)	17.5 (63.5)	17.3 (63.1)	14.7 (58.5)	11.1 (52.0)	7.1 (44.8)	4.5 (40.1)	10.4 (50.7)
Mean daily minimum °C (°F)	1.1 (34.0)	1.1 (34.0)	2.6 (36.7)	4.5 (40.1)	7.4 (45.3)	10.4 (50.7)	12.4 (54.3)	12.3 (54.1)	10.1 (50.2)	7.3 (45.1)	3.7 (38.7)	1.4 (34.5)	6.2 (43.2)
Record low °C (°F)	−15.4 (4.3)	−14.5 (5.9)	−8.7 (16.3)	−5.0 (23.0)	−4.0 (24.8)	−0.6 (30.9)	4.0 (39.2)	3.0 (37.4)	−0.9 (30.4)	−5.5 (22.1)	−8.6 (16.5)	−13.4 (7.9)	−15.4 (4.3)
Average precipitation mm (inches)	55.3 (2.18)	43.2 (1.70)	43.5 (1.71)	43.5 (1.71)	48.2 (1.90)	62.4 (2.46)	57.8 (2.28)	62.1 (2.44)	55.4 (2.18)	66.4 (2.61)	63.3 (2.49)	59.3 (2.33)	660.3 (26.00)
Average precipitation days (≥ 1 mm)	11.6	10.3	9.4	9.1	8.6	10.0	9.3	9.4	8.9	11.0	12.3	11.7	121.6
Mean monthly sunshine hours	56.9	78.2	112.0	169.1	209.4	194.0	211.3	192.2	145.2	107.6	68.9	51.5	1,596.1
Source 1: Met Office
Source 2: Starlings Roost Weather

Climate data for Terrington St Clement
Month	Jan	Feb	Mar	Apr	May	Jun	Jul	Aug	Sep	Oct	Nov	Dec	Year
Record high °C (°F)	13.9 (57.0)	17.4 (63.3)	24.4 (75.9)	25.3 (77.5)	28.4 (83.1)	32.4 (90.3)	33.5 (92.3)	35.1 (95.2)	29.0 (84.2)	25.0 (77.0)	17.8 (64.0)	16.4 (61.5)	35.1 (95.2)
Mean daily maximum °C (°F)	6.5 (43.7)	7.1 (44.8)	10.0 (50.0)	12.2 (54.0)	15.9 (60.6)	18.7 (65.7)	21.5 (70.7)	21.8 (71.2)	18.4 (65.1)	14.2 (57.6)	9.5 (49.1)	7.2 (45.0)	13.6 (56.5)
Mean daily minimum °C (°F)	0.9 (33.6)	1.0 (33.8)	2.6 (36.7)	3.9 (39.0)	6.7 (44.1)	9.5 (49.1)	11.4 (52.5)	11.4 (52.5)	9.7 (49.5)	6.8 (44.2)	3.4 (38.1)	1.8 (35.2)	5.8 (42.4)
Record low °C (°F)	−15.4 (4.3)	−12.8 (9.0)	−8.3 (17.1)	−5.4 (22.3)	−4.2 (24.4)	0.0 (32.0)	2.7 (36.9)	3.3 (37.9)	—	−4.3 (24.3)	−8.2 (17.2)	−11.5 (11.3)	−15.4 (4.3)
Average precipitation mm (inches)	54.65 (2.15)	36.43 (1.43)	46.75 (1.84)	42.73 (1.68)	47.97 (1.89)	51.13 (2.01)	45.73 (1.80)	54.53 (2.15)	53.51 (2.11)	55.07 (2.17)	57.86 (2.28)	52.44 (2.06)	598.79 (23.57)
Source: KNMI

=== Parks ===
The largest of the town's several public parks are the Walks, a historic 17-hectare urban park in the centre of King's Lynn. They are the only town walk in Norfolk to survive from the 18th century. The Heritage Lottery Fund donated £4.3 million towards restoring them and adding modern amenities. They also include the Red Mount, a Grade I-listed 15th-century chapel. In 1998, the Walks were designated by English Heritage as a Grade II national historic park.

The Walks as a whole had a different, earlier origin, conceived of not as a municipal park, as one understands the term today, but as a promenade for citizens, away from the smell, grime and bustle of the town centre. Harding's Pits form another public park, to the south of the town. This informal area of open space with large public sculptures was laid out to reflect the town's history. Harding's Pits are managed by local volunteers under a management firm, which successfully fought off a Borough Council attempts to turn them into an attenuation drain.

== Demography ==
In 2007, King's Lynn had a population of 42,800. At Norfolk's 2007 census, King's Lynn, together with West Norfolk, had a population of 143,500, with an average population density of 1.0 persons per hectare. For figures after 2011 see King's Lynn and West Norfolk.

== Economy ==
King's Lynn has always been a centre for fishing and seafood (especially inshore prawns, shrimps and cockles). There have also been glass-making and small-scale engineering works – many fairground and steam engines were built here. It still contains much farm-related industry, including food processing. There are several chemical factories and the town retains a role as an import centre. In general, it is a regional centre for a still sparsely populated part of England.

King's Lynn was the fastest growing port in Great Britain in 2008. Department for Transport figures show that through-put increased by 33 per cent.

In 2008, the German Palm Group began to erect one of the world's largest paper machines, constructed by Voith Paper. With a web speed of up to 2000 metres a minute and a web width of 10.63 metres, it can produce 400,000 tons a year of newsprint paper, based on 100-per-cent recycled paper. The start-up was on 21 August 2009.

The Port of King's Lynn has facilities for dry bulk cargo such as cereals and liquid bulk products such as petroleum products for Pace Petroleum. It also handles timber imported from Scandinavia and the Baltics and has handling sheds for steel imports.

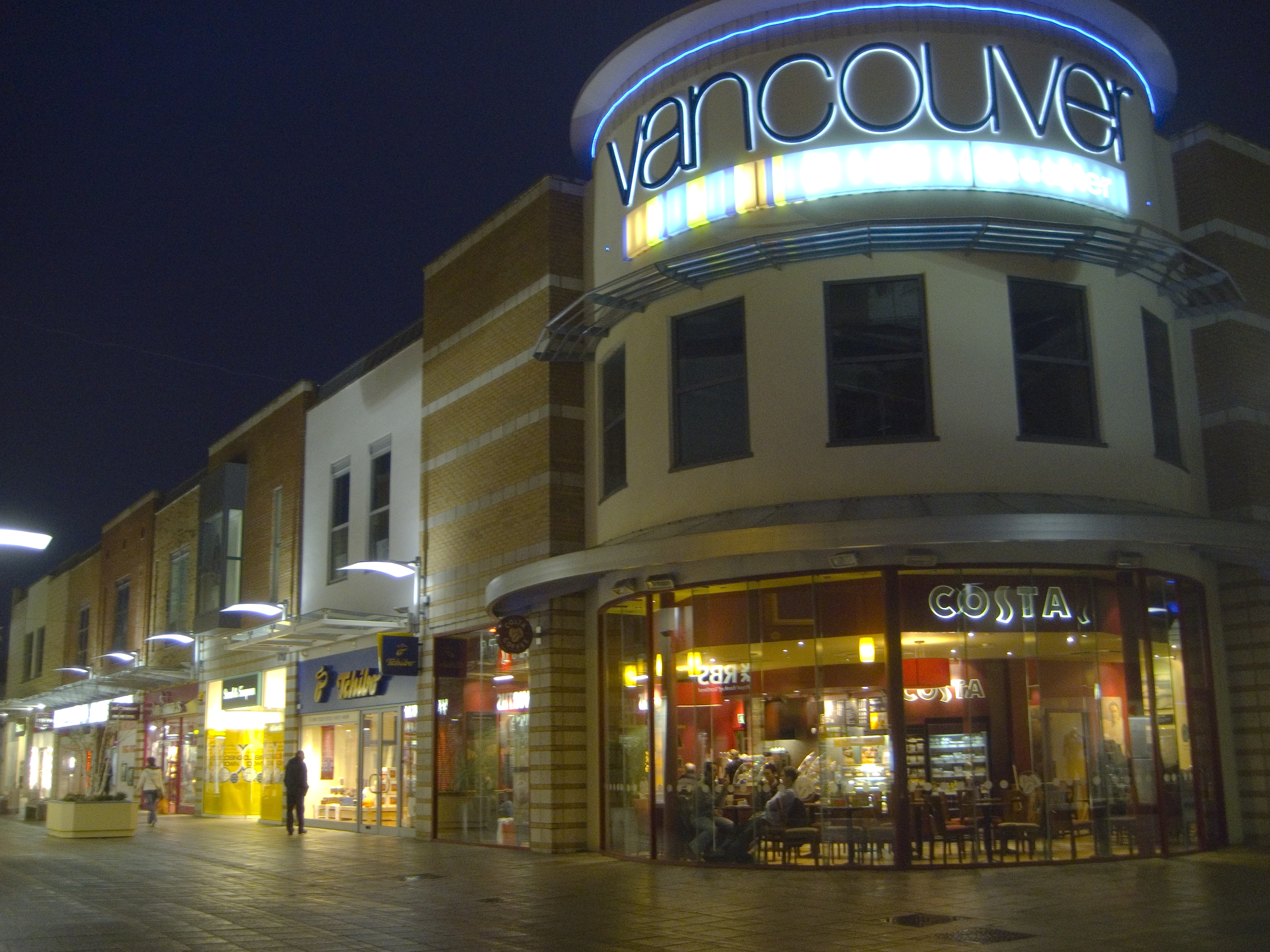
The Vancouver Shopping District at night

King's Lynn is the prime retail centre in West Norfolk. The town centre is dominated by budget shops, reflecting the spending power of much of the population. The town centre fulfils a leisure role with entertainment centres, bars and restaurants, and has a range of service functions. It provides about 5,300 retailing jobs.

The town centre has 73,000 sq. m. of retail floor space in 347 shops, which exceeds the comparable centres of Bury St Edmunds and Boston. However, whilst the percentage of floor space in comparison shopping and that occupied by multiple retailers is above the national average, King's Lynn offers a more limited range of choice.

Tourism in King's Lynn is a minor industry, but it attracts visitors to its historic centre, and as a base for visiting Sandringham House and other country houses in the area. Within the town and across the nearby Fenland are some of the finest historic churches in Britain, built in a period when King's Lynn and its hinterland were wealthy from trade and wool.

== Transport ==
=== Roads ===
King's Lynn is linked to the cities of Norwich and Peterborough by the A47, to Cambridge by the A10, and to Spalding and the North via the A17. Parts of north and east Norfolk are reached by the A148 and the A149. There is currently a campaign led by Norfolk County Council to dual the A47, due to the area's poor road networks and lack of motorways compared to other areas of the country.

=== Railway ===
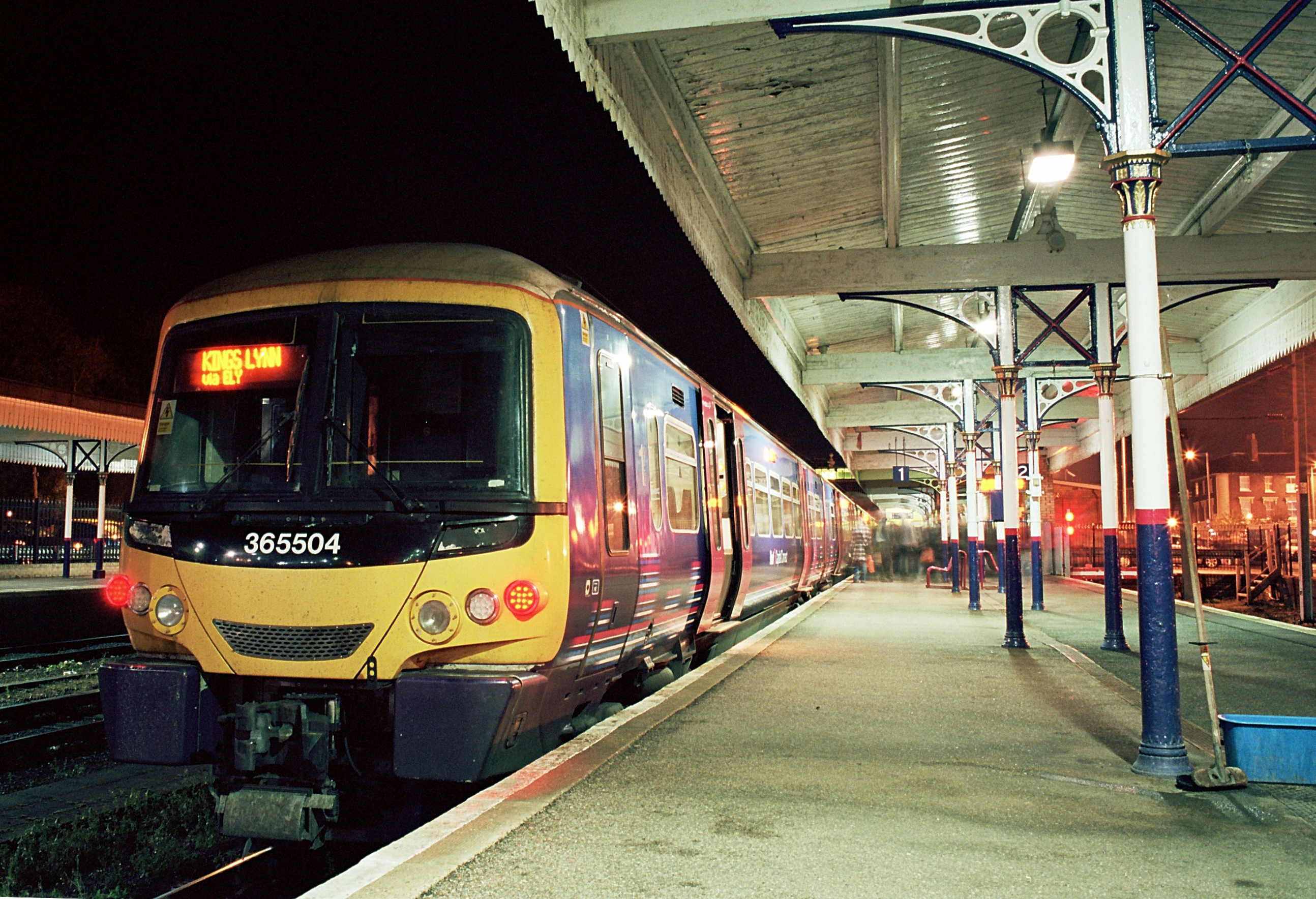
A Class 365 train at King's Lynn station in November 2009

King's Lynn railway station, terminus of the Fen Line, is the sole railway facility in King's Lynn. It provides regular services to Cambridge and London King's Cross. South Lynn railway station closed to passengers in 1959, as did Hunstanton in 1969.

Various groups have campaigned for the reopening of a railway between King's Lynn and Hunstanton. In a 2019 report from the Campaign for Better Transport the route was listed as a "priority 2" scheme, namely a "feasible [project] which require[s] further development or changed circumstances (for example, housing development proposals) to assist [it] in being taken forward"

=== Buses ===
Nearly all Stagecoach East services in the area have been withdrawn, leaving most services in King's Lynn operated by Lynx or Go To Town (West Norfolk Community Transport Project).

King's Lynn is served by the excel bus route between Peterborough and Norwich operated by First Eastern Counties. The Coasthopper route from King's Lynn runs round the Norfolk Coast to Cromer but, since Stagecoach withdrew from Norfolk, the western section has been run by Lynx as Coastliner 36 and extended inland from Wells-next-the-Sea to Fakenham. The Wells–Cromer section is run by Sanders Coaches and still known as Coasthopper, but now extends inland to North Walsham.

== Media ==
King's Lynn has two local newspapers: the twice-weekly Lynn News, owned by Iliffe Media, and Your Local Paper, a free weekly ( now also owned by Iliffe Media). KL magazine is a free lifestyle magazine that promotes the best of west and north Norfolk. It has been published monthly since October 2010 and is distributed to local businesses (now issued bi-monthly). It also issues special Food and Home Design & Build editions.

King's Lynn is served by BBC Radio Norfolk, Heart East, Greatest Hits Radio (West Norfolk), KL1 Radio, Radio West Norfolk and all national BBC radio stations. The local college has a web-based TV station run by media students, entitled SpringboardTV.com, and holds an awards ceremony at the end of each academic year.

Television services are provided by BBC East, BBC Yorkshire and Lincolnshire, ITV Anglia, and ITV Yorkshire.

== Education ==
Three of King's Lynn's four secondary schools are located in the town: King Edward VII School, the King's Lynn Academy and Springwood High School. The fourth, St Clements High School, is in the nearby village of Terrington St Clement. The first is known for its physical education department, King's Lynn Academy for its maths and IT specialities, and Springwood for performing arts and drama. The nearest independent school is Wisbech Grammar School in Cambridgeshire.

The town's further education college, the College of West Anglia, was founded in 1894 as King's Lynn Technical School. In 1973, it was renamed Norfolk College of Arts and Technology, and, in 1998, merged with Cambridgeshire College of Agriculture and Horticulture, which added campuses in Wisbech (now closed) and Milton; it changed the name to the College of West Anglia. It retained this name in April 2006, when it merged with the Isle College in Wisbech.

== Culture ==
=== St George's Guildhall ===
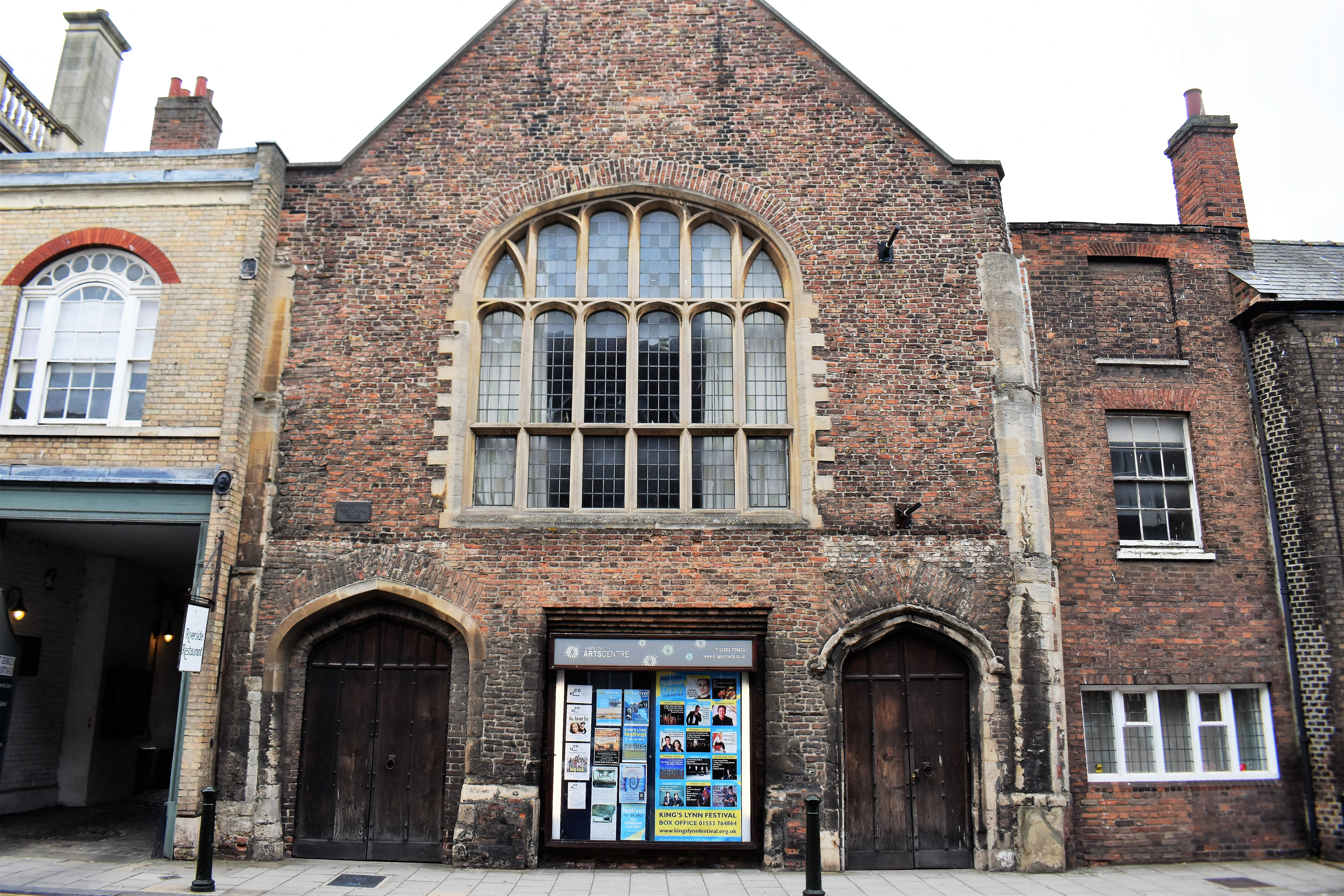
Guildhall of St George

The Guild of St George was founded in 1376 and acquired land for the Guildhall of St George in 1406, which was in use by 1428. It offered plays in the Guildhall, the first known being a nativity play in January 1445. This makes it the UK's oldest working theatre.

The Guildhall was used for meetings, dinners and performance until 1547, when King Edward VI dissolved the Guilds. It then became the property of Lynn Corporation and known as the Common Town Hall. Research by the University of East Anglia confirms as probable the oral history of King's Lynn that William Shakespeare performed in the Guildhall in 1593. This is the only still-working theatre in the world that can credibly claim to have hosted Shakespeare. In 1766, Guildhall shows were so popular that a new interior was built inside the present structure, probably on the earlier footprint. By 1945, the Guildhall was almost derelict and in danger of demolition. It was bought by Alexander Penrose, who gave it to the National Trust in 1951. The Pilgrim Trust, Arts Council and public subscription led to conversion into an Arts Centre. Queen Elizabeth the Queen Mother opened it in July 1951 and launched the King's Lynn Festival.

Today, the Guildhall is owned by the National Trust and leased to the Borough Council of King's Lynn and West Norfolk. Various groups hire the building for a year-round programme of theatre, dance, music, lectures and film; amongst them are Shakespeare's Guildhall Trust, King's Lynn Festival, King's Lynn Community Cinema Club. Shakespeare's Guildhall Trust have volunteers who open the theatre to visitors.

=== Arts ===
Composer Ralph Vaughan Williams visited King's Lynn in January 1905 and collected several folk songs from the area.

Ruth, Lady Fermoy, a concert pianist, moved to King's Lynn in 1931 as the bride of Lord Edmund Fermoy, who would become the town mayor and local MP. She helped to organise concerts of high-standard professional music.

In 1951, Lady Fermoy complemented the Festival of Britain with a King's Lynn Festival of the Arts. She was a friend and lady-in-waiting to Queen Elizabeth – later the Queen Mother – who agreed to become the festival patron and, in July 1951, officially opened the restored St George's Guildhall. She remained an enthusiastic and active supporter and patron of the festival until her death in March 2002.

The King's Lynn Festival remains the premier music and arts festival in West Norfolk. It is primarily known for classical music, but also hosts jazz, choral, folk, opera, dance, films, talks and exhibitions, along with fringe events each year.

The King's Lynn Literature Festival, amalgamating the previous annual Poetry and Fiction Festivals, is held over a weekend in September each year, usually in the town hall. The Annual Hanse Festival first took place in 2009.

=== Displays ===
Stories of Lynn museum opened in March 2016, as part of the King's Lynn Town Hall complex. Set within the newly-revealed vaulted undercroft of the 15th-century Trinity Guildhall, it presents the town's collection in an extensive, nationally significant interactive and multi-media exhibition. True's Yard Fisherfolk Museum displays the social history of the North End fishermen, run by volunteers. It includes a cottage and a smokehouse. Since 2013, there has been a local award-winning Military Museum operated by The Bridge for Heroes Charity to raise funds. Lynn Museum, run by Norfolk Museums Service in Market Street, covers the town's local history and the Bronze Age timber circle Seahenge.

Festival Too is held in Tuesday Market Place each summer. Performers have included Midge Ure, Deacon Blue, Suzi Quatro, 10cc, Mungo Jerry, the Human League, the Buzzcocks, M People and Beverley Knight.

The historic Majestic Cinema in the town centre now has four screens; and there are two further cinema screens in the town's Corn Exchange.

King's Lynn's main venue for concerts, stand-up comedy shows and other live events is the Corn Exchange in Tuesday Market Place. Many smaller venues such as Bar Red and the Wenns contribute to the local music scene, along with acts from other parts of the country.

=== Mart ===
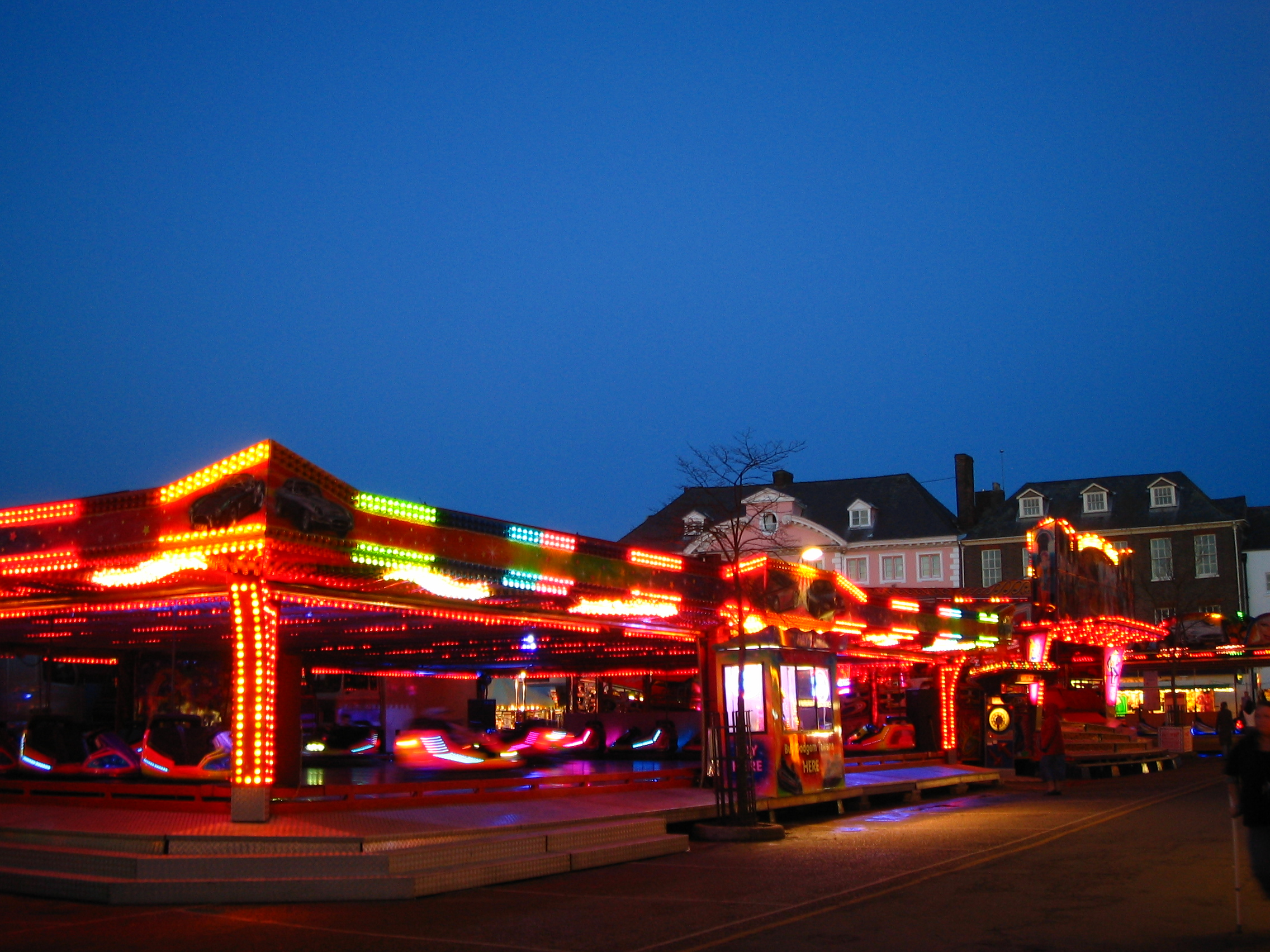
The Mart on the Tuesday Market Place

In the 16th century, King's Lynn's Tuesday Market Place hosted two trade fairs that attracted visitors from as far as Italy and Germany. As the importance of such fairs declined, the Mart has become a funfair, reduced to a single fortnight's annual event that begins on 14 February (Valentine's Day). It is also a memorial to Frederick Savage, who partnered the Showmen's Guild of Great Britain to develop new funfair attractions.

=== Sport ===
The town's football club, King's Lynn Town, play in the National League North as of the 2026–27 season. It was formed in 2010, after the original King's Lynn FC was wound up in December 2009. Its home games are played at The Walks Stadium in Tennyson Road.

King's Lynn's speedway team, the King's Lynn Stars, race at the Adrian Flux Arena in Saddlebow Road. The track has been run since 1965 on an open licence. It hosted Speedway-type events in the 1950s.

One of the town's basketball clubs, King's Lynn Fury, previously played in the National League out of Lynnsport and represented the town in national competitions from 2004 to 2017. Lynn Nets, formed in 2008, also runs a programme in local competitions.

The historic hockey team The Pelicans, dating from 1920, currently plays at Lynnsport, having been based in nearby North Runcton until 1996.

== Notable people ==
- Nick Aldis (born 1986), wrestler known as Magnus etc., is billed as from King's Lynn.
- Robert Armin (c. 1563–1615), actor with Lord Chamberlain's Men and writer, was born in Bishop's Lynn.
- Thomas Baines (1820–1875), painter and explorer in Africa and Australia, was born in King's Lynn.
- William Baly (1814–1861), physician extraordinary to Queen Victoria, was born and raised in King's Lynn.
- Robert Barnes (c. 1495 – 1540), an English reformer and martyr.
- Mrs. Bernard Beere (1851–1915), actress
- Emily Bell (born 1965), journalist and academic, was born in King's Lynn.
- Martin Brundle (born 1959), Formula One racing driver and commentator, was born in King's Lynn, as was his racing-driver son Alex in 1990.
- F. R. Buckley (1896–1976), author and broadcaster
- Charles Burney (1726–1814), historian of music, served as organist of St Margaret's Church for nine years from 1751.
- Charles Burney (1757–1817), scholar and bibliophile, was born in Lynn.
- Frances Burney (1752–1840), novelist (Evelina etc.) and diarist, was born in Lynn.
- Sarah Burney (1772–1844), novelist, was born in Lynn.
- John Capgrave (1393–1464), prior, historian and theologian, was born and died in Bishop's Lynn.
- Richard Carpenter (1929–2012), actor, screenwriter and author, was born in King's Lynn.
- Gerry Conway (1947-2024), percussionist with Cat Stevens etc., was born in King's Lynn.
- G. G. Coulton (1858–1947), historian and controversialist, was born and partly educated in King's Lynn.
- Samuel Gurney Cresswell (1827–1867), naval captain and Northwest Passage explorer, born and died in King's Lynn.
- Joseph Dines (1886–1918), England amateur footballer and Olympic gold medallist (1912), born in King's Lynn.
- Clara Dow (1883–1969), soprano in Gilbert and Sullivan operas, was born in King's Lynn.
- Alison Dunhill (born 1950), artist, poet and art historian, lives and works in King's Lynn.
- Tim FitzHigham (born 1975), multi-award winning comedian, writer and record holder was born in King's Lynn.
- Charles Wycliffe Goodwin (1817–1878) Egyptologist, bible scholar and judge of British Supreme Court for China and Japan was born and raised in King's Lynn. (Brother of Harvey Goodwin)
- Francis Goodwin (1784–1835), architect, was born in King's Lynn and kept a house there.
- Harvey Goodwin (1818–1891), bishop and religious writer, born and raised in King's Lynn.
- Florence Green (1901–2012), one of Britain's oldest people, British World War I veteran, moved to King's Lynn in 1920.
- William Gurnall (1616–1679), author and clergyman
- Ian Hamilton (1938–2001), poet and critic, was born in King's Lynn to Scottish parents.
- Joe Harkness (1986–2026), naturalist and writer
- Deaf Havana (formed 2005), English post-hardcore rock band, formed in King's Lynn.
- Charles Edward Hubbard (1900–1980), botanist specializing in grasses, attended King Edward VII Grammar School.
- John Hullier (c. 1520–1556), Protestant martyr, was burnt at the stake for preaching in Lynn.
- Jack Huston (born 1982), actor, appeared as Richard Harrow in Boardwalk Empire, in a supporting role in American Hustle, and as the eponymous lead in Ben-Hur (2016 film) historical drama.
- Kathryn Johnson (born 1967), Olympic field hockey player, was born in King's Lynn.
- Sir Benjamin Keene (1697–1757), diplomat successful in Spain, was born and educated in King's Lynn.
- Margery Kempe (c. 1373 – c. 1438) first autobiographer in English, born and probably died in Bishop's Lynn.
- Anne Long (c. 1681–1711) friend of Jonathan Swift, fled from creditors to King's Lynn and died there.
- George North (born 1992), Wales rugby union international, was born in King's Lynn.
- Barbara Parker (born 1982), Olympic track and field athlete, was born and educated in King's Lynn.
- Lucy Pearson (born 1972), women's test cricketer and educationalist, was born in King's Lynn.
- Ali Price (born 1993), Scotland Rugby Union player, born in King's Lynn.
- Miranda Raison (born 1977), actress
- William Richards (1749–1818), Baptist minister, wrote a history of Lynn.
- Edward Villiers Rippingille (c. 1790–1859), genre and portrait painter, was born in King's Lynn of farming parents.
- Joan G. Robinson (1910–1988), children's writer, lived in King's Lynn with her writer husband Richard Gavin Robinson.
- George Russell (born 1998), Formula One driver for Mercedes AMG Petronas F1 Team was born in King's Lynn
- Martin Saggers (born 1972), England cricketer and umpire, was born and raised in King's Lynn.
- Hardiman Scott (1920–1999), journalist, broadcaster and novelist, was born in King's Lynn.
- Helen Slatter (born 1970), Olympic swimmer, was born in King's Lynn.
- Roger Taylor (born 1949) musician and drummer of Queen, born in King's Lynn.
- Adam Thoroughgood (1604–1640), leading colonist in Virginia Colony, was born and raised in Lynn.
- Simon Thurley (born 1962), architectural historian and head of English Heritage, owns a second home in King's Lynn.
- Gwladys Sutherst Townshend (1884–1959), Marchioness of Townshend, served as Mayor of King's Lynn in 1929.
- George Vancouver (1757–1798), naval officer and explorer after whom Vancouver, BC, is named, was born in Lynn.
- Lucy Verasamy (born 1980), TV weather forecaster, attended King Edward VII School.

== In popular culture ==
Ruth Galloway, fictional heroine of Elly Griffiths' novels, is a forensic anthropologist living in a cottage near King's Lynn and teaching at the fictional University of North Norfolk.

Peter Grainger's DC Smith Investigation series of detective novels is set in "Kings Lake", a thinly-disguised King's Lynn.

The fictional comedy character Alan Partridge was born in Queen Elizabeth Hospital, King's Lynn. The character itself, played by Steve Coogan, grew up in Norwich and frequently makes references to Norfolk.

== Film and media appearances ==
King's Lynn and its surroundings have been popular with film and TV producers since the early 20th century. Its well-preserved medieval elements, complemented by Georgian and Victorian architecture and a varied landscape, have enabled it to serve as a stand-in for a wide range of settings. During wartime dramas, in particular, it has represented locations such as the Netherlands and France. The town appeared as the Netherlands in The Silver Fleet (1943) and One of Our Aircraft Is Missing (1942), as Germany in Operation Crossbow (1965), starring Sophia Loren, George Peppard, and Trevor Howard, and featured in the long-running BBC comedies 'Allo 'Allo! and Dad's Army, portraying occupied France and, in the episode The Two and a Half Feathers, a North African Sudanese desert scene, respectively.

The town served as 1776 New York in the 1985 feature film Revolution, starring Al Pacino. Although Out of Africa (1985), starring Robert Redford and Meryl Streep, was primarily filmed in Kenya, scenes set in Denmark were shot at Castle Rising near King's Lynn. The castle itself was transformed to represent a Danish castle, standing in for rural Denmark in the early 20th century. King's Lynn was also a filming location for television series such as the BBC's Lovejoy, Anglia Television's Tales Of The Unexpected, and Granada's Sherlock Holmes, starring Jeremy Brett. In the summer of 2018, the historical comedy-drama film The Personal History of David Copperfield was filmed on location in the maritime town of King's Lynn.

In the early 2000s, the BBC used the town bus station, local roads and the nearby Royal estate of Sandringham in the comedy-drama series Grass, featuring Simon Day. It has also featured on programmes such as the BBC's Antiques Road Trip, Flog It! and a BBC Four documentary The Last Journey of the Magna Carta King, which follows the trail of King John of England and the loss of his crown jewels while crossing one of the tidal estuaries that once flowed into The Wash, between King's Lynn and Sutton Bridge.

- King's Lynn Minster (St Margaret's)
- King's Lynn Power Station
- List of buildings in King's Lynn
- List of people from King's Lynn
