= Tim FitzHigham =

British comedian, author, artist and world record holder

- Notable work: In The Bath, aka All at Sea; Don Quixote

Comedy career
- Years active: 1998–present
- Medium: Comedian, author, world record holder, radio
- Website: fitzhigham.com

Notes
- Nominated for 1999 Perrier Comedy Award for best newcomer.

Tim FitzHigham (/fɪtsˈhaɪəm/ fits-HYE-əm) FRSA FRGS is an English comedian, author, artist and world record holder. The feats he has performed include paddling a paper boat down 257.5 km of the River Thames, rowing a bathtub across the English Channel, and inflating the world's largest man-inflated balloon. Since 2017 he worked to keep the UK's oldest working theatre open and in 2022 he was appointed the creative director of Guildhall of St George. In this role he delivers the £30.5 million redevelopment of the Guildhall to create a cultural centre with a Shakespearean theatre as its centrepiece.

== Career ==
FitzHigham began telling funny stories in a rum shop in the West Indies while working as a pig and nutmeg farmer; this may have been the beginnings of his work as a stand-up comedian. Back in the UK in 1999, he performed at the Edinburgh Festival Fringe with James Cary and Jonny Saunders in "Infinite Number of Monkeys – Sketch Comedy of Hypotheticals", where he was nominated for the Perrier Comedy Award (now the Edinburgh Comedy Award) for best newcomer. In 2000 he established Infinite Number of Monkeys as a production company and in the same year won a Spirit of the Fringe Award. His live shows, with topics ranging from the Kama Sutra to Morris dancing, have been made Critic's Choice in various newspapers, including The Times, The Sunday Times, The Daily Telegraph, The Independent, The Guardian, The Observer, The Scotsman, Scotland on Sunday, The Evening Standard, Time Out and Metro.

From around 2005 FitzHigham and Andrew Maxwell hosted a late night comedy show at The Comedy Store and also the Edinburgh Festival. It was described by Maxwell as a "late night howling cult" and by FitzHigham as a "late night Hammer Horror Hip Hop Muppet Show". It was initially called Maxwell's Fullmooners then simply Fullmooners. It featured break dancers, a chanteuse and comedians including Simon Pegg, Jimmy Carr, Dara O'Briain, Ed Byrne, Jason Bryne and Jim Jeffries. It has often been quoted as the late night show by which others have been rated. The last publicly recorded Fullmooners was to a sold out McEwan Hall in Edinburgh.

The solo shows he has performed include Don Quixote, in which he attempted to live like a medieval knight errant in celebration of the 400th anniversary of the publication of the novel Don Quixote. As a guest on BBC Radio 4's The Museum of Curiosity, he donated the novel Don Quixote to the museum. Eventually it was decided that Don Quixote would be better suited as the security guard on the museum steps where he could do less damage.

In 2011, he was nominated for the Malcolm Hardee Cunning Stunt Award at the Edinburgh Festival Fringe for his live show The Gambler. The Guardian's Brian Logan wrote, "his unflappable pluck in the face of impossible (or at least ridiculous) odds seldom fails to amuse".

In 2012, he was nominated for the Malcolm Hardee Act Most Likely to Make a Million Quid Award at the Edinburgh Fringe. He lost to the now millionaire Trevor Noah.

In 2013 he presented CBBC science show Super Human Challenge, in which he ran across Death Valley, pulled a double decker bus and tried arrow catching. During this FitzHigham recorded the highest measured resting tolerance to G-force.

His live show about historical gambling became a BBC Radio 4 series called Tim FitzHigham: The Gambler. The 2013 pilot episode involved a bet from 1753 and his nemesis Alex Horne. Since then, two four-part series of The Gambler have been made for BBC Radio 4 (first broadcast in 2014 and 2015), with repeats on Radio 4 Extra.

Alex Horne and FitzHigham have a long-standing wager concerning who can live the longer; FitzHigham is currently winning by two years.

After drinking a pint of claret, FitzHigham came joint-first in the initial live version of Horne brainchild Taskmaster, losing to Mike Wozniak in a nod-off. FitzHigham has never appeared in the TV version of the show. Backstage after the live show, FitzHigham won a side bet with Horne that he would place in the top three. It has become a long-running joke between Mark Watson and FitzHigham that he is the only original member of the live show not to appear on the TV version (there are others, with Stuart Goldsmith being one).

In 2017 the new comedy project FitzHigham mentored for BBC Radio Norfolk began broadcasting on BBC Radio Suffolk and in November won support from the director general Tony Hall. FitzHigham was appointed to mentor a similar project for BBC Essex.

Since 2017 FitzHigham has been involved in the project to keep the UK's oldest working theatre open and running. It is called the Guildhall of St George in King's Lynn and has a first recorded performance in 1445. He is a founding trustee of Shakespeare's Guildhall Trust (King's Lynn). As of 2022 he was the creative director of Guildhall of St George. In this role he delivers the redevelopment of the Guildhall to create a cultural centre with a Shakespearean theatre as its centrepiece.

During the renovation project in 2023, a wooden floor was uncovered at the theatre which was highly likely the flooring in place when Shakespeare performed there in 1592-93. Tree-ring dating and a survey of how the building was assembled date the floorboards to between 1417 and 1430. It survived under a later floor.

== Feats ==
River Thames paper boat

FitzHigham holds several world records and has achieved many unusual feats. The first was achieved in 2003, when he paddled a paper boat down 160 miles of the River Thames in order to raise money for Comic Relief. Having set out with an initial goal of raising £500, the international attention the stunt received resulted in thousands of pounds in donations. His boat Lillibet is now in the collection of the National Maritime Museum Cornwall. The record, for a boat, constructed out of brown paper and inflated animal bladders, had stood for 383 years, having been set in 1619 by John Taylor, a Jacobean poet and River Thames waterman.

English Channel bathtub rowing

His second such feat was being the first person to row a bathtub across the English Channel. His first attempt was in 2004 for Sport Relief, when he tried to row from France to Tower Bridge, London, in a bathtub made by Thomas Crapper and Co. Ltd, named "Lilibet II", after the childhood nickname of Queen Elizabeth II. However, a storm on 14 July consisting of Force 6 winds resulted in the attempt failing and bathtub being damaged. In 2005, FitzHigham made a second attempt, this time for Comic Relief, and successfully crossed. He later wrote about the experience in his first book, In The Bath, later retitled All at Sea, and the story was turned into a show that was performed at the Fringe. In honour of the event, Thomas Crapper and Co. Ltd made a special lavatory named after him. It is only the second commemorative lavatory in history, the other being made for Queen Victoria's jubilee.

Longest washing line

In June 2006, FitzHigham, along with impressionist Alistair McGowan, the UK Environment Agency and the United Nations set new British and European records assembling the longest washing line in the country in Trafalgar Square, London. It was done in order to raise awareness environmental issues and UN World Environment Day.

Largest man-inflated balloon

In November 2006, FitzHigham inflated the world's largest man-inflated balloon to raise awareness of environmental issues, which held 19,000 pints of air. During the attempt he fainted twice within two hours.

== Other media ==
FitzHigham appears with a paper boat in Time Team, two series of Zapped (TV series) and as King Arthur in The Windsors. He also appeared as a potter in a long running advert for Purplebricks

In film, he appeared in Paddington 2 as the magician and grandfather of Hugh Grant's character, and as a drunk actor in the DVD cut of The Wolfman, alongside Benicio del Toro. He played himself in the cinema release of Hereafter starring Matt Damon and directed by Clint Eastwood. His book All at Sea is also featured in the film. He also starred in Morgan Flynn – a short by Academy Award-nominated director Tanel Toom.

== Titles ==
Other than his records, FitzHigham has been recognized in various ways. These include being a Freeman of the City of London, Freeman of the Company of Watermen and Lightermen of the River Thames, Fellow of the Royal Society of Art, Fellow of the Royal Geographical Society, the Commodore of Sudbury Quay, Pittancer of Selby and Most Puissant Knight de Santa Maria.
