= Majestic Cinema, King's Lynn =

Cinema in King's Lynn, England

Majestic Cinema
- Majestic Cinema Centre
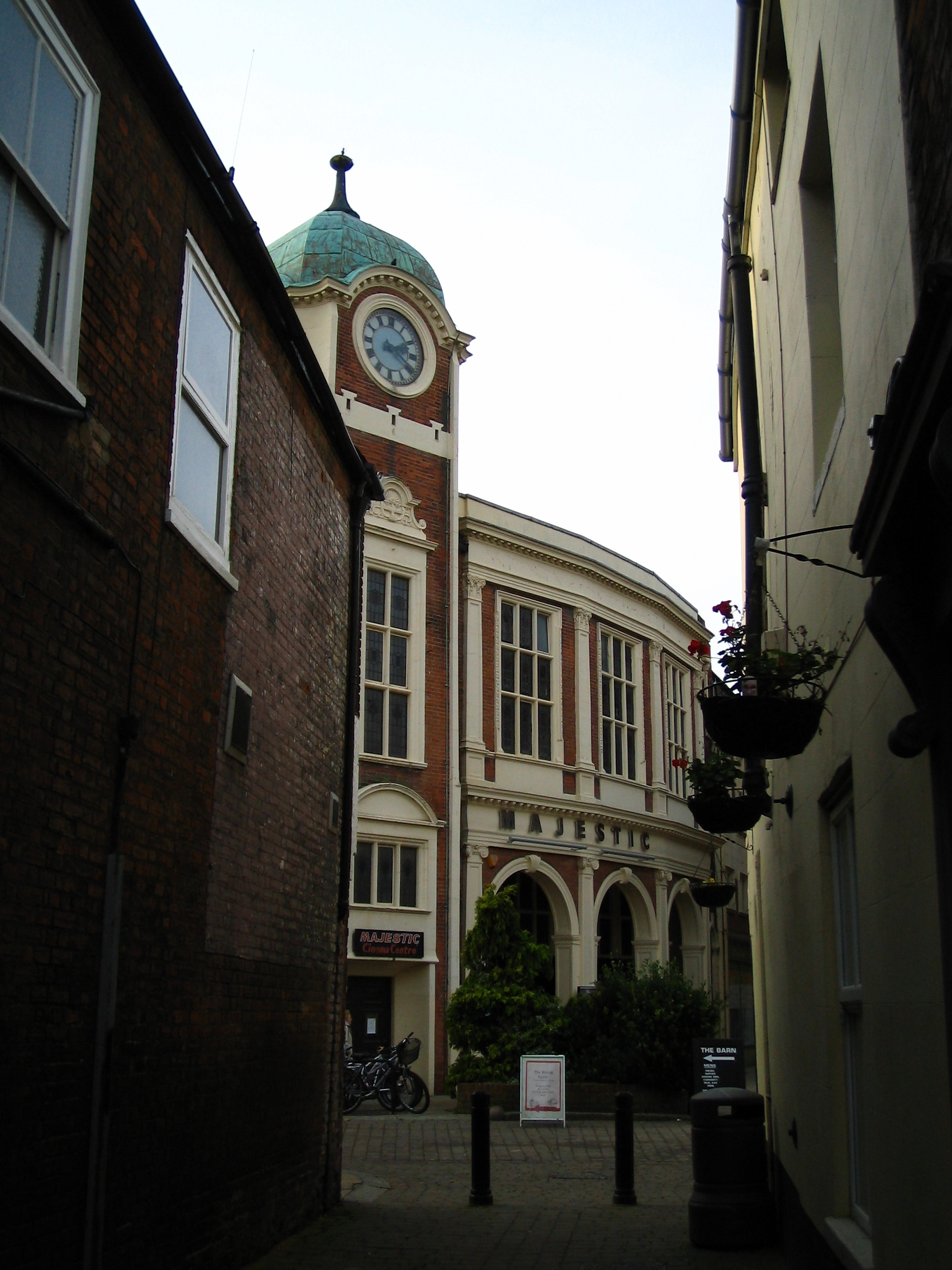
- The Majestic Cinema in 2006

- Location within Norfolk

General information
- Location: Norfolk, United Kingdom, Majestic Cinema; Tower Street; King's Lynn; Norfolk; PE30 1EJ, King's Lynn, United Kingdom
- Coordinates: 52.752990°N 0.397540°E
- Owner: Paul Jervis

Website
- www.majestic-cinema.co.uk

The Majestic Cinema is a cinema in King's Lynn, Norfolk, England.

== History ==
The Majestic Cinema was built in 1928 and run by Ernest Ralph Adams of Ripley House, King's Lynn. He worked closely with the architects John Lewis Carnell and William Dymoke White in the design and construction of the Majestic. Mr. Adams bought the contents of the Empire Theatre, Leicester Square, London (which was being demolished) and these, once restored, formed part of the interior of the Majestic. The 'Picture House' (as it was initially known) opened on May 23, 1928, with the silent film version of 'Ben Hur', starring Ramon Navarro. The ownership of the cinema later passed to Union and subsequently ABC Cinemas. The original ballroom was used as a venue by King George V for his Sandringham Hunt Balls.

=== 2001: Multiplex demolition proposal ===
In 2001, a scheme to demolish the Majestic Cinema and build a Multiplex in its place was denied. The plans were submitted to the Borough Council of King's Lynn and West Norfolk by SMM Investments. Objectors to the cinemas demolition included the Lynn Civic Society, the national Cinema and Theatre Association, the Theatres Trust and councillor Dr Paul Richards. The owner of the Majestic Cinema at the time, Tony Rowlett stated in an interview with Lynn News:

"Pulling [the building] down could never happen because it is a listed building and it is not something I would want to see in my wildest dreams."

— Tony Rowlett, Lynn News

It was made a Grade II listed building in 2001 following lobbying by the Lynn's Civic Society.

A report explaining the plans refusal stated:

"There is no alternative but to refuse the application on the basis of the lack of information and the potential harm to the listed cinema, the street scene and the conservation area."
