= William Baly =

English physician

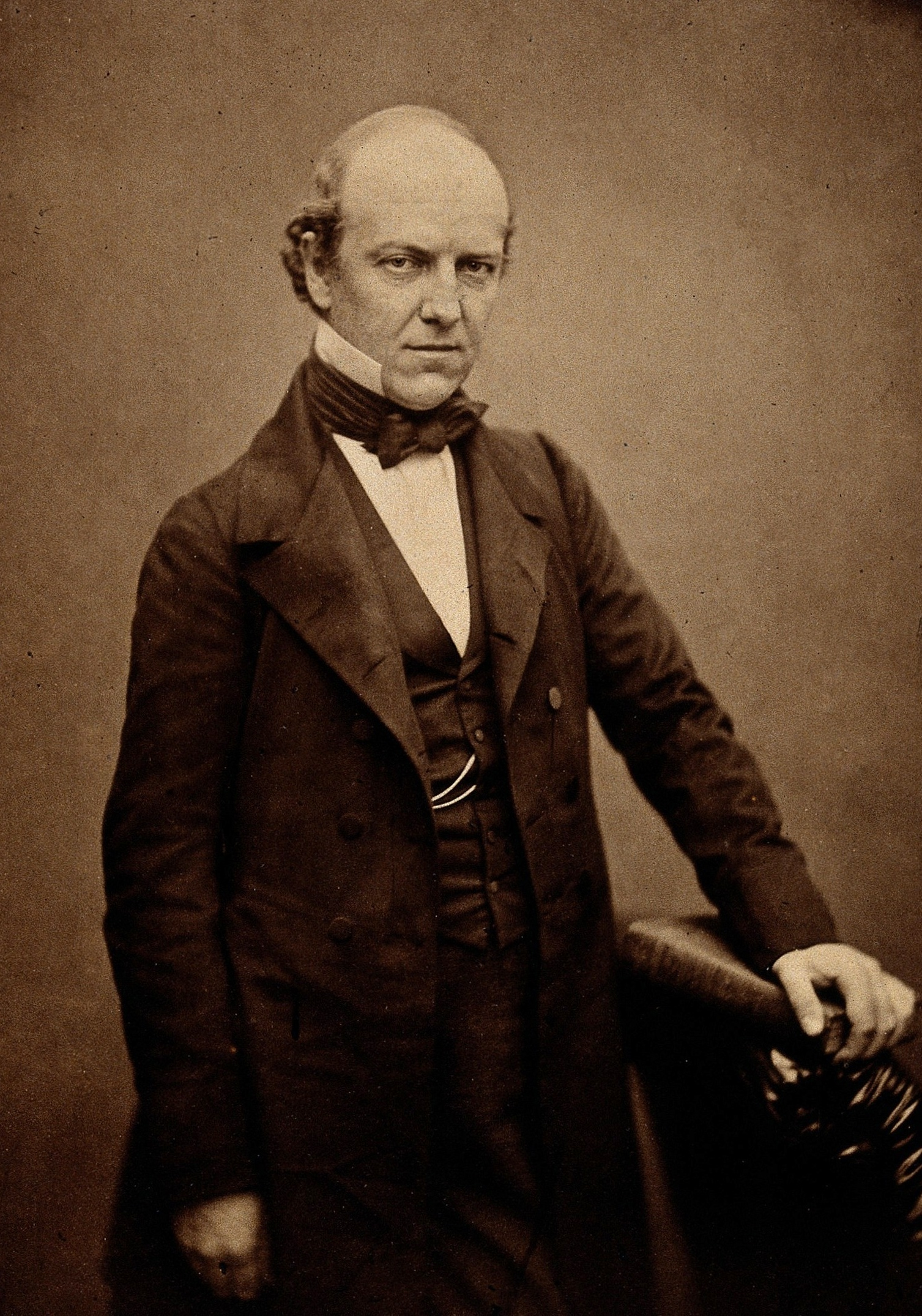
William Baly

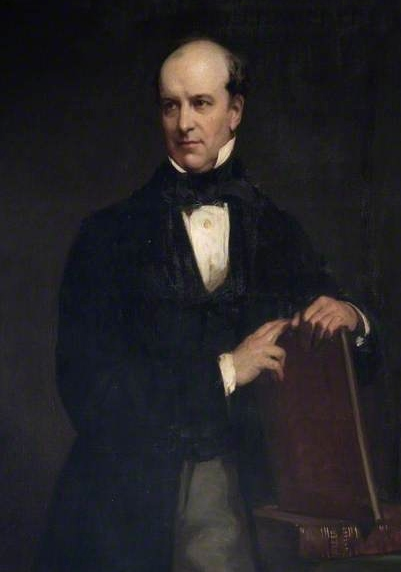
William Baly by John Prescott Knight, 1863

William Baly (1814 – 28 January 1861) was an English physician.

He was born in King's Lynn, Norfolk. After completing his medical studies at the Royal College of Surgeons and the Society of Apothecaries, he furthered his education in Paris, Heidelberg and Berlin. After receiving his doctorate from the University of Berlin in 1836, Baly returned to London and opened a private practice. Later he was a lecturer and physician at St. Bartholomew's Hospital, and in 1859 was appointed "physician extraordinary" to Queen Victoria.

Baly performed significant research on dysentery and cholera. In the 1840s he worked as a prison physician at Millbank Penitentiary, and published an important treatise on diseases and hygiene involving prisons. Also he published an English translation of Johannes Peter Muller's Handbuch der Physiologie des Menschen as "Elements of Physiology". He was elected a Fellow of the Royal Society in 1847 and Goulstonian lecturer on dysentery at the Royal College of Surgeons the same year.

Baly was killed in a railway accident near Wimbledon, southwest of London, on 28 January 1861; he is buried in the Kensal Green Cemetery, London.

Baly was a fellow of the Royal College of Physicians of London, which awards a biennial Baly Medal in Physiology, in his name.

== Works ==
- "Elements of Physiology", (Translation with Notes by William Baly, author: Johannes Peter Muller, translator: William Baly) (2 vols. London, 1838–42)
- "Diseases in Prisons", Medico-Chirurgical Transactions, (vol. XXVIII, 1845)
- "Recent Advances in the Physiology of Motion, the Senses, Generation, and Development. Being a Supplement to the 2nd Volume of Professor Muller's Elements of Physiology" (London, 1848)
- "Reports on Epidemic Cholera" (2 parts) (London, 1854)
