= Henry Bell (architect) =

British architect

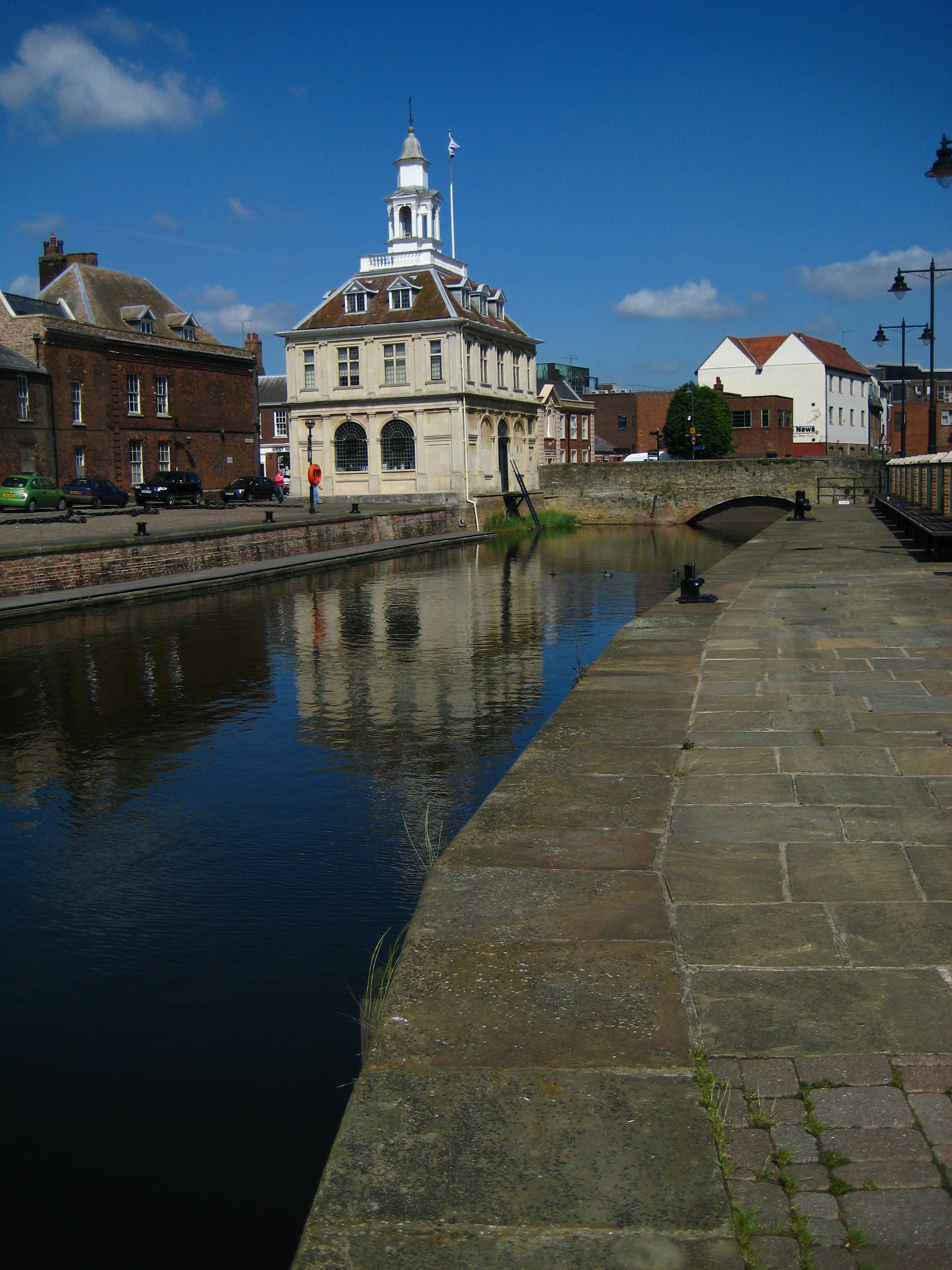
The Custom House in King's Lynn, one of Bell's most famous designs

Henry Bell (1647–1711) was an English architect, a contemporary of Christopher Wren.

Bell was born in King's Lynn, Norfolk and baptised in St Margaret's Church. He was the son of a wealthy merchant family and his father was twice mayor. He was admitted to Gonville and Caius College, Cambridge in 1661.

He designed many buildings in West Norfolk including the Custom House in King's Lynn and All Saints Church in North Runcton.

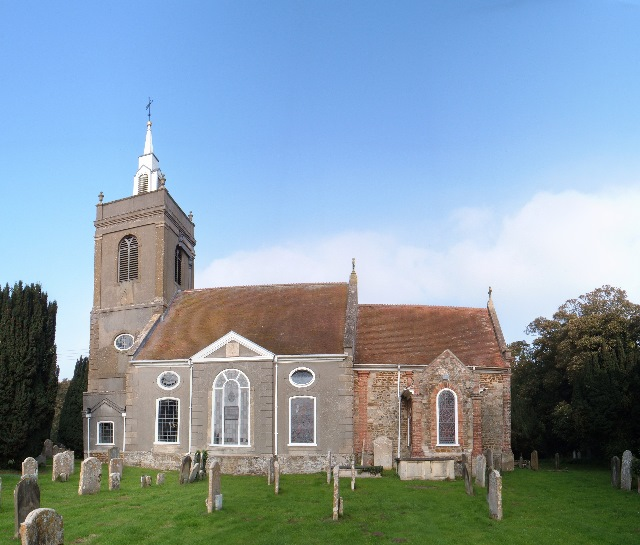
All Saints' Parish church, North Runcton

He served twice as Mayor of King's Lynn, he was well educated and travelled through Europe. In 1676 he met Robert Hooke, who shared with him his experiences of rebuilding London following the Great Fire. This knowledge had a bearing on his future work, as the design of North Runcton Church shows similarities with those employed by Wren, for example St Mary-at-Hill. He was responsible for the rebuilding of All Saints' Church and possibly the Sessions House, Northampton after a fire.

During 1690 and 1695 the Kimbolton Castle courtyard was remodelled and attributed on stylistic grounds to Henry Bell who refronted the Tudor courtyard, introduced galleries and the main staircase.

He died in 1711.
