= HMS Sparrowhawk (1856) =

Gunvessel of the Royal Navy

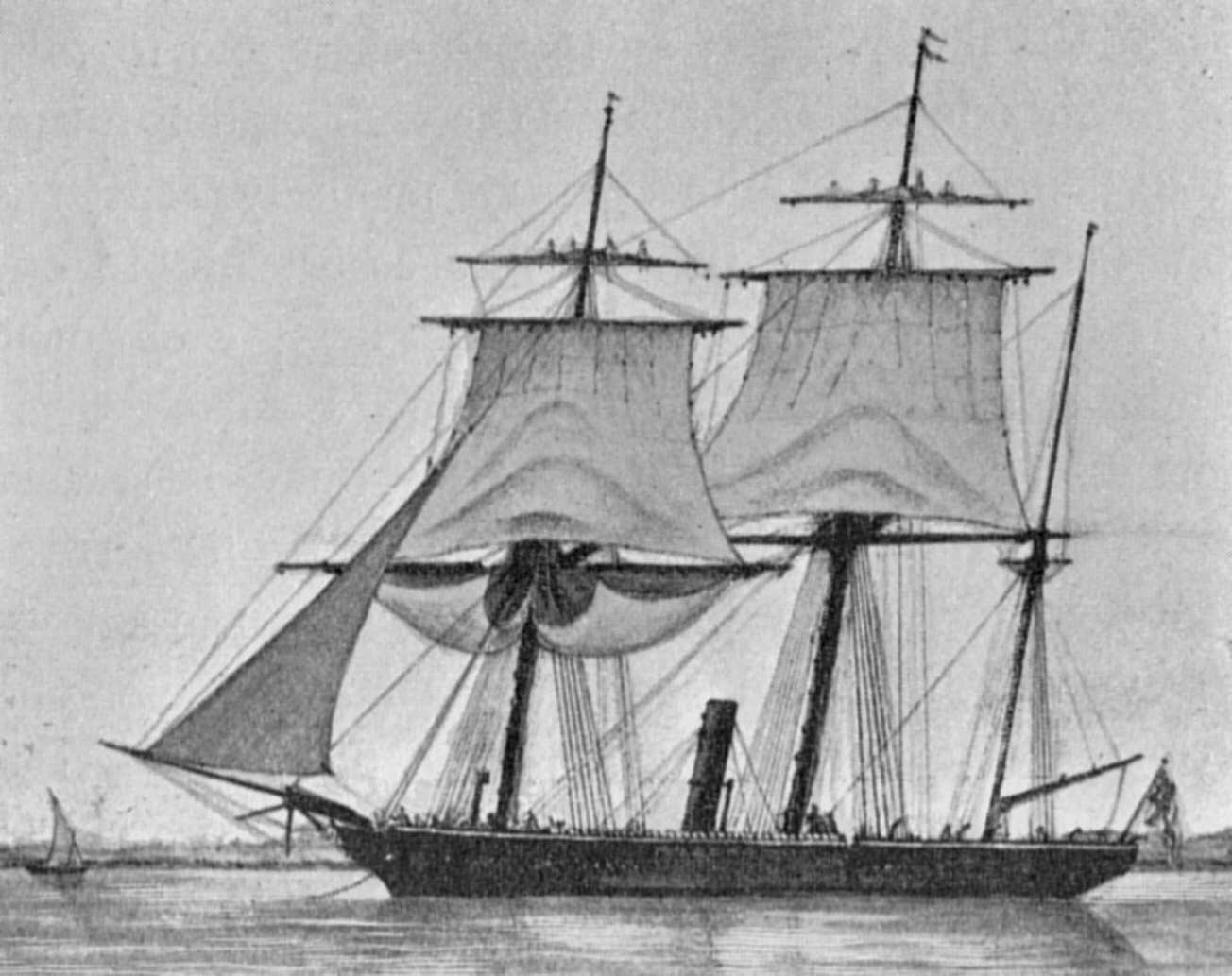
- Sparrowhawk's sister-ship, Surprise

History

United Kingdom
- Name: HMS Sparrowhawk
- Ordered: 26 July 1855
- Builder: Young, Magnay & Co., Limehouse; Engines by Humphrys, Tennant & Dykes
- Laid down: 6 August 1855
- Launched: 9 February 1856
- Completed: By 7 April 1856
- Fate: Sold in 1872

General characteristics
- Class & type: Vigilant-class second-class despatch/gunvessel
- Displacement: 860 tons
- Tons burthen: 669 79/94 bm
- Length: 180 ft (54.9 m) (gundeck); 160 ft 7.5 in (49.0 m) (keel)
- Beam: 28 ft 4 in (8.6 m)
- Draught: 8 ft (2.4 m) (designed)
- Depth of hold: 14 ft (4.27 m)
- Installed power: 200 nominal horsepower; 726 ihp (541 kW)
- Propulsion: 2-cylinder horizontal single-expansion steam engine; Single screw
- Sail plan: Barque-rigged
- Speed: 11 kn (20 km/h) under steam
- Complement: 80
- Armament: As designed: 2 × 68-pounder Lancaster guns on pivots; 2 × 12-pdr howitzers; As completed: 1 × 7-inch/110-pdr breech loader; 1 x68-pdr muzzle-loading rifle; 2 × 20-pdr breech loaders

HMS Sparrowhawk was a Vigilant-class second-class despatch/gunvessel launched on 9 February 1856 at Limehouse, England and served at various stations in the Far East. By the spring of 1865, her rig was a converted to that of a three-masted barque. She was sold in 1872, converted to a sailing barque in mercantile service, and was later a coal lighter in Australia.

== Design ==
Her class were designed as second-class despatch and gunvessels. They were intended to operate close inshore during the Crimean War and were essentially enlarged versions of the Arrow-class gunvessel, which has been designed by the Surveyor’s Department in 1854.

=== Propulsion ===
A two-cylinder horizontal single expansion steam engine by Humphrys, Tennant and Dykes provided 726 indicated horsepower (541 kW) through a single screw, and gave a top speed of about 11 knots.

=== Sail plan ===
All Vigilant-class gunvessels were barque-rigged.

=== Armament ===
Although designed with a pair of 68-pounder Lancaster muzzle-loading rifles, the Vigilant class were finished with one 7-inch (180 mm)/110-pound (50 kg) Armstrong breech-loading gun, one 68-pound (31 kg) Lancaster muzzle-loading rifled gun and two 20-pounder breech loaders.

== Service history ==
Porcher Island, near Prince Rupert, British Columbia, is named after Edwin Augustus Porcher (1821–1878), who served as captain of HMS Sparrowhawk at Esquimalt Naval Base, Vancouver Island, from the spring of 1865 until he returned to England in autumn 1868. While serving with the North Pacific Squadron, Commander Porcher made four summertime voyages to the North Coast of British Columbia - in 1866, 1867 and twice in 1868.

== Sale and further service ==
Sparrowhawk was sold by auction at Esquimalt on 20 November 1872, for about £4,000, to Corbett (or Corbitt) and Company of Portland, Oregon. Her engines were used to power a sawmill owned by Sewell Moody at Moodyville, British Columbia. In 1873 the ship was registered as a 3-masted sailing barque at the port of Victoria, British Columbia with Official Number 64142. In 1876 Sparrowhawk was sold to William Morley of Melbourne, Victoria for his coastal coal trade, but was put up for sale with the rest of his business after his death in 1877. In June 1878 the business was bought by Huddart Parker and Company of Geelong and in 1881 Sparrowhawk was reduced to coal lighter.

On 7 April 1892, while berthed at Melbourne, Sparrowhawk was run into by the steamship Flinders and sank in the Yarra River. She was raised, repaired, and later in service with Jeremiah O'Sullivan of West Melbourne. In 1917 Sparrowhawk's registration was closed as "dismantled and broken up in Saltwater River, at date unknown".
