= HMS Ringdove (1856) =

Gunvessel of the Royal Navy

History

United Kingdom
- Name: HMS Ringdove
- Ordered: 26 July 1855
- Builder: J & R White, Cowes
- Cost: £31,748
- Launched: 22 February 1856
- Commissioned: 31 May 1856
- Decommissioned: 10 November 1864
- Fate: Sold on 2 June 1865 and broken up by White at Cowes in November 1866

General characteristics
- Class & type: Vigilant-class second-class despatch/gunvessel
- Displacement: 860 tons
- Tons burthen: 669 79/94 bm
- Length: 180 ft (54.9 m) (gundeck); 160 ft 7.5 in (49.0 m) (keel)
- Beam: 28 ft 4 in (8.6 m)
- Draught: 8 ft (2.4 m) (designed)
- Depth of hold: 14 ft (4.27 m)
- Installed power: 200 nominal horsepower; 677 ihp (505 kW)
- Propulsion: 2-cylinder horizontal single-expansion steam engine; Single screw
- Sail plan: Barque-rigged
- Speed: 11 kn (20 km/h) under steam
- Complement: 90
- Armament: As designed: 2 × 68-pounder Lancaster guns on pivots; 2 × 12-pdr howitzers; As completed: 1 × 7-inch/110-pdr breech loader; 1 × 68-pdr muzzle-loading rifle; 2 × 20-pdr breech loaders

HMS Ringdove was a Vigilant-class gunvessel of the Royal Navy. She was launched by J. Samuel White, Cowes in 1856 and broken up in Cowes in 1866.

== Design ==
Her class were designed as second-class despatch and gunvessels. They were intended to operate close inshore during the Crimean War and were essentially enlarged versions of the Arrow-class gunvessel, which has been designed by the Surveyor’s Department in 1854.

A two-cylinder horizontal single expansion steam engine by Miller Ravenhill & Co. provided 677 indicated horsepower (505 kW) through a single screw. All Vigilant-class gunvessels were barque-rigged. Although designed with a pair of 68-pounder Lancaster muzzle-loading rifles, the Vigilant class were finished with one 7-inch (180 mm)/110-pound (50 kg) Armstrong breech-loading gun, one 68-pound (31 kg) Lancaster muzzle-loading rifled gun and two 20-pounder breech loaders.

== Service ==
In February 1856, Ringdove was assigned under the command of Commander Isaac Newton Thomas Saulez. On 20 September 1856, command was transferred to Commander Robert George Craigie.

In June 1861, Ringdove entered the Seto Inland Sea, where she performed soundings and naming. By July, she was stationed in Edo Bay during the Mito rōnin attack on the British Legation in Tōzen-ji. After the incident, Laurence Oliphant, who survived the attack, joined Craigie on Ringdove for a reconnaissance mission in Tsushima. Craigie reported to Admiral James Hope the activities of Russians in the area, leading to the withdrawal of Russian troops from Tsushima in autumn 1861.

By April 1862, Ringdove was anchored off the British Consulate in the Chinese city of Ningbo, which was occupied by the Taiping Heavenly Kingdom. On 22 April, the Taiping troops celebrated the arrival of General Fan Youzeng from Nanking. The celebrations which involved the firing several poorly-aimed musket shots. Some of the shots narrowly missed Ringdove. Craigie wrote to the Taiping generals and Admiral Hope to complain. Despite Craigie receiving profuse apologies from General Huang Chengzhong, Roderick Dew, commander of the British forces, demanded that the east-facing Taiping batteries to be dismantled. The demands were not met, and eventually escalated to the retaking of Ningbo on 10 May. During the battle, Ringdove took down the guns at the North Gate of the city. After the battle, she was placed about 25 miles up the Yong River, to prevent Taiping retaliation on civilians.

Craigie died on September 15 1862. The next day, command was transferred to Commander Ralph Abercrombie Otho Brown, until her decommissioning on 10 November 1864.
