= HMS Surprise (1856) =

Gunvessel of the Royal Navy

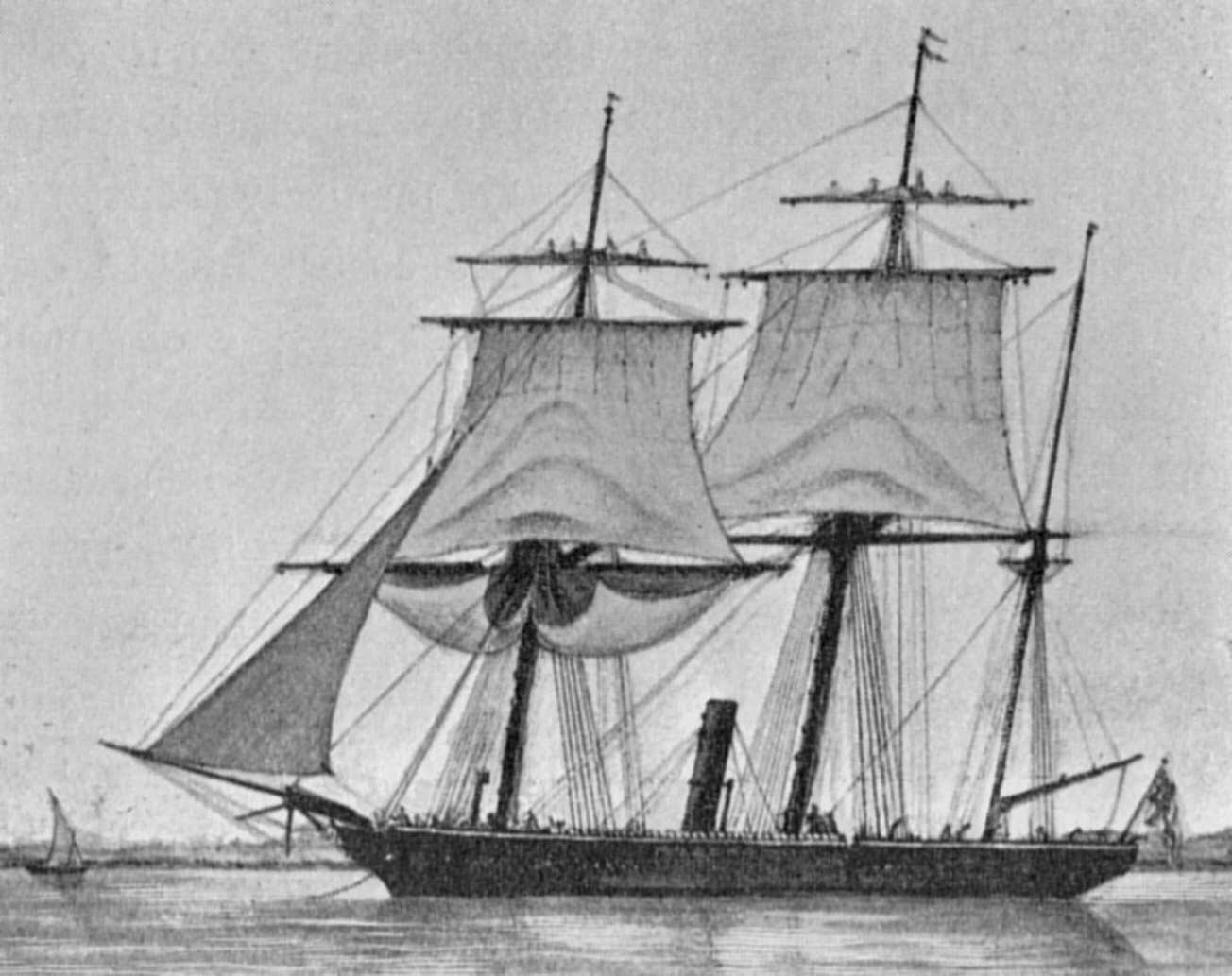

History

United Kingdom
- Name: HMS Surprise
- Ordered: 26 July 1855
- Builder: Money Wigram and Son of Blackwall Yard
- Cost: £33,356
- Laid down: 30 August 1855
- Launched: 6 March 1856
- Commissioned: 12 April 1856
- Fate: Broken up in 1866

General characteristics
- Class & type: Vigilant-class second-class despatch/gunvessel
- Displacement: 860 tons
- Tons burthen: 669 79/94 bm
- Length: 180 ft (54.9 m) (gundeck); 160 ft 7.5 in (49.0 m) (keel)
- Beam: 28 ft 4 in (8.6 m)
- Draught: 8 ft (2.4 m) (designed)
- Depth of hold: 14 ft (4.27 m)
- Installed power: 200 nominal horsepower; 778 ihp (580 kW)
- Propulsion: 2-cylinder horizontal single-expansion steam engine; Single screw
- Sail plan: Barque-rigged
- Speed: 11 kn (20 km/h) under steam
- Complement: 80
- Armament: As designed: 2 × 68-pounder Lancaster guns on pivots; 2 × 12-pdr howitzers; As completed: 1 × 7-inch/110-pdr breech loader; 1 x68-pdr muzzle-loading rifle; 2 × 20-pdr breech loaders

HMS Surprise was a Vigilant-class gunvessel of the Royal Navy. She was launched at Blackwall Yard, London in 1856 and broken up in Plymouth in 1866.

== Design ==
Her class were designed as second-class despatch and gunvessels. They were intended to operate close inshore during the Crimean War and were essentially enlarged versions of the Arrow-class gunvessel, which has been designed by the Surveyor’s Department in 1854.

=== Propulsion ===
A two-cylinder horizontal single expansion steam engine by Miller, Ravenhill and Salkeld provided 778 indicated horsepower (580 kW) through a single screw, and gave a top speed of about 11 knots.

=== Sail plan ===
All Vigilant-class gunvessels were barque-rigged.

=== Armament ===
Although designed with a pair of 68-pounder Lancaster muzzle-loading rifles, the Vigilant class were finished with one 7-inch (180 mm)/110-pound (50 kg) Armstrong breech-loading gun, one 68-pound (31 kg) Lancaster muzzle-loading rifled gun and two 20-pounder breech loaders.

== Construction ==
Surprise was ordered on 26 July 1855 at the same time as nine others of her class. Her keel was laid at the Blackwall yard of Money Wigram & Son on 30 August and she was launched on 6 March 1856.

== History ==
From 18 March 1856 she was commanded by Commander Charles Egerton Harcourt-Vernon, and he commissioned her at Blackwall on 12 April the same year. From 1857 under Commander Cresswell the ship served in the East Indies including the Second Anglo-Chinese War, and from 1861 she formed part of the Mediterranean Fleet. Between August 1864 and 24 April 1866 she was commanded by George Tryon, later to become infamous as the Admiral who caused the loss in 1893 of his flagship HMS Victoria during fleet manoeuvres.

== Disposal ==
Surprise was sold to Marshall of Plymouth and broken up in November 1866.

== Commanding officers ==
From	Captain
18 March 1856	Commander Charles Egerton Harcourt-Vernon
11 March 1857	Commander Samuel Gurney Cresswell
2 August 1861	Commander William Henry Whyte
August 1864	Commander George Tryon

== Sources ==
- Lyon, David & Winfield, Rif (2004). The Sail and Steam Navy List: All the Ships of the Royal Navy 1815–1889. Chatham Publishing. ISBN 978-1-86176-032-6. OCLC 52620555.
- Preston, Antony; Major, John (2007). Send a Gunboat: The Victorian Navy and Supremacy at Sea, 1854–1904 (2nd ed.). London: Conway. ISBN 978-0-85177-923-2.
