= HMS Beagle (1854) =

Royal Navy Arrow-class gunvessel (1854–1863)

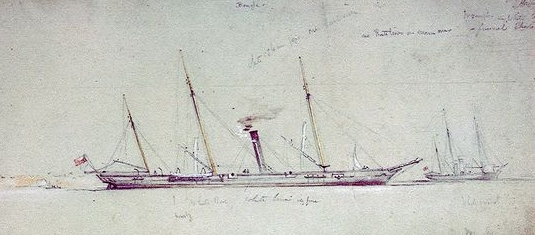
- An image of HMS Beagle and Wrangler by Sir Oswald Brierly, 1855

History

United Kingdom
- Name: Beagle
- Ordered: 10 April 1854
- Builder: C J Mare & Company, Leamouth, London
- Cost: £23,091; (Hull: £8,302 Machinery: £9,725)
- Laid down: 15 April 1854
- Launched: 20 July 1854
- Commissioned: 3 September 1854
- Fate: Sold to the Satsuma Domain in 1863

Japan
- Name: Kenkō (乾行)
- Acquired: 1863
- Fate: Broken up in 1889

General characteristics
- Class & type: Arrow-class gunvessel
- Displacement: 586 tons
- Tons burthen: 476 68/94 bm
- Length: 160 ft (48.8 m)
- Beam: 25 ft (7.6 m)
- Draught: 11 ft 8 in (3.6 m) (aft)
- Depth of hold: 13 ft 3 in (4.0 m)
- Installed power: 160 nhp
- Propulsion: 2-cylinder horizontal single-expansion steam engine; Single screw
- Sail plan: Barque-rigged
- Complement: 65
- Armament: 2 × 68-pounder (95 cwt) Lancaster MLR on pivots; 4 × 32-pounder (25 cwt) guns

HMS Beagle was a wooden-hulled Arrow-class second-class screw gunvessel launched in 1854 and sold in 1863. She was the third vessel of the Royal Navy to use the name.

== Design ==
The Crimean War sparked a sudden need for shallow-draught, manoeuvrable vessels for inshore work in the Baltic and the Black Sea. The Arrow class of six wooden-hulled screw steamers were built during 1854 to a design by the Surveyor's Department. Construction was undertaken at two commercial yards on the Thames, R & H Green and C J Mare & Company, both of Leamouth, London. Two further designs of Crimean War gunvessel were ordered during 1855, the Intrepid class and the Vigilant class. The class was built as despatch vessels, but in 1856 were re-designated as second-class gunvessels.

=== Propulsion ===
A two-cylinder horizontal single expansion steam engine supplied by Humphrys, Tennant and Dykes provided 160 horsepower (119 kW) through a single screw.

=== Sail plan ===
All Arrow-class gunvessels were barque-rigged.

=== Armament ===
The Arrow class were provided with two 68-pounder Lancaster muzzle-loading rifled guns weighing 95 long cwt (4,800 kg) on pivot mounts, and four 32-pounder 25 long cwt (1,300 kg) guns.

== Construction and career ==
Beagle was laid down at the Leamouth yard of C J Mare & Company on 15 April 1854 and launched on 20 July the same year. She was commissioned into the Royal Navy two months later on 3 September.

Beagle took part in the Crimean War from 1854 to 1856. During the Crimean War, two of her ship's company were awarded the Victoria Cross (VC) for their actions: Joseph Trewavas was awarded the VC for his actions in the Sea of Azov, and an acting-mate in Beagle, William Hewett, was awarded the VC for his actions in defending a shore battery.

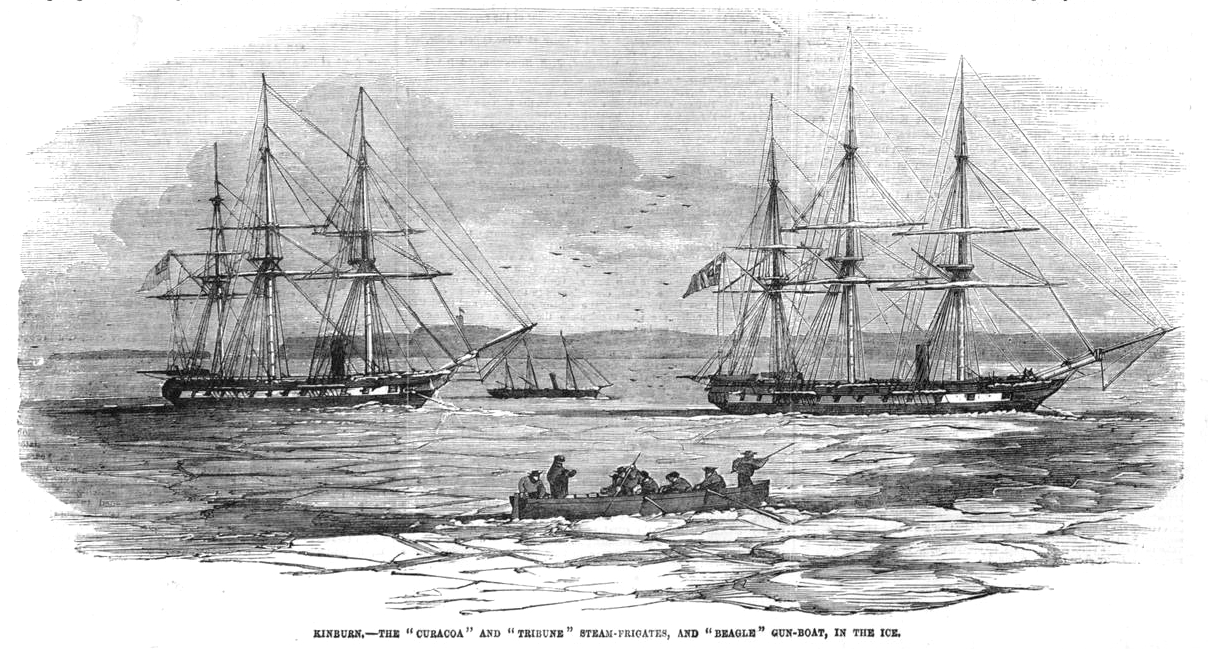
The Curacoa and Tribune steam-frigates, and Beagle gun-boat, in the ice, at Berezan Island, shortly after the Battle of Kinburn in December 1855. Illustrated London News

Beagle was sold to the Satsuma Domain (薩摩藩) of Japan at Hong Kong in 1863 to be used as a training vessel, and was renamed Kenkō (乾行) in 1865. She was broken up in 1889.

== Bibliography ==
- Jentschura, Hansgeorg; Jung, Dieter & Mickel, Peter (1977). Warships of the Imperial Japanese Navy, 1869–1945. Annapolis, Maryland: United States Naval Institute. ISBN 0-87021-893-X.
- Lengerer, Hans (2020). "The Kanghwa Affair and Treaty: A Contribution to the Pre-History of the Chinese–Japanese War of 1894–1895". Warship International. LVII (2). International Naval Research Organization: 110–131. ISSN 0043-0374.
- Lyon, David & Winfield, Rif (2004). The Sail and Steam Navy List: All the Ships of the Royal Navy 1815–1889. Chatham Publishing. ISBN 978-1-86176-032-6. OCLC 52620555.
