= 68-pounder (disambiguation) =

The term 68-pounder usually refers to a 68-pounder gun, a gun nominally firing ammunition weighing (or otherwise denominated at) 68 pounds.

68-pounder may also refer to:

- 68-pounder 95 cwt, One of the last smoothbore cannons used by the Royal Navy.
- 68-pounder Lancaster gun, an early rifled cannon firing 68 lb shot
- 68-pounder carronade, a size of carronade carried by some British ships of the line
