= Dominick Harrod =

British journalist and broadcaster

- Born: Dominick Roy Harrod; 21 August 1940; Oxford, England
- Died: 4 August 2013 (aged 72)
- Education: Dragon School; Westminster School
- Alma mater: Christ Church, Oxford
- Occupations: Journalist; broadcaster
- Employer(s): The Sunday Telegraph; The Daily Telegraph; BBC; Yorkshire Post
- Organization(s): Chartered Institute of Journalists; Garrick Club
- Known for: Television and newspaper economic correspondent
- Notable work: The Politics of Economics (1978); Making Sense of the Economy (1983)
- Television: BBC
- Spouse: Christina Hobhouse
- Children: 1 son
- Parents: Sir Roy Harrod (father); Wilhelmine Cresswell (mother)
- Relatives: Samuel Gurney Cresswell (great-great-great-uncle)

Dominick Roy Harrod (21 August 1940 – 4 August 2013) was a British journalist and broadcaster. He was the BBC's economic correspondent in the 1970s and 1980s.

== Early life ==
Born in Oxford, England, his parents were Sir Roy Harrod, the economist and biographer, and the former Wilhelmine Cresswell, known as "Billa" Harrod, who became a campaigner for the preservation of historic churches in Norfolk. Harrod would later be a founder member of the Norfolk Churches Trust with his mother, and was chairman of the Friends of Morston Church in Norfolk. Educated at The Dragon School, Oxford and Westminster School (where he edited the 'Clarion' magazine in 1957–58), Harrod read Philosophy, Politics and Economics at Christ Church, Oxford.

== Career ==
After graduating from Oxford, Harrod joined The Sunday Telegraph, writing the "Albany column" under Kenneth Rose. He later joined The Daily Telegraph, spending three years in the United States from 1966 as its Washington correspondent. Harrod was struck by a policeman's baton while covering the 1968 Chicago riots for the Telegraph.

Returning to London, Harrod was the Telegraph's economics correspondent, and left the paper to join the BBC in 1971. He remained at the BBC until 1993, only leaving to spend a year as director of information for the tyre manufacturer Dunlop Tyres. While at the BBC, Harrod interviewed every serving prime minister and chancellor of the exchequer. Following a period as the BBC's economics correspondent, he became economics editor for BBC Radio during the 1980s. Harrod was made redundant following changes under the Director-General of the BBC John Birt, but later participated in several budget reports for the broadcaster. While at the BBC, Harrod informally suggested “Harrod's Law of Economics”: "The more you see of me, the more trouble we're in."

Harrod spent a year as the city editor of the Yorkshire Post, and in 1994 became programme director of St George's House, a private institution for discussion founded by the Duke of Edinburgh. He retired from St George's House in 1998. He was elected a fellow of the Royal Society of Arts in 1992, and served on the council of the Save the Children Fund and on the Church of England's board for Social Responsibility. He was a long-standing member of the Broadcasting Division of the Chartered Institute of Journalists and served as President of the institute during 1994–95.

Harrod wrote two books on economics for a general readership, The Politics of Economics (1978) and Making Sense of the Economy (1983). In 2000, he wrote War, Ice and Piracy: The Remarkable Career of a Victorian Sailor about the Arctic exploration by his great-great-great-uncle, Samuel Gurney Cresswell, in the 1850s.

A member of the Garrick Club, Harrod was married to Christina Hobhouse from 1974 until her death in 1996; the couple had a son.

== Bibliography ==
- The Politics of Economics (1978)
- Making Sense of the Economy (1983)
- War, Ice and Piracy: The Remarkable Career of a Victorian Sailor (2000)
