= Vigilant-class gunvessel =

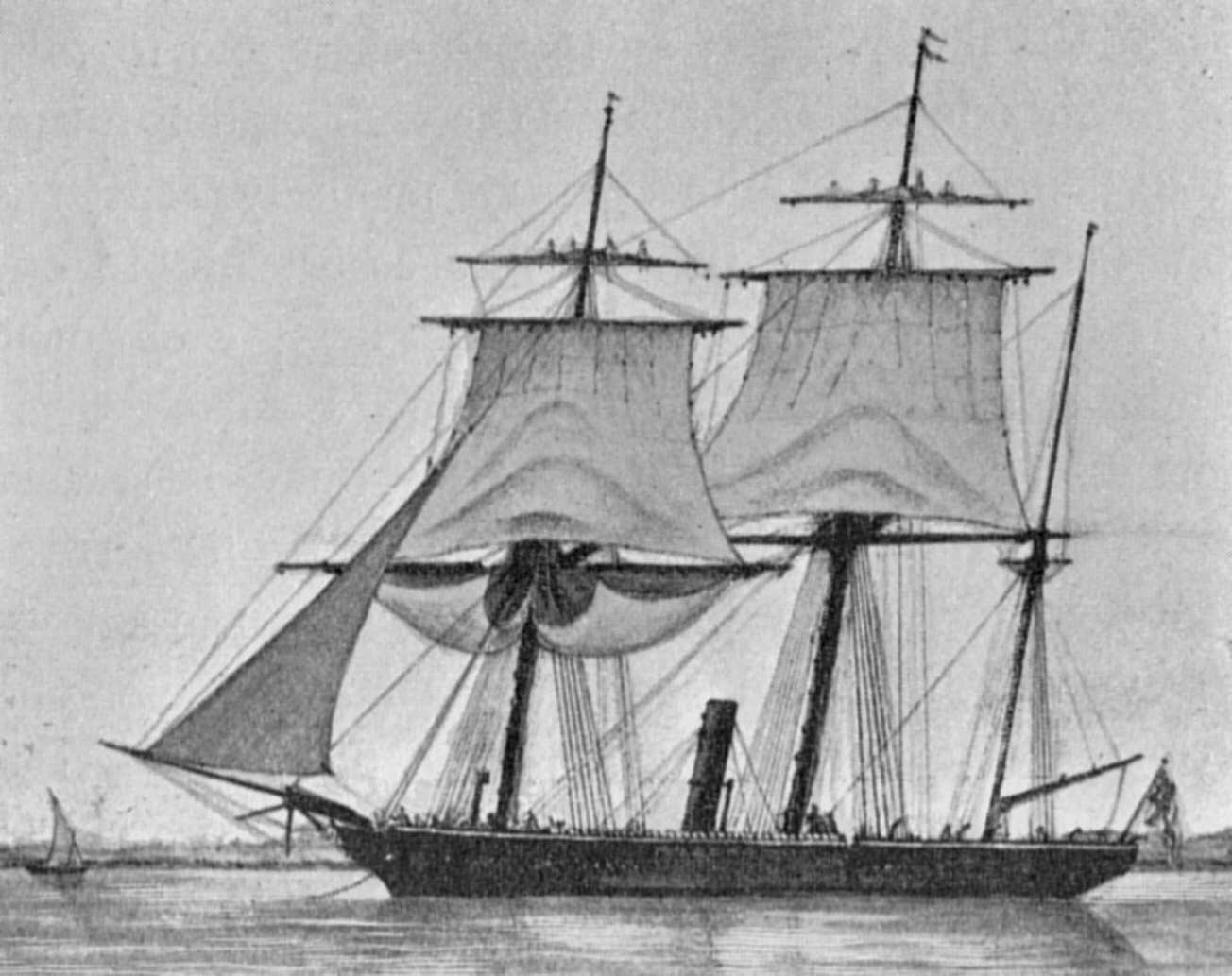
- Surprise

Class overview
- Name: Vigilant-class gunvessels
- Builders: C J Mare & Company, Leamouth; R & H Green, Blackwall Yard; J & R White, Cowes; Wigram & Son, Blackwall Yard; Young, Magnay & Co, Limehouse; Fletcher & Fearnall, Limehouse
- Operators: Royal Navy; (Qing dynasty) Chinese Imperial Customs; (Ottoman Empire) Egyptian Government
- Cost: £27,437 (Foxhound) - £33,906 (Renard)
- Built: 1855-1856
- In commission: 1856–1872
- Completed: 14
- Lost: 2

General characteristics
- Type: Second-class wooden gunvessel
- Displacement: 860 tonnes
- Tons burthen: 669 79/94 bm
- Length: 180 ft 0 in (54.9 m) (gundeck); 160 ft 7.5 in (49.0 m) (keel)
- Beam: 28 ft 4 in (8.6 m)
- Draught: 8 ft 0 in (2.4 m) (designed)
- Depth of hold: 14 ft 0 in (4.3 m)
- Installed power: 200 nhp; 593 to 778 ihp (442 to 580 kW)
- Propulsion: 2-cylinder horizontal single-expansion steam engine; Single screw
- Sail plan: Barque-rigged
- Speed: 11 kn (20.4 km/h)
- Complement: 80
- Armament: As designed: 2 × 68-pounder Lancaster guns on pivots; 2 × 12-pdr howitzers; As completed: 1 × 7-inch/110-pdr breech loader; 1 × 68-pdr muzzle-loading rifle; 2 × 20-pdr breech loaders

The Vigilant-class gunvessel of the Royal Navy was an enlarged version of the Arrow-class gunvessel of 1854. Both classes were designed for shallow-water operations in the Baltic and Black Seas during the Crimean War. Fourteen of the class were completed, but were ready too late to take part in that conflict. Cormorant was sunk in action at the Taku Forts, Osprey was wrecked on the coast of Africa in 1867 and the rest were all sold during the 1860s, with Sparrowhawk lasting until 1872.

== Design ==
The class were designed as second-class despatch and gunvessels. They were intended to operate close inshore during the Crimean War and were essentially enlarged versions of the Arrow-class gunvessel, which has been designed by the Surveyor’s Department in 1854.

=== Propulsion ===
A two-cylinder horizontal single expansion steam engine produced (varying between vessels) between 593 ihp (442 kW) and 778 ihp (580 kW) through a single screw, and gave a top speed of about 11 knots.

=== Sail plan ===
All Vigilant-class gunvessels were barque-rigged.

=== Armament ===
Although designed with a pair of 68-pounder Lancaster muzzle-loading rifles, the Vigilant class were finished with one 7-inch (180 mm)/110-pound (50 kg) Armstrong breech-loading gun, one 68-pound (31 kg) Lancaster muzzle-loading rifled gun and two 20-pounder breech loaders.

== Ships ==
Name	Ship Builder	Launched	Fate
Coquette	R & H Green	25 October 1855	Broken up by White at Cowes in 1868
Wanderer	R & H Green	22 November 1855	Broken up by Castle at Charlton, arriving on 31 August 1866
Alacrity	C J Mare & Company	20 March 1856	Sold to Castle for breaking at Charlton on 7 October 1864
Vigilant	C J Mare & Company	20 March 1856	Ordered to be sold at Bombay on 25 February 1869
Lapwing	J. & R. White	26 January 1856	Sold to Marshall, Plymouth in 1864 and broken up in 1865
Ringdove	J. & R. White	22 February 1856	Sold on 2 June 1865 and broken up by White at Cowes in November 1866
Surprise	Money Wigram & Son	6 March 1856	Broken up by Marshall, Plymouth in November 1866
Renard	C J Mare & Company	24 April 1856	Broken up by Castle at Charlton in March 1866
Foxhound	C J Mare & Company	16 August 1856	Broken up by Castle at Charlton in August 1866
Mohawk	Young, Magnay & Company	11 January 1856	Sold to the Chinese Imperial Customs on 20 September 1862, renamed Peking and sailed in April 1863 (to join Sherard Osborn’s "Vampire Fleet"). Resold to the Egyptian Government on 30 December 1865
Sparrowhawk	Young, Magnay & Company	9 February 1856	Sold at Esquimault in 1872
Osprey	Fletcher & Fearnall	22 March 1856	Wrecked on the South East African coast near Klippen Point on 30 May 1867
Cormorant	Fletcher & Fearnall	19 May 1856	Sunk in action with the Taku forts in the Hai River, China, on 28 June 1859
Assurance	R & H Green	13 March 1856	Sold to Marshall, Plymouth on 8 March 1870
