= Billa Harrod =

English architectural conservationist

Billa Harrod OBE
- Born: Wilhelmine Margaret Eve Cresswell; 1 December 1911; New Hunstanton, Snettisham, Norfolk, England
- Died: 9 May 2005 (aged 93); Holt, Norfolk, England
- Occupations: Writer and architectural conservationist
- Known for: Saving the mediaeval churches of Norwich
- Spouse: Sir Roy Harrod
- Children: Dominick Harrod
- Relatives: Lieutenant-General Sir Peter Strickland (stepfather); Dame Barbara Strickland

Wilhelmine Margaret Eve, Lady Harrod OBE (née Cresswell, 1 December 1911 – 9 May 2005), known as Billa Harrod, was a British writer and architectural conservationist, best known for saving the mediaeval churches of Norwich, and the wife of the economist Sir Roy Harrod.

== Early life ==
She was born Wilhelmine Margaret Eve Cresswell on 1 December 1911 at New Hunstanton, Snettisham, Norfolk, the daughter of Lieutenant (later Captain) Francis Joseph Cresswell (died 1914) of the Norfolk Regiment and his wife, Barbara (née Ffolkes or ffolkes; 1884–1977). She was related to several Quaker gentry families, including the Gurneys.

Her father was killed in action at Mons not long after the beginning of the First World War, aged 31. Her mother remarried in 1918, Lieutenant-General Sir Peter Strickland (1869–1951). She had a sister, Eve Dorothy Kathleen, known as "Puffin" (later Mrs John Wiseman). The sisters grew up in Egypt, where their stepfather was the Commander-in-Chief of British forces.

== Career ==
From the 1930s, she lived between Norfolk and London, where she had a flat in Holborn with her sister Puffin and worked for the Georgian Group.

After marrying the economist Sir Roy Harrod in 1938, she moved to Oxford, where he was an academic, and where she became friends with John Betjeman (to whom she had been briefly engaged in the early 1930s) and his wife Penelope Chetwode, amongst others.

In 1957, Harrod and her co-writer Charles Linnel published the Shell Guide To Norfolk. As part of the process, she became aware of the poor condition of many of Norfolk's churches.

In 1970, 32 of Norwich's medieval churches were being considered for demolition, and with the help of Sir John Betjeman, she was able to save them, and then focused on rural churches in the county, becoming the founding chairman of the Norfolk Society Committee for Country Churches, which became the Norfolk Churches Trust, with Harrod as the founder, chairman and president.

She was appointed an Officer of the Order of the British Empire (OBE) in the 1992 Birthday Honours.

== Personal life ==
She married Sir Roy Harrod in 1938. One of their sons was Dominick Harrod, economics correspondent for the BBC. She was widowed in 1978.

== Later life ==
She died on 9 May 2005 at her home, the Old Rectory, Holt, Norfolk.
