= Richard Tryon =

English cricketer and British Army officer

Personal information
- Born: 31 August 1837; Bulwick, Northamptonshire, England
- Died: 12 December 1905 (aged 68); Marylebone, London, England
- Batting: Unknown

Domestic team information
- Years: Team
- 1871: Marylebone Cricket Club

Career statistics
Competition	First-class
Matches	1
Runs scored	7
Batting average	7.00
100s/50s	–/–
Top score	7
Catches/stumpings	1/–
- Source: Cricinfo, 12 August 2021

Richard Tryon DL JP (31 August 1837 — 12 December 1905) was an English first-class cricketer and British Army officer.

The son of Thomas Tryon and Anne Trollope, he was born in August 1837 at Bulwick Park in the Northamptonshire village of Bulwick. He was commissioned into the British Army as an ensign in the Rifle Brigade in November 1854. Shortly after he was promoted to lieutenant in February 1855. Tryon purchased the rank of captain in July 1858, later retiring from active service nearly a decade later in May 1867. Tryon made a single appearance in first-class cricket for the Marylebone Cricket Club (MCC), captained by W. G. Grace, against Kent at Lord's in 1871. Batting once in the match, he was dismissed by Bob Lipscomb for 7 runs in the MCC first innings.

A resident of The Lodge, Oakham in the County of Rutland, Tryon was nominated to be Sheriff of Rutland in November 1880. He was unsuccessful, with Francis Pierremont Cecil being made Sheriff; however, Cecil went on active naval service and was replaced by Tryon in April 1881. He was made a deputy lieutenant of Rutland in December 1901. He additionally served as a justice of the peace for Rutland.

He married Jane Anna Lucy Johnson, daughter of General William Augustus Johnson, in 1867. Two sons, Henry and Richard, were killed in the First World War. (Note: Alfred George Drake won the Victoria Cross for saving Henry Tryon in 1915) A brother was the Royal Navy Vice-Admiral Sir George Tryon. Tryon died at Marylebone in December 1905, following a short illness.
