= Peter Strickland (British Army officer) =

British Army general

Lieutenant-General Sir Peter Strickland KCB KBE CMG DSO
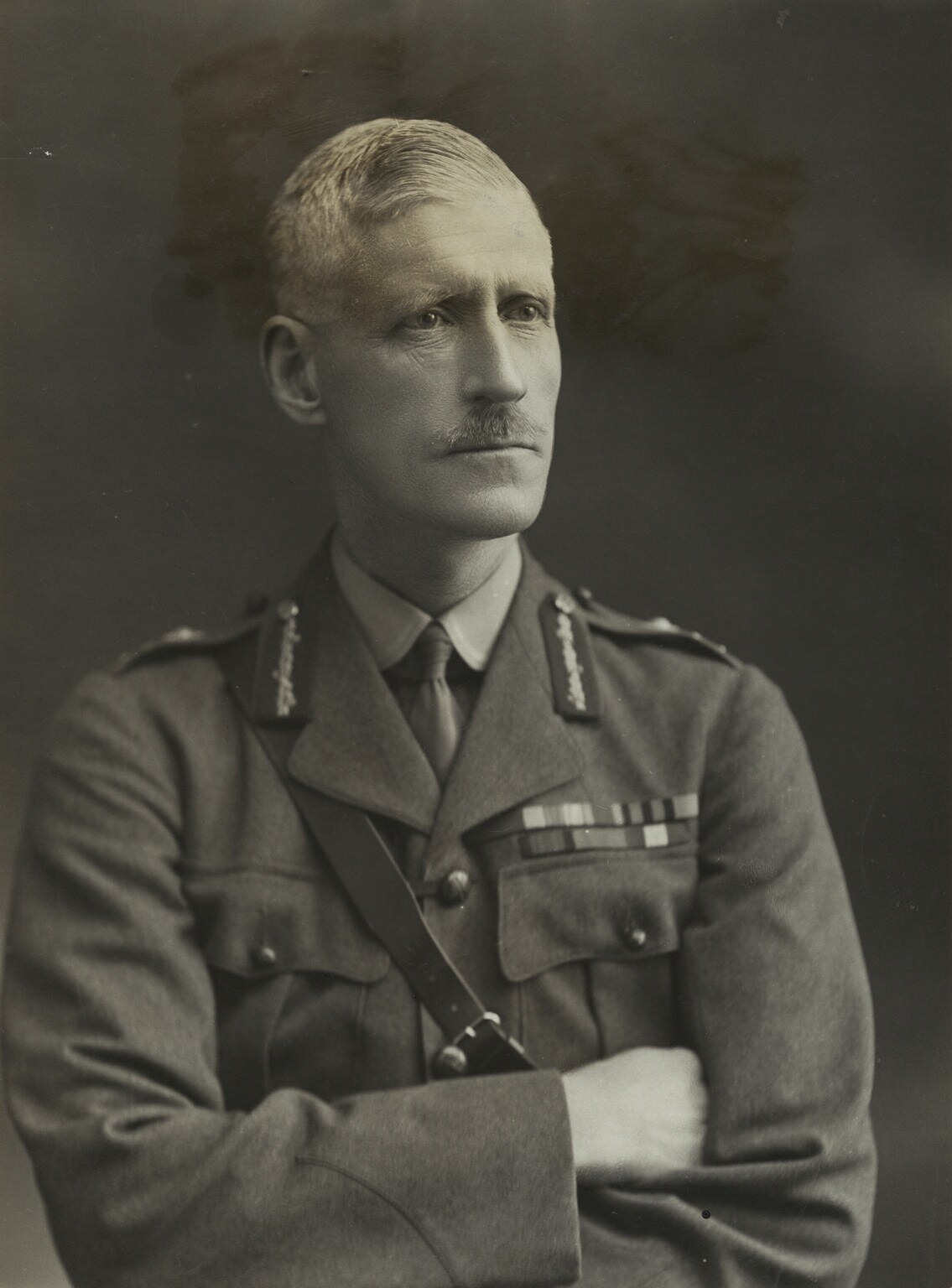
- Born: 3 August 1869; Snitterfield, Warwickshire
- Died: 24 June 1951 (aged 81); Snettisham, Norfolk
- Military career
- Allegiance: United Kingdom
- Branch: British Army
- Service years: 1888–1931
- Rank: Lieutenant-General
- Commands: British Troops in Egypt; 2nd Division; 6th Division; Western Division of the British Army of the Rhine; 1st Division; 98th Brigade; Jullundur Brigade; 1st Battalion Manchester Regiment; North Nigeria Regiment
- Conflicts: Mahdist War; First World War; Irish War of Independence
- Awards: Knight Commander of the Order of the Bath; Knight Commander of the Order of the British Empire; Companion of the Order of St Michael and St George; Distinguished Service Order

Lieutenant-General Sir Edward Peter Strickland, KCB, KBE, CMG, DSO (3 August 1869 – 24 June 1951) was a British Army officer who commanded the 1st Division during the First World War.

== Military career ==
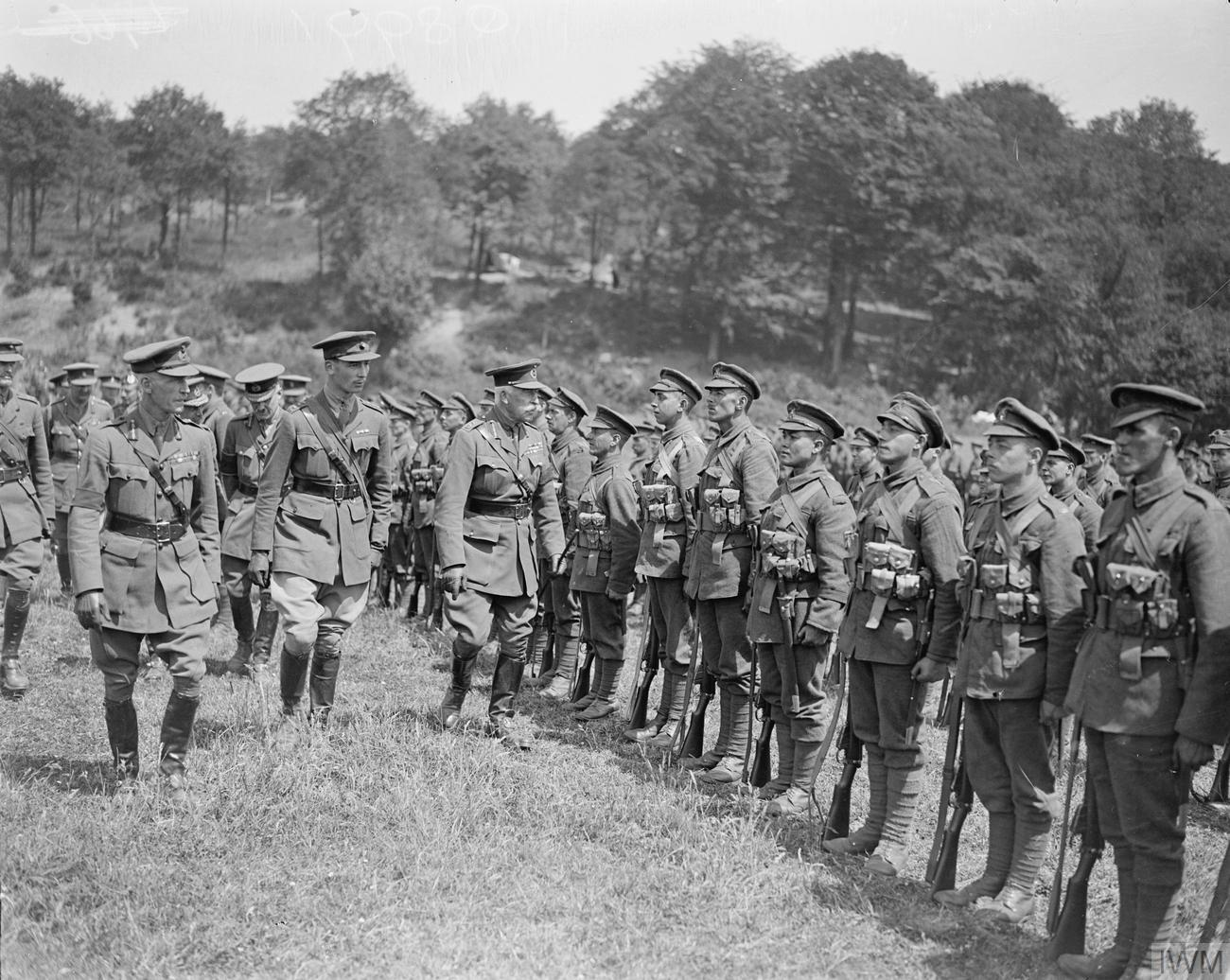
Prince Arthur, the Duke of Connaught, inspecting troops of the 2nd Battalion, King's Royal Rifle Corps, 2nd Infantry Brigade, 1st Division at Le Buissiere, near Bruay, France, 1 July 1918. Stood on the left of the screen is Major General Strickland, GOC 1st Division.

Educated at Warwick School, Strickland's military career began when he was commissioned as a lieutenant into the 7th (Militia) Battalion, King's Royal Rifle Corps (KRRC), in April 1887 before transferring to the Norfolk Regiment (later the Royal Norfolk Regiment) in November 1888. He served in Upper Burma in 1888/1889, on the Dongola expedition in 1896, and fought at the Battle of Atbara and the Battle of Omdurman in 1898. He was promoted to captain on 21 October 1899.

He served in North Nigeria from 1906 and was promoted to major on 1 September 1908. He commanded the North Nigeria Regiment in 1909.

On 1 June 1914 he was transferred to the Manchester Regiment as a lieutenant colonel and became commanding officer (CO) of the 1st Battalion, Manchester Regiment.

He served in the First World War, leading the battalion in action on the Western Front. He was promoted in January 1915 to the temporary rank of brigadier general, and took command of the Jullundur Brigade, leading it at the Battle of Neuve Chapelle and at the Second Battle of Ypres. He was promoted in February to brevet colonel and continued his war service as general officer commanding (GOC) of the 98th Infantry Brigade from late 1915. After being promoted to temporary major general in June 1916, he succeeded Major General Arthur Holland as GOC of the 1st Division of the British Expeditionary Force (BEF). He would remain as its GOC until the end of the war, leading it at the Battle of the Somme in 1916 and the Battle of Lys two years later. In December 1917 he was appointed as colonel of the Norfolk Regiment. In January 1918 his rank of major general became substantive.

After the war Strickland's division was redesignated as the Western Division of the British Army of the Rhine and he served with his division in the Allied occupation of the Rhineland.

In November 1919 he was made GOC of the 6th Division in Ireland, in which role he survived an assassination attempt by the Irish Republican Army in Cork in September 1920 before assuming the additional responsibilities of military governor (under Martial law) for the counties of Munster, Kilkenny and Wexford in January 1921. He was appointed GOC 2nd Division in 1923 and GOC British Troops in Egypt in 1927 before being promoted to full general in May 1931 and retiring from the army on 14 November 1931.

From 1917 to 1946 Strickland was the colonel of the Norfolk Regiment, which became the Royal Norfolk Regiment in 1935.

== Family ==
In 1918, Strickland married Barbara Cresswell (née Ffolkes); they had a daughter, and there were two daughters from his wife's previous marriage, including Billa Harrod. Barbara, Lady Strickland, was appointed a Dame Commander of the Order of the British Empire (DBE) in 1923.

== Honours ==
- Distinguished Service Order – 1899
- Companion of the Order of St Michael and St George – 1913
- Knight Commander of the Order of the Bath – 1919 (Companion (CB) 1917)
- Knight Commander of the Order of the British Empire – 1923
- Third class, Order of Medjidie – 1902 – in recognition of valuable services rendered to Hs Highness the Khedive of Egypt

Military offices
| Preceded by Arthur Holland | GOC 1st Division; 1916–1919 | Succeeded by Guy Bainbridge |
| Preceded by Thomas Marden | GOC 6th Division; 1919–1922 | Division disbanded |
| Preceded by Richard Butler | GOC 2nd Division; 1923–1926 | Succeeded by Edmund Ironside |
| Preceded by Sir Richard Haking | GOC British Troops in Egypt; 1927–1931 | Succeeded by Sir John Burnett-Stuart |
