= George Tryon =

British admiral (1832–1893)

Vice-Admiral Sir George Tryon KCB
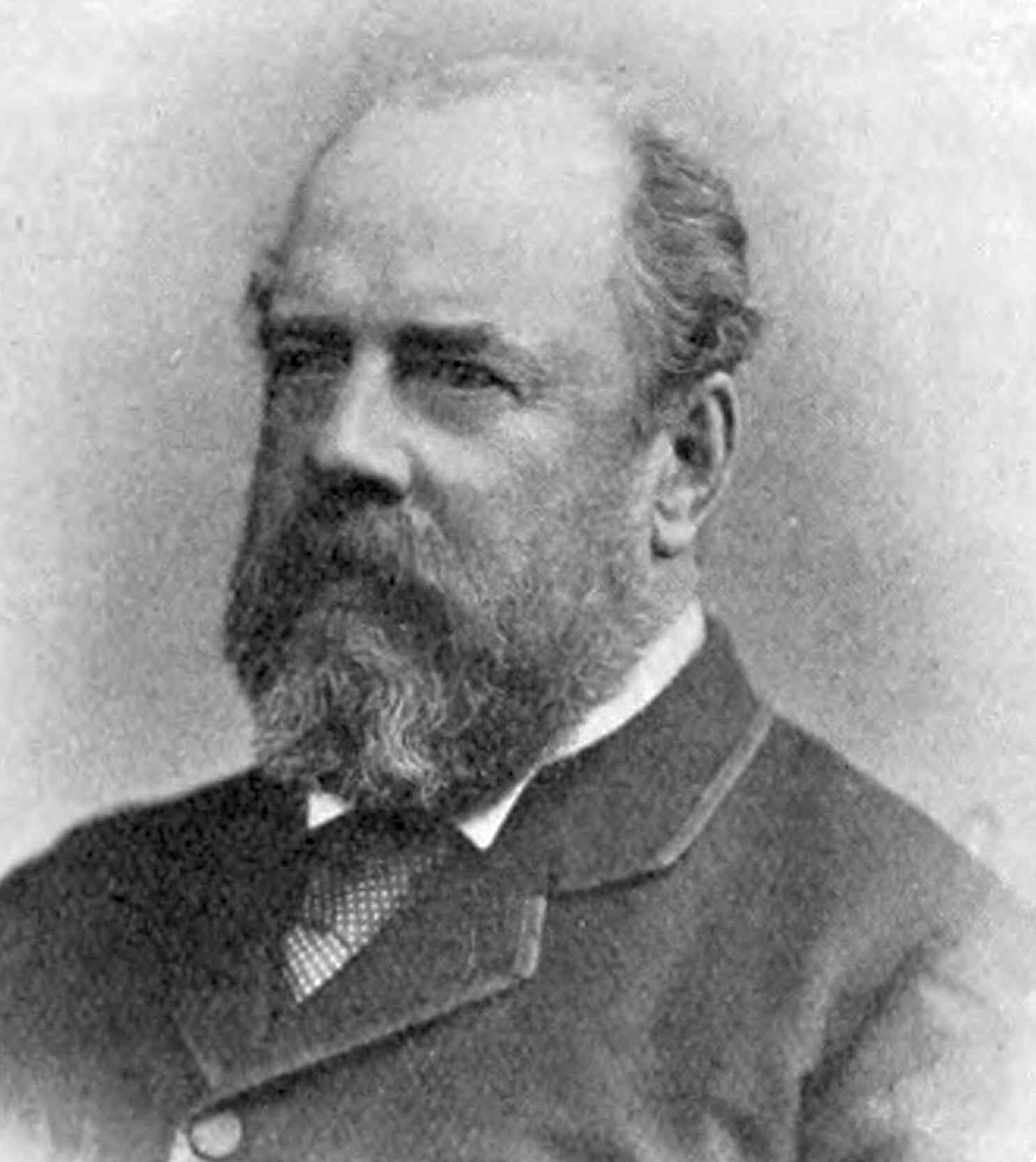
- Sir George Tryon
- Born: 4 January 1832; Bulwick Park, Northamptonshire
- Died: 22 June 1893 (aged 61); Mediterranean Sea off Tripoli
- Relatives: George Tryon, 1st Baron Tryon (son)
- Military career
- Allegiance: United Kingdom
- Branch: Royal Navy
- Service years: 1848–1893
- Rank: Vice Admiral
- Commands: Mediterranean Fleet (1891–93); Admiral-Superintendent, Naval Reserves (1888–91); Australia Station (1884–87); HMS Monarch (1878–82); HMS Raleigh (1874–77); HMS Surprise (1864–66)
- Conflicts: Crimean War
- Awards: Knight Commander of the Order of the Bath

Vice-Admiral Sir George Tryon, KCB (4 January 1832 – 22 June 1893) was a Royal Navy officer who died when his flagship HMS Victoria collided with HMS Camperdown during manoeuvres off Tripoli, Lebanon.

== Early life ==
Tryon was born at Bulwick Park, Northamptonshire, England, the third son of Thomas Tryon and his wife Anne Trollope. He had three brothers: the eldest, Thomas, joined the 7th Royal Fusiliers, fought at Alma and Inkerman and served through the Indian Mutiny. The second, Henry, passed through Sandhurst before joining the Rifle Brigade, fighting at Alma, Inkerman and Balaclava before being killed in an attack on Russian positions in 1854. George was the third son: the fourth, Richard, also served in the Rifle Brigade. George attended a preparatory school and then Eton College before becoming a naval cadet in 1848, two years older than usual, aged sixteen. The choice of a naval career was made by George himself, rather than his family. Other students reported him to be a quick learner with a wide breadth of knowledge, whether because of his natural ability or his longer period of education before joining the Navy. George was described as 'a tall lanky lad nearly six feet high, full of spirits and fond of a lark'.

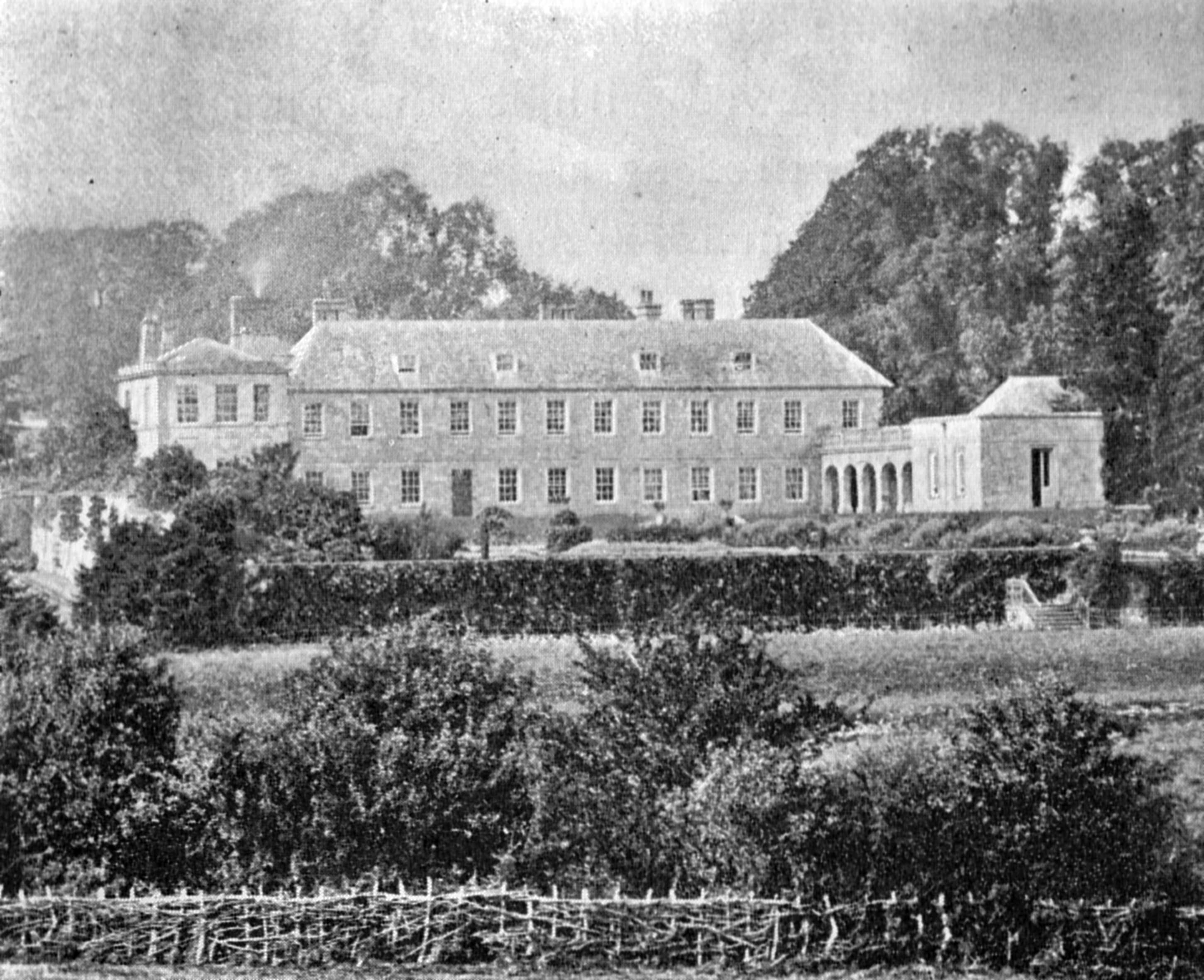
Bulwick Park, Northamptonshire, the Tryon family home

Naval training at this time took place on board ship, and having obtained a nomination and passing the modest exams, he was posted to HMS Wellesley in spring 1848. Wellesley (Captain George Goldsmith under Admiral the Earl of Dundonald) was then at Plymouth preparing to leave as flagship of the North American Station. She was a two-decker sailing ship, since steam power was only then being introduced into the navy. At that time, the principal important art to be taught to new recruits was how to handle a sailing ship, though within ten years almost all first class naval ships would be steam powered. He was required to pay his own schoolmaster at the rate of £5 per year. In particular, his mathematics at the start of his training was considered very poor, but at examinations eighteen months later, he came top of the class. Wellesley sailed on 24 March, arriving at Bermuda on 3 May. In correspondence home, he observed that he was seasick, and that the gales caused considerable broken crockery aboard ship. Yet while the gunroom (where the midshipman lived) suffered badly from its broken cups of a different pattern to those used elsewhere on the ship, their hens, much alike with others on board, never became ill or died.

As a midshipman, Tryon was not an official member of the crew, but a supernumerary, available as spare crew for posting to other ships. He narrowly avoided a posting to Imaum, a hulk lying in Port Royal harbour which needed crew, which would have been a very unpromising start to his career. Although officially posted to that ship, he prevailed upon Lieutenant Cochran (son of Lord Dundonald) to arrange that he would remain on loan to Wellesley. Tryon started to make sketches of the places he visited, which while not very good at the start, improved steadily. In November the ship reached Halifax, where George noted, 'the other day another of our men was murdered here'. Although Wellesley was a sailing ship, it was accompanied by a paddle-wheel steamer: when the wind failed the steamer would tow the sail ship, when the wind blew well the steamer would be towed to save coal.

In the summer of 1849, Tryon had the chance of joining a tour of the United States, but declined in favour of study, and to allow him command of a cutter, which was unusual for a junior cadet. In the summer of 1850, he took the tour, visiting Boston, New York, Washington, where they visited the House of Representatives, were introduced to senior politicians and witnessed a debate over California's requested admission to the Union as a free rather than slave state. He commented on the great welcome given to them once it became known that they were English. He also commented on the absence of beggars in the streets.

== Mediterranean fleet ==
Wellesley returned to Chatham in June 1851. After leave, Tryon was posted to HMS Vengeance, captained by Lord Edward Russell. Vengeance sailed for the Mediterranean in August 1851. The ship was second fastest of the battleships and frigates (after Phaeton), lending considerable prestige to her crew at a time when sailing ability and speed were still considered all important. Admiral William Robert Mends later said of Tryon, 'He served with me, when I was commander of the Vengeance, for two years as a midshipman, and a better young officer never existed; ever full of energy and zeal. As a boat midshipman and signal midshipman he was unrivalled.' The ship stopped at Alexandria, and Tryon was given ten days leave to visit Cairo, where the party were received as guests of the Pasha. The party were obliged to stay on as guests, missing the sailing of their ship. The consul advised Captain Russell who then joined the party, which had now transformed into a diplomatic mission promoting British plans for a railway from Alexandria to Cairo. Tryon wrote home, explaining the British desire to create a land route to India, and the continuous vying for power in the region between Britain and France. On a trip to Gibraltar, Tryon and others from the ship joined the local foxhunt in a group of around forty (some in red), riding across the rugged and precipitous terrain on local ponies. Vengeance returned to England in 1852, reaching Spithead on Christmas Day.

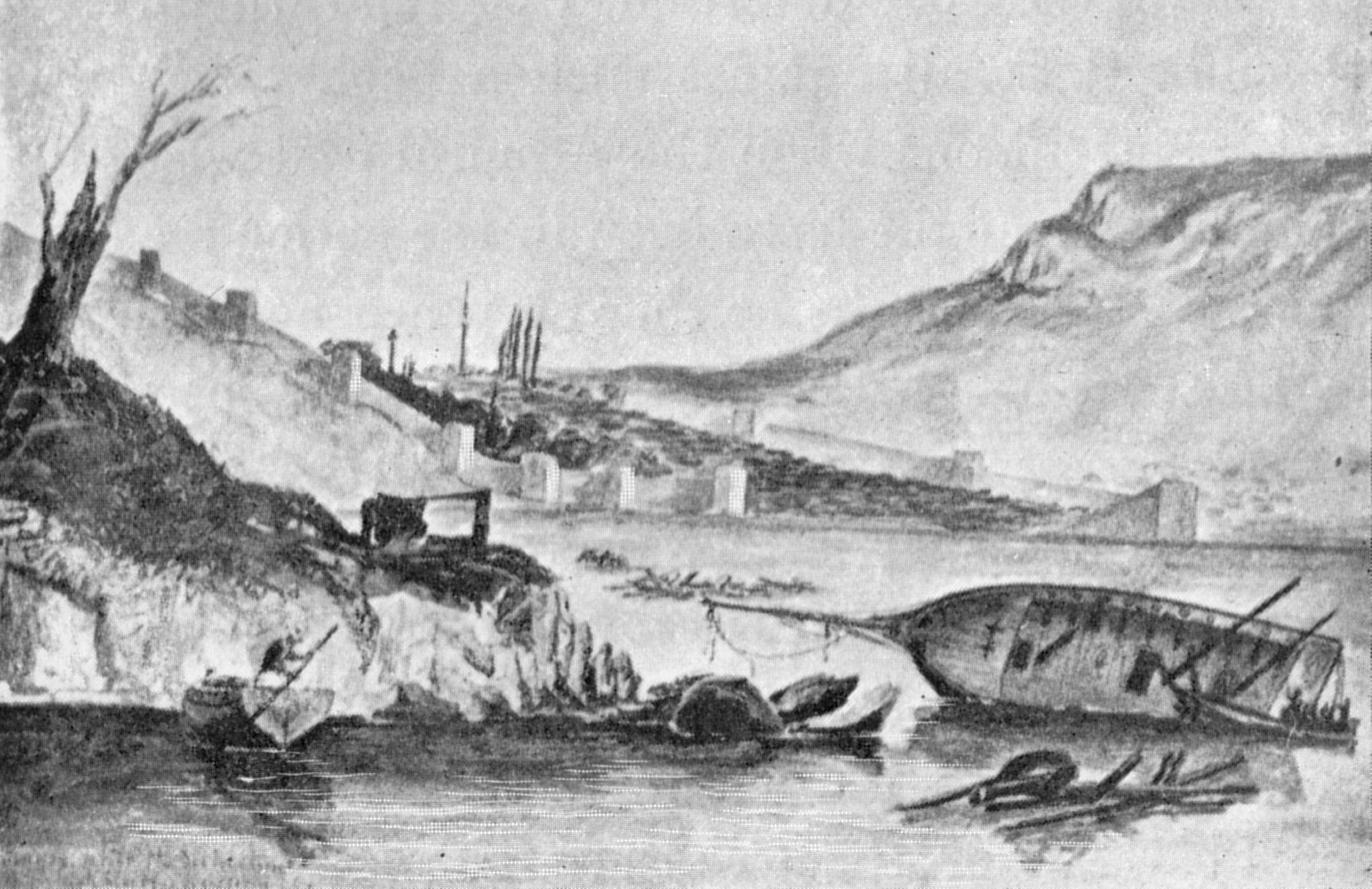
Drawing by Tryon of Sinop Bay after the battle

On 10 April 1853 she sailed again for the Mediterranean, arriving at Malta early June to join the Mediterranean fleet under vice-admiral James Dundas. The ship had a new commander, George Le Geyt Bowyear, who reported that Tryon was now signal officer. Considerable competition existed between Vengeance and the fleet flagship in manoeuvres, where Vengeance frequently performed best. Part of Tryon's duties included keeping watch on the flagship before exercises, including going out in a boat at night to see what preparations were being made for the following day. The fleet took station in Bashika Bay outside the Dardanelles between June and October, because of the increasing tension with Russia before the Crimean War. In October the fleet moved through the Dardanelles to the Bosphorus and moored at Beikos Bay. On 30 November, the Russian fleet destroyed a squadron of Turkish ships at Sinop, just after Turkey declared war. Britain was not yet at war with Russia, but Vengeance visited Sinop January 1854 and saw the remains of the ships, which had been caught at anchor by the Russians. The British fleet moved into the Black Sea to land troops at Varna and took part in the bombardment of Odessa on 22 April. Cholera broke out through the fleet in August and eighteen died on board Vengeance. The effect varied from ship to ship, with few officers affected: 140 out of 950 died on board the flagship HMS Britannia The ship assisted with the transportation of the army across the Black Sea to the Crimea before attending at the Battle of Alma on 20 September. Tryon as signal midshipman was stationed at the main top and so had a good view of the battle in which two of his brothers were taking part.

Vengeance was once again offshore anchored in Kasatch Bay with Tryon as signals officer watching events during the Battle of Inkerman. After the battle he joined the Naval Brigade in the trenches and was wounded. Captain Stephen Lushington, commanding the Naval Brigade, described him as 'a very promising officer.' Tryon arranged the construction of a hut for himself and two other officers from Vengeance, which uniquely boasted glass windows scrounged from the navy.

Tryon passed his seamanship examination on 17 March 1854, at which time he was already acting mate. Having started late, he was anxious to obtain promotion as speedily as possible. Promotion above the rank of captain was on the basis of seniority, so it was important to obtain rapid promotion in the lower ranks. He spent only eight months as mate, then six years as Lieutenant and five and a half years as commander, which was one of the fastest rates of promotion at the time. On 21 October Lieutenant Greathead of Britannia was killed, and in November Tryon was promoted to his position, thereby transferring to Britannia. However, he remained ashore as part of the Naval Brigade.

In January 1855 Britannia's shore party, together with those from other ships which had been serving together ashore, were all embarked on Vengeance to return to England. Britannia had already departed for England with Admiral Dundas, who had now been replaced as Commander in Chief of the Black Sea fleet by Admiral Sir Edmund Lyons. Tryon took and passed examinations at the Royal naval college Portsmouth and HMS Excellent before returning to a ship. Commander Mends from the Vengeance had now become flag-captain to Admiral Lyons and requested Tryon be appointed to his ship. HMS Royal Albert was a three-decker, steam-powered and brand new. Tryon returned to the Black Sea in June. Tryon now acted as aide-de-camp to the admiral, travelling ashore to report progress in the siege of Sebastopol and later describing the plundering of the town by the victorious armies. He was present at the fall of Kinburn on 17 October 1855, where he was placed in charge of fire-fighting parties. On account of being on duty, he regretfully was unable to liberate any souvenirs for himself. In his letters home he commented on repeated failures by the British and their allies to follow up successes, instead allowing the Russians time to withdraw and regroup.

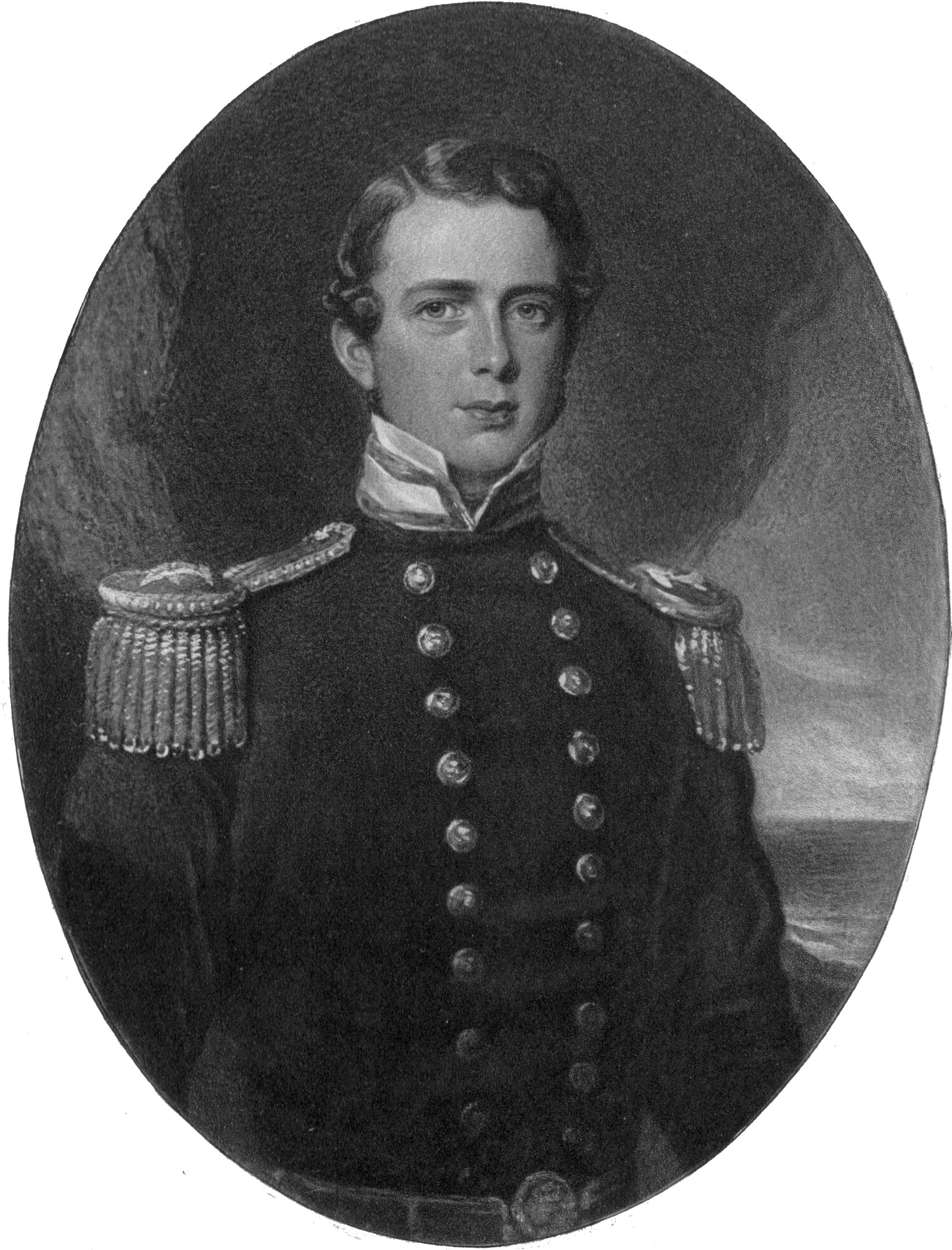
Tryon in 1857, from a miniature by Easton

In December 1855 Lyons went to Marseille to attend the peace conference for the Crimea, leaving his ship to sail to Malta. While in the Aegean Sea the gland surrounding the propeller shaft failed, allowing water to flood into the ship. The bilge pumps could not cope with the flow, but the ship was kept afloat by connecting the cooling water pumps used to condense steam in the engine to the bilge instead of open sea. After use the water was pumped overboard and provided the engine remained running the ship could be kept clear of water. The ship was near the island of Zea, so Captain Mends circled the island through the night until with daylight he was able to beach the ship on a sandy bay. The engines then had to be kept working for four days while a dam was built around the ship to keep out the water and allow repairs to be made. Mends chose Tryon to go to Piraeus to summon help rather than a more senior officer because of his 'marked intelligence'.

The remainder of Tryon's time on Royal Albert was largely uneventful. In November 1857 he had an attack of rheumatic fever, requiring him to spend time in hospital in Malta, before being granted leave in Italy to recover. He visited Naples, Rome, Florence and Pompeii, where the volcano was unusually active. When the ship went to Gibraltar he visited Cadiz and Seville. His considerations turned to his career, which risked faltering because he was older than other officers and lacked a patron. However, his good reports meant that his name was submitted to Queen Victoria for consideration for appointment to the royal yacht HMY Victoria and Albert. This carried with it automatic promotion to commander after two years' service. Royal Albert returned to England, where in July 1858 she acted as part of the escort for Queen Victoria's visit to Cherbourg to meet the Emperor and Empress of France. The queen's yacht entered and departed the harbour between lines of British warships stationed at the approach. Ashore, Tryon came within ten yards of the royal party: the event was celebrated with much firing of guns in salute, fireworks and the lighting up of the ships by lights spread through the rigging and shown at all portholes. Tryon commented that some of the noisiest and most eccentrically dressed attendees were those on the steamer bringing members of the House of Commons.

Royal Albert paid off on 24 August 1858 and on 4 November he joined Victoria and Albert. Each year one of the two lieutenants on board would be promoted and replaced. For nine months of the year the yacht had little to do and her officers lived on board the Royal George hulk in Portsmouth harbour. At the end of his two years he duly received promotion, leaving with a commendation from Captain Joseph Denman, 'as an officer of great zeal and promise. His ready resource, active intelligence, sound judgement and good temper, especially qualify him for success in his profession; and I consider it my duty to recommend him strongly to their Lordships as an officer likely to perform any service required of him with ability.'

== Commander (1860–1866) ==
Tryon was placed on half pay after promotion to commander in October 1860. In June 1861 he was selected to become second in command of HMS Warrior, the world's first ocean-going iron-hulled armoured battleship. Warrior was still under construction, so temporarily he was appointed to Fisguard. Warrior's sister ship Black Prince was a year later in entering service, but in November 1862 the two ships carried out speed trials, where Warrior was deemed to be the faster. Although the ships' armour was considered impregnable at the time they were constructed, they immediately instigated an arms race between armour and gun designers which continued up to World War II, where each successive ship had to have more of each to remain ahead. This meant that despite her initial claim to invulnerability, she rapidly became obsolete.

In March 1863 Warrior acted as escort for Princess Alexandra of Denmark, who came to Britain to marry the Prince of Wales (the future Edward VII). Alexandra was much impressed by the station-keeping of the much larger warship, so much so that her signal to the ship, 'Princess is much pleased,' was inscribed into the ship's wheel. In the autumn the Channel fleet toured ports around the coast of Britain where Warrior was much admired.

In July 1864 Tryon was appointed to command HMS Surprise, a 680-ton screw- and sail-propelled gunboat in the Mediterranean. Tryon was given the task of rescuing the British barque Energy, which had run aground on the coast of Sicily seven miles from Pozzallo, and had been abandoned. In two days the ship was refloated and taken back to Malta. Admiral Sir Robert Smart, Commander in Chief of the Mediterranean, recommended Tryon and his crew should receive salvage for the ship, and the sum of £595 was granted to be divided between them. Once again Tryon received a commendation in the Admiral's report. During this time he wrote a report on punishments within the navy, which was forwarded by his commander to the Admiralty. He recommended that fines to sailors absent from duty or incapable should be limited to forfeiting pay for the time they failed to carry out their duties, and this was adopted.

In February 1866 Surprise was visiting the Greek island of Santorini, which is part of the rim of a volcano. The ship witnessed clouds of steam and explosions as a new island 100 yards long and 50 wide had just begun to appear from the seabed a few days earlier. The eruption completely filled a channel through Santorini and then began to encroach on houses on the land. Surprise visited a number of ports around the Mediterranean, reporting on their facilities for the Admiralty.

An issue arose as to whether the Admiralty should retain control of warehouses at Gibraltar, which were then underused. Tryon reported that in the event of war, stores immediately available at Gibraltar might be vitally important to the fleet, and that at such a time it would be virtually impossible to get back storage space relinquished in peace time. He was one of the few at that time to recognise the port's strategic significance for the fleet.

Surprise returned to England to pay off at Plymouth Sound in April 1866. On arrival, Tryon found waiting his promotion to post-captain on 11 April 1866, which he had achieved by the comparatively early age of 34.

== Captain (1866–1884) ==
Tryon now spent eighteen months away from ships. Aside from time on half pay on leave, he attended the Royal Naval College at Portsmouth to study steam technology. In August 1867 while touring Norway on a fishing expedition, he received a recall and appointment as 'additional captain' to HMS Octavia. Octavia was the flagship of the East India Station commanded by Commodore Leopold Heath. Tryon was attached to Octavia, but his duties were to act as transport officer at Annesley Bay, which was to be used as a staging post for troops and supplies for Sir Robert Napier's expedition to Magdala in Abyssinia. Tryon arrived in Bombay on 10 October 1867 where preparations were already underway. 291 transport ships were chartered, mainly from Bombay but some coming from England via the Cape of Good Hope. The advance party went to Zoulla in Annesley Bay in November, described as one of the hottest places on earth. The expedition delivered a fighting force of 4,000 men to Magdala out of total 13,000 soldiers and 60,000 people involved all together. 36,000 animals, mainly for transport, had to be taken to Zoulla. There was no drinking water, so 30,000 tons had to be distilled by the ships' steam engines using 8,000 tons of coal in the process, with ships held at anchor with their engines running. Tryon's duties involved early morning meetings ashore with military authorities, days spent unloading and organising ships, and evenings spent in preparation for the next. Tryon was commended for his organisational skills and tact in dealing with all the disparate parties and complaining ships' captains. Approximately half his staff was invalided out because of the heat during the six months' stay, with the rest all suffering. When he left he was presented with a scroll recording the appreciation of his efforts by the captains of the transport fleet, and later in England was presented with a specially commissioned dinner service decorated with scenes commemorating the campaign. He was awarded the CB for his services in Abyssinia.

Although he continued working as hard as ever throughout the campaign, Tryon's health suffered. He injured his leg while fighting a fire on board one of the ships, and on returning to England, at first could not walk a modest distance without resting. In April 1869 he married Clementina Heathcote, and had time away from the navy for the next two years. Clementina was the daughter of Gilbert Heathcote (later Baron Aveland) who was a neighbour of the Tryon's and had been a friend since childhood. Their honeymoon was spent at Bulby Hall, home of Clementina's brother, the Earl of Ancaster. They then travelled in Europe for three months before renting Tickhill Castle near Doncaster.

In April 1871, Tryon was appointed private secretary to the First Lord of the Admiralty, George Goschen. The appointment normally went to an experienced captain with ten years' service, whereas Tryon had yet to serve at sea in that rank. The post carried considerable influence, equivalent in practice to that of other Lords of the Admiralty, in advising upon naval appointments. Goschen said of Tryon, "I had an immensely high opinion not only of his naval knowledge, but of his general savoir faire, rapidity of judgement, decision, extraordinary shrewdness, and great knowledge of men. He was somewhat cynical in his views of human nature but his cynicism was of a good humoured and harmless cast." A story was related of the Admiralty board travelling to Dover to meet the Shah of Persia in 1872. At the railway station it was found they would have to walk some distance through a large crowd. Tryon commented to a friend that he would get one of the admirals to carry his bag for him, which he duly did by asking the admiral to hold his bag while he opened a way through the crowd. Tryon then avoided reclaiming his luggage until they reached their destination.

=== HMS Raleigh ===
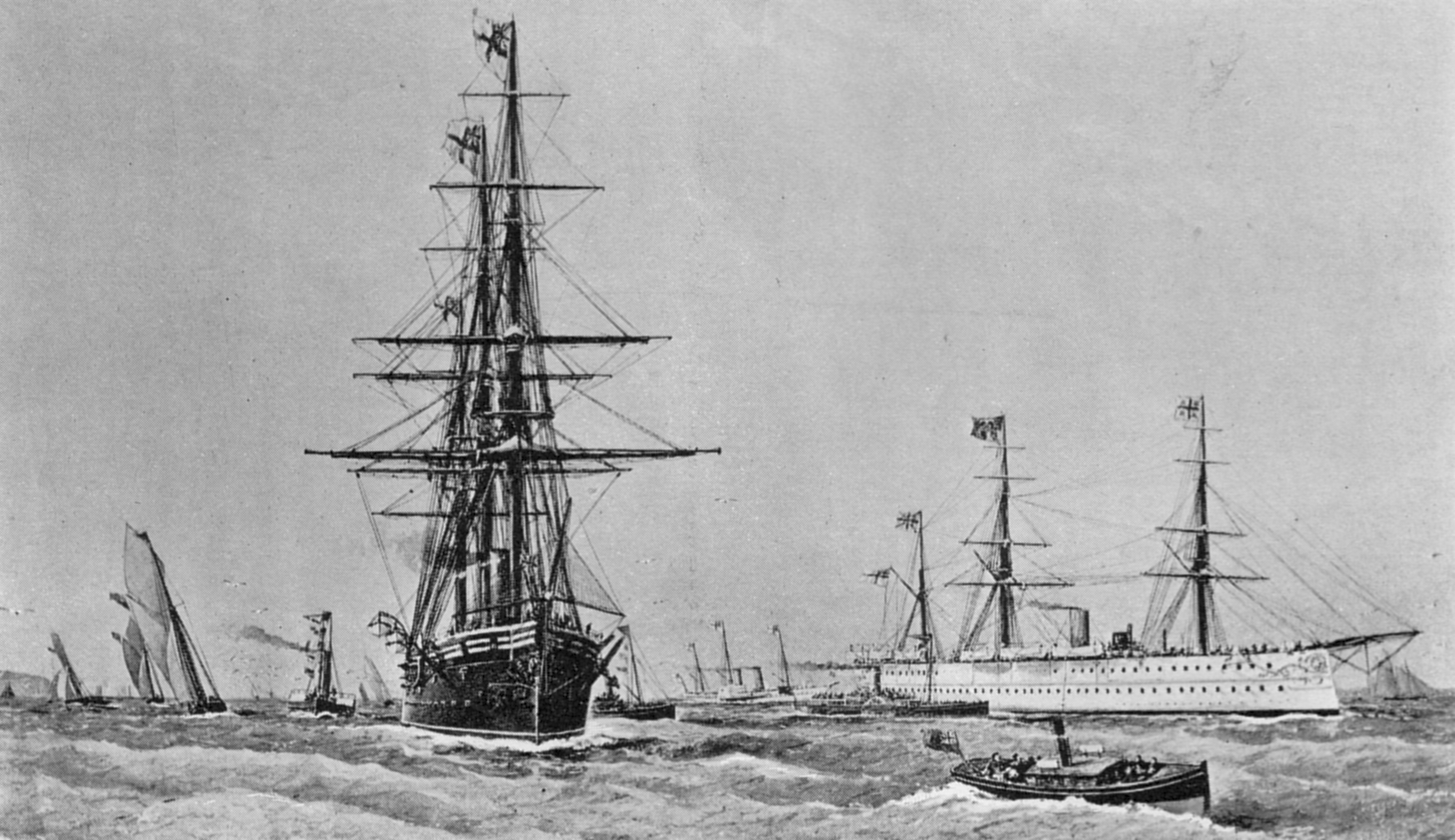
HMS Raleigh and HMS Serapis

Tryon left the Admiralty to take up command of HMS Raleigh, a new ship under construction. He was attached to the depot ship HMS Pembroke about a month before, until Raleigh was commissioned on 13 January 1874. Tryon took the opportunity to suggest improvements to her final fitting out. After a cruise of Ireland she was attached to the 'Flying Squadron' commanded by Rear Admiral Sir George Granville Randolph. Raleigh proved to be the fastest of the six ships under steam, but still also the second fastest under sail alone, after Immortalite. The squadron set out on a tour to Gibraltar, then South America where, at the Falkland Islands, officers from the ships hired a schooner to tour around and organised hunting parties across the island. Next they went to South Africa, arriving at the Cape of Good Hope on 6 March 1875. There Raleigh took on board Sir Garnet Wolesley and his staff to transport them to Natal. The remainder of the squadron returned to the Mediterranean, where Raleigh joined them later. At Gibraltar, Randolph was replaced by Rear Admiral Rowley Lambert, and the whole squadron was ordered to go to Bombay, to attend the Prince of Wales who would shortly be making a tour of India.

Tryon showed concern for the wellbeing of his men and the better ordering of the Navy. Before Raleigh had left England, thirty men had deserted from the ship, and more took the opportunity to escape from ships of the squadron at Montevideo. Tryon wrote a memo to the Admiralty recommending that the penalties for desertion should be reduced, suggesting that a number of those deserting were of little use to the navy and should be let go, while others who were good seamen, but who had some urgent personal reason for absconding, were afraid to return later because of the severe penalties. He also instituted a programme of weighing his men and ensuring they got enough food, noting that if, as frequently happened on board ship, the men weighed less by the end of a tour than at the start, then likely their strength and fitness was reduced too. He instituted a 'dry canteen' on board to try to improve their diet.

Travelling to the cape, a man fell overboard in high seas. Tryon had to make the difficult decision whether to try to rescue him, because any small boat risked sinking, taking her crew down also. However, the man was seen to be swimming strongly, so the ship was halted and a boat launched to rescue him. The boat got away well, though was sucked back under the stern of the ship before breaking free. The ship then had to manoeuvre under sail, tacking as best she could to follow the boat while keeping it on the safe side for recovery. All went well, and Tryon received congratulations from the other captains for his skill in carrying out the rescue.

The squadron arrived in Bombay shortly before the Prince, who was travelling on HMS Serapis and HMY Osborne, and a number of grand events took place. On one evening a dinner was arranged for the Prince in the Caves of Elephanta, on an island near Bombay. The ships were arranged around the approach with illuminations and fireworks brought from England. As the Prince's ship approached, rockets were set off, one or two hundred at a time. One of Raleigh's sails caught fire, but preparations had been made in anticipation that something would catch fire in the rigging, and it was soon put out. As Raleigh was the only ship fast enough to keep up with Serapis and Osborne, Tryon then accompanied the royal progress to Goa, Bepore, and Colombo, where the party disembarked for a tour of Ceylon. Raleigh was required to accommodate all the newspaper correspondents who wished to accompany the Prince. The royal party rejoined at Madras to travel to Calcutta, where Raleigh had to leave the party, being too big to navigate the Hooghly. Raleigh rejoined once more at Bombay for the return trip to England via the Suez canal, setting out on 13 March 1876. Now she was required to accommodate gifts given to the Prince, including two tigers, a leopard, a number of birds and smaller animals, which occupied the space previously taken by the journalists. The remainder of the Flying Squadron left for China. The royal party arrived at Portsmouth on 11 May and were met at The Needles by the Princess of Wales. The whole party proceeded through the Solent with an elephant standing on each of the paddleboxes on Osborne.

Raleigh was refitted and sent to join the Mediterranean squadron, where tension was once again rising with Turkey and Russia. In autumn 1876 Tryon was at Bashika Bay, where he had been twenty-two years before. He noted the improved health of the sailors this time, which he ascribed to the fact that fresh water was now produced on board ship rather than having to be brought aboard. The political tension came to nothing, and the tour was highlighted by escort duty to the Duchess of Edinburgh aboard the Russian Imperial yacht, hunting trips and visits to places of interest. In June 1877 Tryon was replaced by Captain Jago as commander of Raleigh after a tour of three and a half years and returned home.

=== Committee to revise the Signal Book ===
From June 1877 to October 1878, Tryon remained in England. In January 1878 he was appointed to a committee set up to revise the general signal book. President of the committee was Rear Admiral Hope, other members were Captain Philip Colomb, Captain Walter Kerr, Commanders Bruce and Romilly. Colomb and Tryon represented divergent views on signalling, but all members of the committee were experts in the field while Kerr and Hope held the balance.

=== HMS Monarch 1878 ===
On 1 October 1878, Tryon was appointed to HMS Monarch of the Mediterranean fleet under Admiral Geoffrey Hornby, joining her at Artaki in the Sea of Marmora on 18 November. The British were concerned to protect the Bulair peninsula from Russian advances and had stationed ships at Gallipoli and in the Gulf of Xeros so as to have artillery commanding possible approaches. The main part of the British fleet stayed in the eastern part of the Sea of Marmora during the crisis.

Tryon was required to sit on the court of enquiry into the explosion of a 12-inch (305 mm) gun on board HMS Thunderer. On 2 January 1879 while carrying out target practice in the Gulf of Ismid, one of the guns burst, killing seven men and injuring thirty-six. This was of considerable concern since similar guns were used by many ships. It was eventually concluded that the muzzle-loading gun had been double loaded, which produced exactly the same result when tested on another gun.

In the summer of 1879 Monarch cruised the Levant, visiting various places where Tryon would land, both for pleasure but also seeking useful information. Britain had just acquired Cyprus, which it was intended to develop into a base for 10,000 troops and a resort, but of which Tryon was skeptical because of its poor climate and lack of a good harbour. In his travels he discovered deposits of coal at Ayas in the Gulf of Scanderoon, and was responsible for organising the transport of marble statues from Aleppo for the British Museum. In March 1880 Hornby was replaced as commander of the fleet by Admiral Sir Beauchamp Seymour, who in the summer sent Monarch and Thunderer to attend the launching of the battleship Italia by the King of Italy at Naples. Tryon was commended by the king for his handling of the British ships.

In May 1881 Tryon was sent as senior officer with a group of ships to patrol the coast of Tunisia. Although there was no war, France was concerned about events in Tunisia, and the French gunboat Leopold searched two British schooners looking for gunpowder. This was a breach of international law and might have escalated into a serious incident, but Tryon handled the matter with tact. He suggested to the senior French officer, Captain Rieunnier, that perhaps a mistake had been made. The French apologised and explained that the commander of Leopold had misunderstood his instructions.

A more serious incident took place when the region of Sfax in Tunisia rose in revolt against French intervention. The revolt was started by a local artillery commander, who was called upon to produce his troops in support of the French, but in fact despite receiving pay for the men, had none. To divert attention, he organised a local demonstration against the French. This led to other foreign nationals fleeing the region, although it was only the French who were affected. Local Bedawin then took up the revolt which grew out of control, although order and respect for foreign property in the town was maintained by a local leader, Camoum. The French sent ships and then a fleet to bombard the town, and eventually troops which landed to occupy it on 16 July. After order was restored, the French set up a commission of enquiry to investigate claims for damages and invited the British and Italians each to appoint a representative. Tryon was chosen to represent the British on the commission which first met 29 August. The Commission sat for six weeks, by which time the evidence submitted already indicated strongly that damage to property and looting had been carried out by the French troops, at which point the commission was suddenly dissolved. The British official position was one of neutrality, and in effect allowing the French to do what they wanted. This placed Tryon in a delicate position that while he confirmed the views of locals that the French had caused much of the problems and intended to take control of the region, Britain would do nothing to intervene. He was instructed to send reports directly to the Admiralty and foreign office, rather than to his commander, Admiral Seymour. Monarch spent much of a six-month period at anchor off Tunisia in temperatures of 80–90 degrees Fahrenheit, without any leave being permitted, which made the task an uncomfortable one for all concerned. Although the warship was not required, the Foreign office specifically requested that Tryon should remain for as long as possible. Tryon was commended for his handling of the affair by Earl Granville from the foreign office, the Lords of the Admiralty, and by the French Government.

Monarch was paid off at Malta in January 1882, and the crew returned to England on board Tamar.

=== Permanent Secretary to the Admiralty (1882) ===
Tryon had four months leave before being appointed Permanent Secretary to the Admiralty. This post, in charge of a civilian staff, was sometimes given to serving officers and sometimes civilians. Tryon demonstrated great powers of persuasion and an ability to get his way in an argument without offending. His appointment was initially temporary, following the sudden death of the previous appointee, but he proved a great success. One of his most significant contributions was in advancing proposals for the creation of a naval intelligence committee, whose duties would be to collect together all available intelligence both from naval officers and from the army intelligence department. Those first appointed to the committee were Mr Hoste from the civilian establishment and Commander William Hall. The role of Permanent Secretary included many invitations to social engagements, receptions banquets and dinners. Tryon's guiding rule in choosing which invitations to accept was to seek out people who might have useful information. He stated that he learnt something from everybody.

== Rear Admiral Australian Station (1884) ==
In 1884 Tryon was promoted to rear admiral and placed in command of the Australian Station. He left England on 4 December 1884 on board the P&O steamer Indus, arriving on board his new flagship HMS Nelson in Sydney 22 January 1885. The growing importance of the Australian colonies (at that time separate colonies under the crown rather than united under one Australian government) meant that the squadron was becoming more important also, so now an admiral was appointed to replace the previous commander, Commodore James Erskine. Tryon's political and social skills were considered important for the role, which involved negotiations with the Australian colonies for financing a fast cruiser squadron in the region.

Conflicting interests also existed within Australia, particularly in the northern colony of Queensland, where plantation owners sought to expand their holdings on the northern coastlands using imported cheap native labour. Local 'white' labourers objected to this as it undercut their wages and prospects, and the government also had some objections, preferring to establish a pattern of smaller farms operated by resident owners, rather than absentee landlords creating vast estates. Part of the squadron's duties included patrolling the waters between Queensland and the islands of New Guinea to prevent kidnapping and human trafficking of native labourers to supply new plantations. The South East corner of New Guinea around Port Moresby had only been annexed as a British protectorate the previous year (1884) by Commodore Erskine on behalf of Queen Victoria. The Germans had similarly claimed an area in the north-east corner of the island, and France was using New Caledonia as a penal colony. The convicts would from time to time escape to Australia, where they would cause difficulties.

In spring 1885 tension had been growing between Britain and Russia because of the Penjdeh incident in Afghanistan. This raised considerable concern in Australia of possible Russian raids on shipping, which could not be prevented by the small Australian squadron. The effect was to concentrate minds on the formation of a larger squadron financed by the colonies. Following orders from the Admiralty, Tryon argued the case that defence might best be achieved by a single strong squadron free to move around the whole area, rather than smaller squadrons paid for and attached to individual colonies. That local land forces could be provided to defend individual ports against raids, but that the best way of providing trained and up to date crews and ships for a naval force was to give the task to the Royal Navy rather than forming local ones. Colonies differed in their views on what was best, in particular New Zealand was concerned that part of the force ought permanently to be based at Auckland because of its distance from most of the others. Tryon proposed that a system of indemnity should be introduced, so that anyone whose property was destroyed resisting an attack would be compensated by the colonies as a whole, accepting that local resistance wherever it might occur was to the benefit of all. After the Russian scare had subsided, Tryon continued to assist with the development of land fortifications for major towns, emphasising the importance of preparedness in advance of any military situation arising, and of giving the impression of a united defence even if this had not in reality been entirely achieved.

An initial proposal was made by Tryon for a squadron of six Archer-class ships of 1,800 tons armed with 6-in guns capable of 16 knots costing around £105,000 each, accompanied by eight 150-ton torpedo boats priced around £53,000. However, at this time the French commenced a construction programme for 19-knot cruisers, so the plans were revised. Eventually five 2,500-ton cruisers capable of 19 knots designed by Sir William Henry White were constructed in England and sent to the Australian squadron. A conference of colonial delegates was held in London in 1887 to discuss Australian defence, to which Tryon was not invited despite the large part he had played thus far in negotiations on behalf of the Admiralty and British government. His exclusion from the conference prompted him to request to be relieved from the Australian command after two years rather than the normal term of three.

Tryon as admiral was provided with a house by the New South Wales government on the north shore of Sydney Harbour, near the navy anchorages. This was undergoing refurbishment at the time he took command but, once installed, his time as admiral was well remembered for the programme of social engagements and hospitality given to Sydney society as part of his duties. He took an interest in furthering development of the supply depot and repair dock in Sydney Harbour, and the construction of a new sailors' home to replace an existing one which had become overtaken by demand. Partly because of the unfinished accommodation, and the war scare, his wife did not accompany him to Australia.

Much of Tryon's time was spent in Sydney, but he visited Victoria, Queensland and twice visited New Zealand in the summers (southern hemisphere) of 1885–86 and 1886–87. On the first visit he attempted to reassure ministers that their defence was better served by one combined squadron rather than dispersed ships, even if some were posted there. He also visited the beautiful hot lakes and terraces of the volcanic region, shortly before it was wiped back to blackened ash by an earthquake and eruption.

In April 1887 he handed command of the squadron to Rear Admiral Henry Fairfax before travelling to Melbourne and thence by P&O steamer Ballarat to England. He was commended and thanked by the lords of the Admiralty for his efforts in encouraging adoption of a combined defensive position by the Australian colonies, and contributed in some part to encouraging the states to work increasingly closer together and move towards unification. Shortly after returning home he was awarded the KCB for his services in Australia in the Jubilee honours list.

== Parliamentary candidate 1887 ==
Tryon stood for parliament in a by-election held on 1 July 1887 in the Spalding division of Lincolnshire. He was hampered in the campaign by having only reached England on 5 June and the constituency on the 14th, and by an injured leg acquired during the voyage requiring him to walk with a stick. He stood on a platform of maintaining the union of Britain with Ireland, which mirrored his own views from his Australian experience that the colonies there should unite. It was his intention also to speak on colonial issues in the House once elected. He was aided by unionists from northern Ireland who came to plead their cause, but opposed by a local candidate who had had two years to become known and had his own supporting Parnellites from Ireland to tell their own stories. At the time there was a considerable depression in agriculture, and this was the deciding issue in this rural constituency. Farmers sided with Tryon and the unionist government, while their workers who had suffered pay cuts and lost jobs, causing many to emigrate or move away splitting up families, sided with his Liberal opponent, Halley Stewart. Halley Stewart received 5110 votes against Tryon's 4363. At the previous election in 1886 Stewart had lost by 288 votes. It was considered that Tryon's lack of agricultural background had counted against him.

From June 1887 to April 1888 Tryon remained on half pay enjoying time with his family. He suffered a broken arm in a fall from a stable attic while visiting his mother in law, Lady Willoughby de Eresby at Grimsthorpe Castle in Lincolnshire. Tryon showed considerable regard for his mother in law, who died not long afterwards in November 1888.

== Admiral Superintendent of Reserves 1888 ==
In April 1888 Tryon was appointed Admiral Superintendent of Reserves, which included the coastguard service, and became chairman of a committee on coastguard buildings. He was promoted to vice-admiral on 15 August 1889.

In 1891 Tryon chaired a committee on naval reserves, where he expressed his views on the importance of cooperation between merchant shipping and the navy in times of war. The committee consisted of Allen Young, C. Rivers Wilson, Thomas Ismay, and two or three naval officers. The committee noted that although traditionally the merchant navy was looked upon as a pool of trained sailors which could be called upon in wartime, the proportion of non-British sailors in British ships was steadily increasing. Moreover, that modern warships were becoming increasingly different from merchant ships, so it was felt a man could not simply be called from a merchantman and placed into a naval ship. A system of reserves was required where men received training and a retainer fee to be ready for war service when needed. Tryon felt it important that men from the reserve should wear the same uniform as regular sailors, so that no sense of inferiority might attach to them. Tryon had been impressed by the quality of merchant sailors serving in the Naval Brigade in Crimea.

Tryon was consulted on the best design for new battleships following the Naval Defence Act 1889, which had authorised seventy new ships including ten battleships. Tryon favoured a high freeboard to allow ships to perform well in rough seas, guns at least twenty-three feet above the waterline, and a minimum length of 380 feet. He opposed the very large 100-ton guns which had become available at that time, preferring smaller guns of around 45 tons. This proved a correct choice, as the 100-ton guns which did enter service proved unsuccessful. Their introduction had been experimental and in part in reaction to other navies trying such guns.

=== 1888 naval manoeuvres, 'Achill admiral' ===
In 1885 a programme of annual naval manoeuvres had begun, where the British navy would divide into opposing fleets and conduct war exercises as near as possible to real conditions which might be experienced. By 1888 this had become a source of great interest to the public and the navy alike. The navy encouraged attention, allowing reporters on board during manoeuvres, believing that the publicity furthered their campaigns for greater funding. That year, the intention was to test the practicality of blockading an enemy fleet in its home ports when the ships concerned were modern iron and steam vessels rather than traditional sailing ships. The idea was that a superior fleet, taking the role of the British, would surprise an inferior enemy force before it could sail from two home ports.

Tryon commanded the 'Achill' fleet based in Berehaven in Bantry Bay on the south-west coast of Ireland and Lough Swilly on the north coast. Tryon chose the nickname 'Achill admiral' for himself, from the name of an island midway between the two bases. All Irish territory was considered friendly to 'Achill', and hostile to their opponents. The 'Achill' fleet consisted of 19 major warships and 12 first class torpedo boats. The major warships were as follows:

- Ironclads: Hercules, Ajax, Hero, Rupert, Warspite, Rodney, Devastation, Invincible, and Black Prince.
- Unarmoured ships: Severn, Volage, Iris, Cossack, Sandfly, Amphion, Calypso, Serpent, Curlew, and Spider.

Opposing was Vice Admiral John K.E. Baird, whose force of 26 major warships and 12 first class torpedo boats represented the British fleet. England, Scotland and Wales were considered friendly to the 'British' fleet and hostile to 'Achill'. Baird's major warships consisted of:

- Ironclads: Northumberland, Benbow, Collingwood, Monarch, Conqueror, Hotspur, Northampton, Agincourt, Inflexible, Neptune, Iron Duke, Belleisle and Shannon.
- Unarmoured ships: Mersey, Arethusa, Rover, Active, Racoon, Rattlesnake, Thames, Inconstant, Mercury, Mohawk, Tartar, and Grasshopper.

Hostilities commenced on 24 July. Tryon was of the view at the outset that there was little he could do directly against the superior force, so he set about attempting to wear down his enemy, using feints and false alarms to reduce their attentiveness. They had to continuously maintain station outside his ports, while he and his men enjoyed the Irish countryside. They suffered the difficulties of communicating while at sea whereas Tryon could simply use the telegraph. Albert Markham commanded the blockader's squadron of cruisers, whose job was to stay close to Berehaven, watch for ship movements and attack anyone who emerged, while the ironclads stayed further away.

On the first day Tryon feinted, pretending to send out two torpedo boats and a battleship, causing Markham to scurry to intercept. For the next two days he did nothing, except fire occasional shots at Markham's ships from shore batteries if they came too close. On the fourth evening he sent out two torpedo boats showing no lights with the intention of starting more false alarms. The boats did well, returning with four enemy torpedo boats which they had surprised and captured. By 3 August the enemy had been at sea for nine days and aside from the tedium of their wait would now be low on coal. Tryon ordered all ships to be ready to sail at 9.30 pm on 3 August and for all the upper parts of the ships to be painted black. The fastest ships, Warspite, Iris, Severn, Volage, Cossack and three torpedo boats left via the western entrance, staying as close to the shore as they dared, heading for the Atlantic. Meanwhile, Tryon took the remaining larger ships through the eastern entrance, giving the appearance of an attempt to break through the blockading ships. Within an hour the Hercules was spotted and great excitement broke out amongst the blockaders. Tryon immediately turned around and headed back to port. Just as they returned to anchor, flares at sea showed that, too late, one blockader had spotted Tryon's escaping ships.

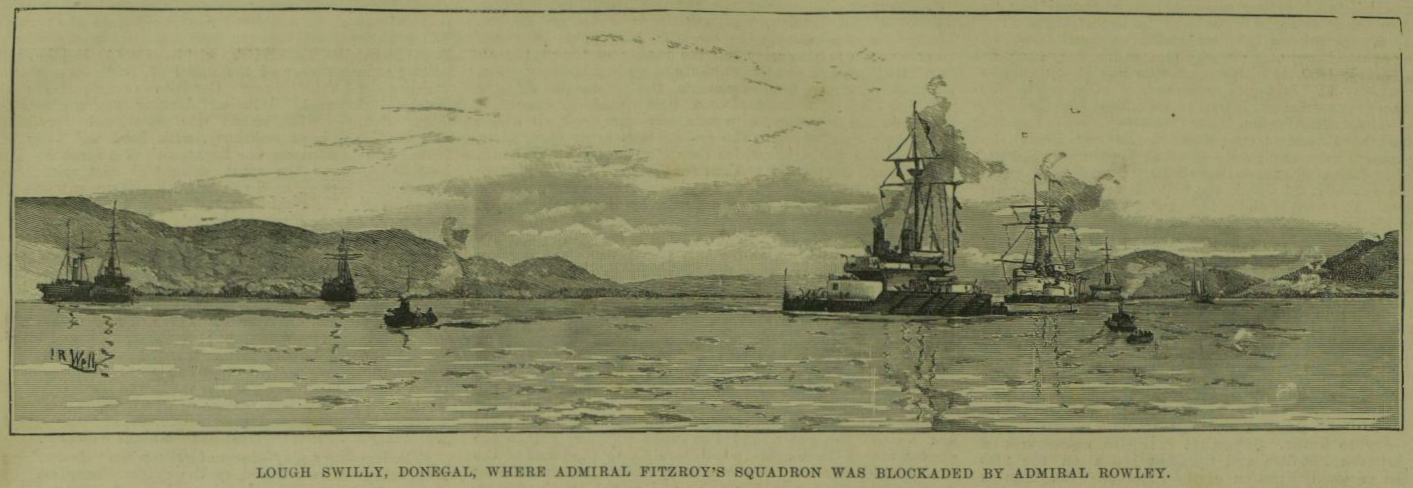
Lough Swilly, Donegal where Admiral Fitzroy's squadron was blockaded by Admiral Rowley, 1888

Admiral Fitzroy at Lough Swilley with Rodney and two other ships also broke the blockade on 4 August, joining Tryon's ships which had escaped.

Baird, on discovering the breakout, had no choice but to break off the failed blockade. He sent his deputy Admiral Rowley to guard Liverpool, while himself proceeding to coal at Portland, ready to defend the Thames and London. Fitzroy took his ships north around Scotland, 'destroying' Aberdeen, Grimsby, Newcastle and the ships berthed there, before returning to Lough Swilley. Meanwhile, Tryon, no longer blockaded at Berehaven, took his slower ships to Lough Swilley, where they joined the similar slow ships from Fitzroy's command, before proceeding to attack Liverpool. He claimed Belleisle, which had been guarding the port, as captured, and 'destroyed' the shipping there. Baird regrouped his forces to defend London, leaving Tryon in command of the English Channel and most of the rest of the British coast.

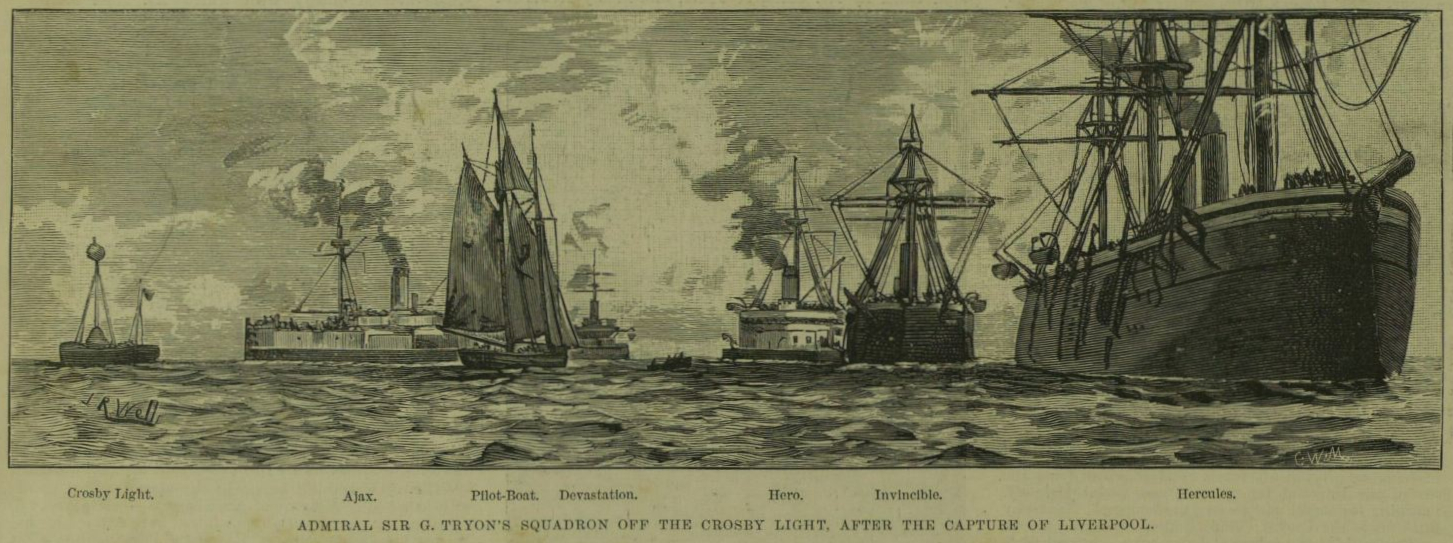
Admiral Sir G. Tryon's squadron off the Crosby Light, after the capture of Liverpool. the Naval Manoeuvres of 1888

Tryon was criticised by officers from the enemy fleet that he had not given due warning to merchant vessels before attacking, nor allowed their crews time to escape as required under international law. He had bombarded defenceless cities and 'killed' civilians, and it was claimed he used false flags and captured signalling equipment. He was praised by the Admiralty for his handling of the fleet, but his opponents in turn felt criticised for their failings. The public felt comforted that such an officer was really on the British side.

The conclusion drawn from the exercise was the serious danger posed by even a small force of fast ships, and the need for considerably greater forces than those available in the exercise to successfully impose a blockade. The official report of events was prepared by Admirals Sir William Dowell, Sir Vesey Hamilton and Sir Frederick Richards. They stressed the importance to Britain of an effective navy to protect its waters and the much greater importance of this to the country as a whole than the army. If control of the seas around Britain could be maintained, then no army was needed to defend it. Whereas, if control was lost then no army however great would suffice to defend it, because it must starve deprived of shipping. This contributed to the adoption of the principle that the British navy must equal the combined force of the other two greatest world navies.

Shortly after the manoeuvres, Tryon wrote a fictional history of the 'Achill' campaign, describing the opening events of the war against a foreign naval power which had just been played out in the exercise, then going on with an account of what happened next. This incorporated and publicised many of his own views about how national defence should be conducted, without mentioning any real countries which might take offence.

=== 1889 naval manoeuvres ===
The manoeuvres of 1889 were similar to the previous year, with an enemy fleet based at Queenstown and Berehaven, but this time Baird commanded the 'enemy' fleet and Tryon the 'British'. Baird's task was to launch raids against Britain, and while Tryon would not attempt to blockade his enemy in port, it was his task to prevent the raiding. Both admirals had slow flagships, while their seconds-in-command, Tracey for Tryon's fleet and D'Arcy Irvine for Baird, had fast ships. Tryon's headquarters was at Milford Haven but he moved to Falmouth during the exercise.

Baird attempted to send his fast battleships by different routes to regroup off Dover and then attack the Thames. Tryon succeeded in intercepting him, and was deemed to capture Camperdown, Immortalite and Hero. Tryon also managed to seal up Baird's slower ships in Queenstown. After the abortive attack on London, D'Arcy-Irvine with Anson and Collingwood was sent to raid the north of Scotland where he ransomed Aberdeen and Edinburgh. He was now joined by the slower but powerful Inflexible and proceeded down the east coast of Britain, bombarding Newcastle and Sunderland. On the day before the exercise was to end they moved on to Scarborough, but were surprised in hazy weather by Tracey with Rodney, Howe, Ajax and three cruisers. D'Arcy Irvine was obliged to retreat, but the slow Inflexible was surrounded and captured. Collingwood was caught next, but D'Arcy-Irvine managed to escape with Anson.

The four umpires (Admirals Bowden-Smith and Morant accompanying Baird, Lord Charles Scott and Sir R. Molyneux with Tryon) found that Tryon had succeeded in his objective as well as might be done with the inadequate ships at his disposal, but that had the exercise continued his capture of enemy ships would have given him an advantage. Baird's raid on the Thames had failed, but with six fast cruisers he had managed to capture ninety-five merchant ships around the British coast. The cruisers had been chased by Tryon's ships several times, but were able to run and continue elsewhere.

=== 1890 naval manoeuvres ===
Tryon and Tracey commanded a 'British' fleet a little larger than their enemy commanded by Sir Michael Seymour and Admiral Robinson. Seymour's task was to remain at sea interfering with British trade but avoiding action, while Tryon was to attempt to chase him down. Seymour was given 24 hours start from Berehaven before Tryon was allowed to sail from English ports, although Tryon was allowed to use cruisers to scout his movements. Obtaining supplies of coal for the ships was the limiting factor, and Seymour overcame this difficulty by arranging colliers to meet his fleet at sea. Thus he picked a spot off the trade routes he wished to attack, and stayed there. Tryon succeeded in defending the Channel, but could not prevent Seymour intercepting merchant ships 300 miles away at sea. Tryon commented that although this year's exercises were on the face of it the least exciting, they had still been the most useful of the three.

The exercises were not without critics as to whether they accurately represented real war situations. A number of captains were criticised for not taking the rules sufficiently seriously, continuing to fight their ships after they should have considered themselves sunk or captured. Vice-Admiral Batsch of the German navy published a critique of the '88 and '89 exercises, arguing that the objectives of the admirals had become reversed from those of a real war, where coastal raids would follow opportunistically to main fleet engagements, rather than being main aims in themselves. In the '89 exercise the enemy fleet started at a 25% disadvantage, but steady attrition during raiding reduced it to 43% the size of the British fleet, so that any chance of a decisive victory steadily diminished. The result of dividing forces had been that they were picked off one by one. Nevertheless, the exercises served to improve morale for the sailors concerned, and to raise considerable interest amongst the general public in naval affairs.

=== Wartime Marine Insurance ===
Tryon became a strong supporter of the idea that in time of war there should be a national insurance scheme for merchant vessels. He was concerned that in the event of war insurance rates for vessels against loss by enemy action would immediately become impossibly high, so that merchant ships would simply stop trading with Britain, even if the numbers being lost were relatively small. This would be disastrous for the country, so it would be far better for the government to implement its own scheme to reimburse owners for lost cargoes and ships.

Tryon claimed that he had first heard of the idea from Admiral Hopkins. Having become convinced of its importance he wrote an article explaining the idea in the 'United Service Magazine' of May 1890 as well as having pamphlets printed which he distributed to those likely to be interested. The idea gave rise to an immense amount of discussion nationally. The Times came out against the idea of government intervention in commerce, arguing the important issue was not who paid for sunk ships, but having a navy capable of preventing them being sunk. It argued that the scheme was a diversion from this main objective and would simply provide a false sense of security. Many smaller papers took the same line, as did a number of naval officers including Lord Charles Beresford. Their concern was chiefly that a government might see the scheme as an alternative to a larger navy.

Tryon responded in a letter to The Times on 19 September arguing the need for the scheme whatever the size of the navy. The Chairman of P&O, Sir Thomas Sutherland, wrote arguing that a scheme ought to be considered and prepared in peace time, but no legislation should be passed or anything else done unless an actual war situation arose. When it did, it might turn out that insurance would be available privately or that shipowners might benefit from higher wartime profits. He questioned whether any amount of compensation would convince owners to send ships if they expected them to be lost. Sir Arthur Forwood (shipowner and later parliamentary secretary to the Admiralty) wrote observing that during the American war of Independence shipowners had responded to the initial insurance rate of 20% by building better ships and choosing their routes carefully, with the results that the best blockade runners could then obtain lower premiums. He added that they bought cotton at 2d, and sold it at 2s, a 1000% profit if they succeeded. Retired admiral Alfred Chatfield, then a city businessman, observed that the scheme would disproportionately favour smaller and slower ships at the greatest risk of enemy capture, perhaps even making them more profitable and thus discouraging the construction of safer but more expensive replacements. Others, such as Thomas Ismay of the White Star line were in favour of the plan, arguing it would prevent many ships simply being laid up in safety for the duration of hostilities, and suggesting that many who were relying on flying under a neutral flag which theoretically guaranteed safety, were liable for a nasty surprise. Tryon himself argued that the scheme might only be needed at the onset of hostility until shippers had become accustomed to the safest ways of maintaining trade.

== C-in-C Mediterranean Fleet 1891 ==
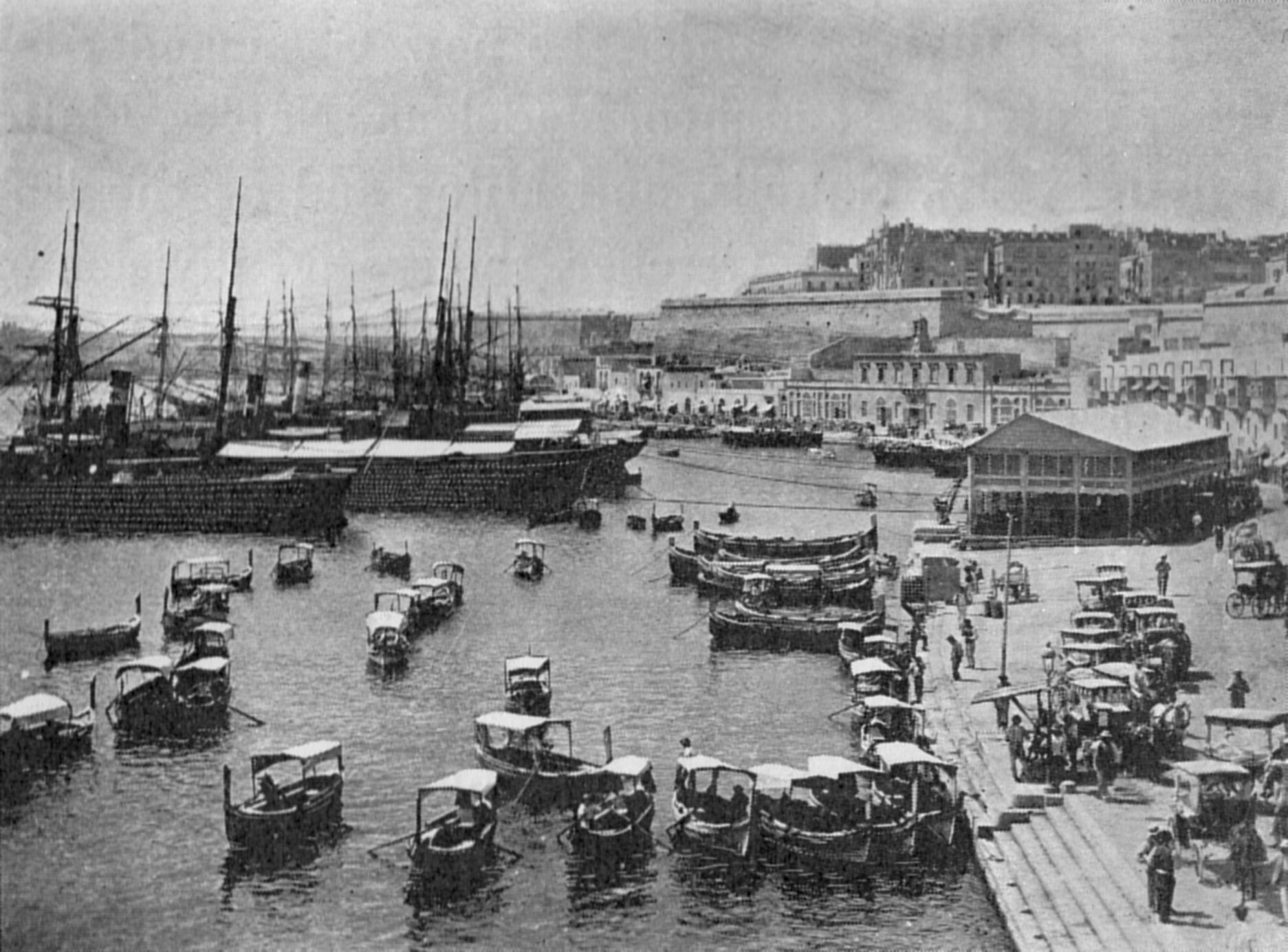
Grand Harbour, Malta, home of the British Mediterranean Fleet

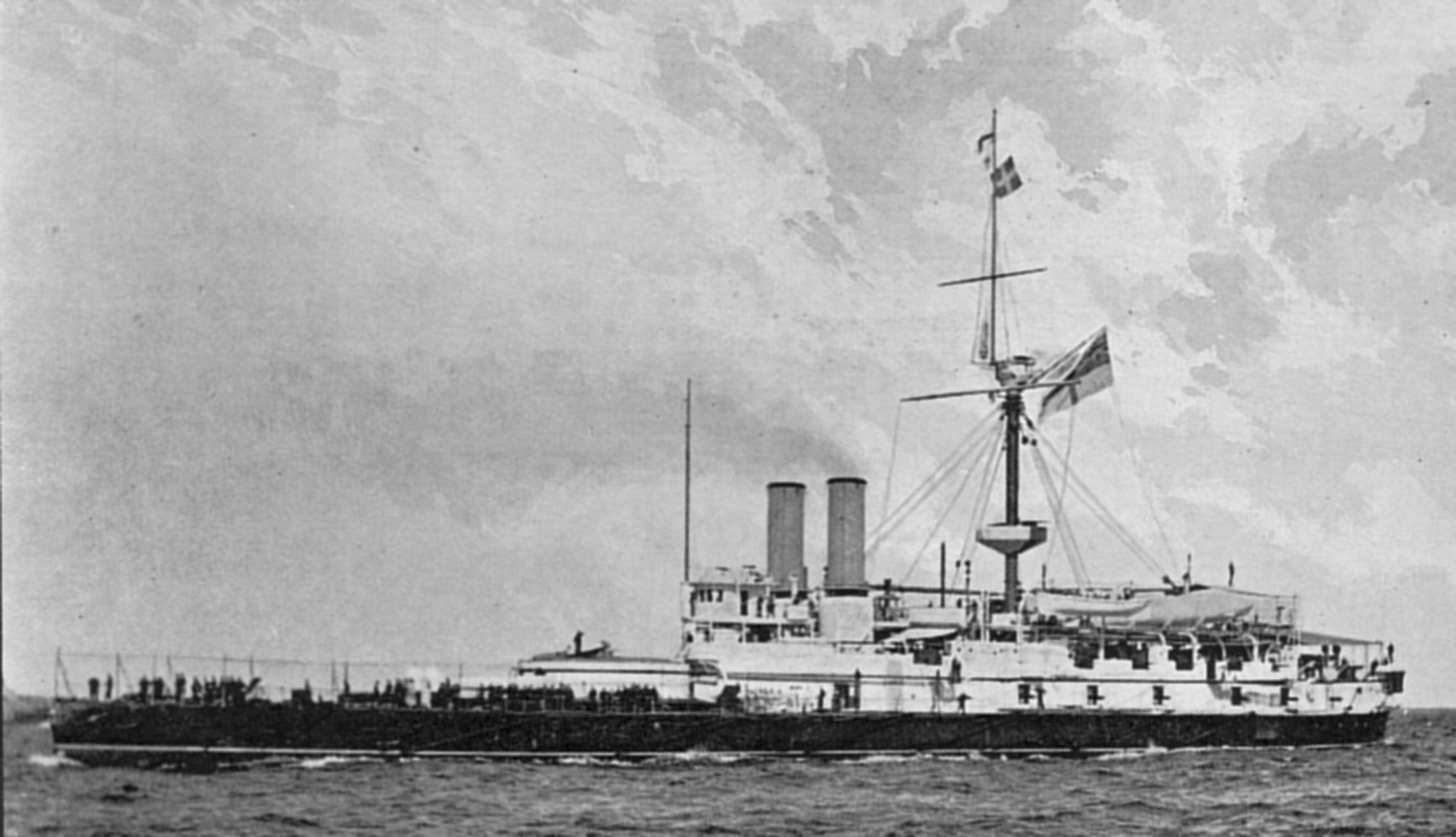
HMS Victoria, the flagship of the Mediterranean Fleet

In August 1891 Tryon was appointed to command the Mediterranean station, the most powerful force within the Royal Navy at that time. The Mediterranean was recognised as the sea area then of greatest importance to Britain. Tryon left England on 11 September on board HMS Nile meeting the first division of the fleet under its previous commander, vice admiral Sir Anthony Hoskins, on board the flagship HMS Victoria at Gibraltar. Tryon assumed command on 21 September. The division toured Port Mahon, Madelena, Naples, Malta, Nauplia and Milo, where they were joined by the second division under Rear Admiral Lord Walter Kerr. The fleet then exercised until November, when they again divided: the first division wintering at Malta while the second remained in the Levant.

Each year the fleet held a regatta where officers and men from different ships competed against each other, training for months in advance. It was customary for the admiral to provide a cup to be presented to the winner of a sailing race between bona fide service boats of all types. In November 1891 the regatta took place at Suda Bay and the winner of 'the admiral's cup' from 60 boats was Lieutenant Evan-Thomas. The race was initially instituted by admiral Phipps Hornby in 1872 with the intention of encouraging skill in sailing, which was becoming a sideline in a steam powered navy.

One of Tryon's first actions as commander was to write a memorandum to all commanders requesting that they draw to his attention anything which might concern the fleet or British interests which they might discover but which in the ordinary way they would not pass on. After the grounding of HMS Howe in 1892 he circulated a memorandum to the fleet concerning safe manoeuvring of ships, particularly in difficult circumstances. Of particular relevance to later events, the memorandum warned commanders that their first duty was always to safeguard their ship (at least, during times of peace) and that should they ever be faced with an order which for some reason might be dangerous, then they should attempt to carry out the intention of the order, but only if it could be done without risk to their ship or others.

As at other stations, the commander of the fleet was provided with a residence and expected to entertain society. The admiral's house in the Strada Mezzodi was one of the smaller auberges, originally palaces for the Knights of St. John. The small size was a disadvantage for the lavish parties which Tryon and his wife were expected to host, but the parties held in the winters of 1891–92 and 1892–93 were very popular. The admiral was the second most important person on the island, after the Governor. The admiral's other duties, aside from running the fleet, included corresponding with the director of Naval Intelligence, Captain Cyprian Bridge, passing on and receiving intelligence reports. This required replying personally to information received from his officers: he was described as a fast writer but with difficult handwriting. The correspondence covered everything from problems the Italian were having with their carrier pigeons to details of international law.

=== TA, manoeuvres without signals ===
Admiral Tryon was concerned that the normal system of signalling between ships would become unworkable in real war conditions. To send a signal required hoisting a flag sequence, waiting for all ships to raise flags to confirm they had seen and understood, and then lowering the initial flags to signal everyone to carry it out. The signals book had grown to hundreds of pages describing the many possible flag combinations and virtually no one knew them all. In a real battle this process might take too much time, or might be entirely impossible if enemy fire had destroyed the masts from which the flags must fly, or smoke made them impossible to read. Instead, Tryon proposed a simple signal, using the letter-flags T and A, which simply instructed captains to follow their leader. Other flag signals might be used additionally as circumstances allowed, but once the initial order was given, the ships simply had to follow the movements of their leaders. A few, basic, single flag signals were designated for particular movements, which would simply be flown without needing acknowledgement. This was a radical departure from contemporary practice, in which all movements were precisely signalled from the flagship and acknowledged by their recipients. Opinion was fiercely divided about it; for instance, The Times considered it "unsound in theory and perilous in practice", whilst Rear-Admiral William Kennedy on the East Indies station declared following experiments with it that "the officers commanding thoroughly appreciated the idea which would be invaluable in time of war".

=== Grounding of HMS Victoria ===
HMS Victoria, flagship of the Mediterranean fleet, was in retrospect an unlucky ship. In January 1892 she was at Platea in Greece carrying out exercises firing torpedoes, when she ran aground on Snipe Point. Tryon was not on board, as the fleet ships went individually for torpedo practice. This involved firing torpedoes while travelling at speed, but was made more difficult by the need to conduct the practices in shallow waters so the torpedoes could be recovered. Captain Bourke had sent men to mark the point where the waters shallowed to ten fathoms, but they had misjudged the buoy's proper position. Victoria ran aground at nine knots, leaving the fore end of the ship seven feet higher out of the water than normal, while the stern still had 66 feet of water beneath it. The ship was secured with anchors and unsuccessful attempts were made by the nearby torpedo-depot ship to tow her free. Tryon arrived from Malta on board the Surprise, having given orders for the dockyard tug Sampson, Phaeton, Edinburgh, Dreadnought, Scout and Humber to come to assist. Victoria was refloated six days after grounding, towed by Dreadnought and Edinburgh, with the tug lashed to her side and her own engines running astern. 1200 tons had been removed from the ship to lighten her. Victoria returned to Malta for repairs to torn plates along her bottom.

Victoria was repaired in time for the fleet summer cruise in May. The first division sailed from Malta on 31 May for Nauplia, where they were joined by the second division commanded by Rear Admiral Markham. The entire fleet then exercised in the Aegean Sea. In June Tryon visited the Sultan of Turkey in Constantinople. Warships were not permitted in the Dardanelles, so the party went on the admiral's steam yacht, Surprise. Captains Bourke from Victoria, Noel from Nile and Wilson from Sans Pareil accompanied Tryon, who received the Medjidie of the first class from the Sultan. They rejoined the fleet at Vourlah Bay on 25 June. In July the fleet divided, with the second division going to the Levant while Tryon and the first division went to Sicily, where the volcano Mount Etna was erupting. The tour continued around Italian and Spanish ports with a fortnight at Gibraltar, before returning to Malta on 29 September. On 10 October once again they set out to Nauplia to meet the second division.

The annual regatta pulling races were held at Salonica, and the sailing races at Lemnos. An additional prize was presented by the Vali of Salonica to the winners of the all-comers race. Tryon directed that the junior midshipman should accept the prize for the winners, on the grounds that he would most likely live longest to remember the event. The sailing events took place at Moudros Bay, a large expanse of water largely surrounded by low-lying land providing good sailing conditions, and plenty of opportunity for officers to go ashore and hunt local game. On this occasion the admiral's cup was won by Commander Tate of the Colossus. The two divisions now separated again, the first with Tryon returning to Malta for the winter.

=== Sinking of HMS Victoria and drowning of Vice-Admiral Tryon ===
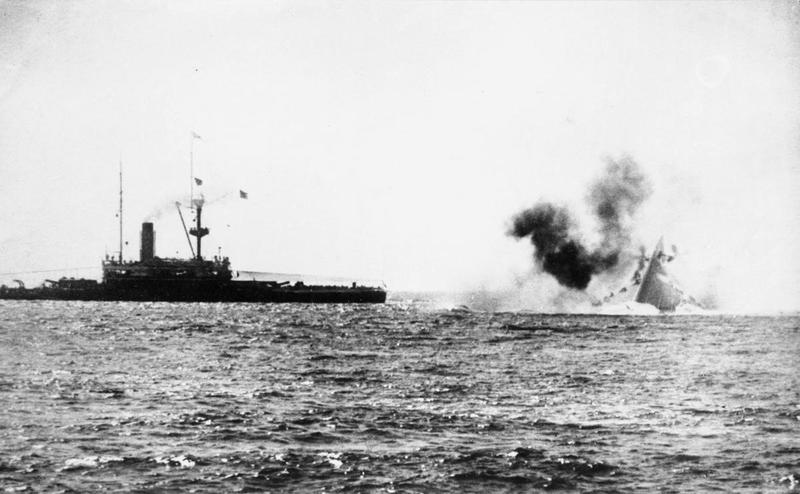
Victoria sinking after colliding with HMS Camperdown

On 22 June 1893, the fleet was on exercises when Tryon's flagship, HMS Victoria, sank following a bizarre order from him which brought it in collision with the flagship of his second-in-command, Rear Admiral Sir Albert Markham. Tryon went down with his ship, his last reported words being "It is all my fault". Tryon was considered by many of his contemporaries to be a supremely competent yet radical officer, but with a strong and sometimes overbearing personality. This manner was felt to be a contributory cause to the accident. For instance, an article in Society Journal Talk in July 1893 (following the accident) said, "Much has been said about George Tryon's charm of manner, and the rest of it, but in truth he was, at any rate when officially engaged, a very brusque and dictatorial man. Unfortunately he was a 'viewy' man too, a man of theories ..."

== Personal life ==
Tryon's son was the Conservative politician, George Tryon, 1st Baron Tryon.

== See also ==
- Battle of Sinop
- British Mediterranean Fleet

== Bibliography ==
- Andrew Gordon, The Rules of the Game: Jutland and British Naval Command, John Murray, London, 1996. ISBN 0-7195-5076-9
- Richard Hough, Admirals in Collision, Hamish Hamilton Ltd, London, 1959.
- Rear-Admiral C. C. Penrose Fitzgerald, Life of Vice-Admiral Sir George Tryon K. C. B., William Blackwood and sons, Edinburgh and London, 1897

Government offices
Preceded by Sir Robert George Crookshank Hamilton	Permanent Secretary to the Admiralty; 1883–1884 (acting 1882–1883)	Succeeded by Sir Evan MacGregor
Military offices
Preceded by James Erskine	Commander-in-Chief, Australia Station; 1884–1887	Succeeded by Henry Fairfax
Preceded by Sir Anthony Hoskins	Commander-in-Chief, Mediterranean Fleet; 1891–1893	Succeeded by Sir Michael Culme-Seymour
