= Samuel Gurney Cresswell =

English painter

Captain Samuel Gurney Cresswell
- Born: 25 September 1827; King's Lynn, Norfolk, England
- Died: 14 August 1867 (aged 39); King's Lynn, England
- Burial place: North Runcton, Norfolk, England
- Military career
- Allegiance: England
- Branch: Royal Navy
- Service years: 1842–1867
- Rank: Captain
- Conflicts: Crimean War's Baltic theatre; Second Opium War
- Awards: Mentioned in Despatches (4)

Samuel Gurney Cresswell (25 September 1827 – 14 August 1867), was a Royal Navy officer. He was technically the first naval officer to cross the entire Northwest Passage. Robert McClure was in charge of the expedition but Cresswell reached England first.

== Early years ==
Cresswell was born in King's Lynn, Norfolk, England in 1827. His parents were Francis Cresswell, Esq. (born 1789) and Rachel Elizabeth Fry (born 1803, London, Middlesex, daughter of Elizabeth Fry). Cresswell had two older brothers (Frank Joseph and Addison John), and three that were younger (William Edward, Gerard Oswin, and Oswald). He had one sister, Harriet France Elizabeth. The Cresswells' circle in Norfolk included the Gurneys as well as Sir Edward Parry.

== Career ==
He joined the Navy in 1842, and served in the seas off China where he encountered pirates. In 1846 he served on the personal staff of Rear-Admiral Sir Thomas John Cochrane in an expedition in Brunei, and was Mentioned in Despatches. A few years later, he participated in the 1848-49 Arctic rescue efforts for Sir John Franklin under Sir James Clark Ross. He was promoted mate on 6 April 1848, and thanks to his good performance in the Arctic, to lieutenant on 10 September 1849.

Cresswell was appointed as the second lieutenant and ship's artist aboard HMS Investigator under Robert McClure during the Arctic expedition in search of the Northwest Passage. During this voyage, Cresswell sketched and painted several depictions of their life in the Arctic. With the Investigator locked in ice from September 1851 through the spring of 1853, several men became invalid, and Cresswell was put in charge of transporting them to Captain Henry Kellett's ship 160 mi (260 km) away which Cresswell and the Inuit interpreter J.A. Miertsching accomplished with no loss of life. Kellett then sent Cresswell with additional invalid men to Beechey Island. When ice conditions finally permitted ship travel, Cresswell finally headed for England, arriving in autumn 1853 with the announcement that the Northwest Passage had finally been located. Upon his return to England, Parry declared that Cresswell, then a lieutenant, was the first person to traverse the Northwest Passage, though in actuality, Cresswell was the first naval officer to cross the entire Northwest Passage.

Cresswell's numerous water-colour paintings made during the Ross and McClure expeditions leave behind a pictorial record of the activities and terrain. Some of the sketches were presented to Queen Victoria. A subsequent folio volume of lithographic views of the drawings, A Series of Eight Sketches in Colour, together with a Chart of the Route of the Voyage of H.M.S. 'Investigator' during the Discovery of the North West Passage, was published in London in 1854. In the same year, he was promoted to the rank of commander on 21 October (again for his Arctic service), and served in the Crimean War's Baltic theatre. Three years later, in command of HMS Surprise, he participated in the Second Opium War, receiving three further Mentions in Despatches, one being for the attack on the Taku Forts. He was also promoted to the rank of captain on 17 September 1858 for his actions on the Hai River, but due to ill-health, was unable to accept any further appointments.

== Personal life ==
Cresswell never married. He was an avid book collector. He retired in 1867 and died soon after at his birthplace of King's Lynn, age 39.
