= Arrow-class gunvessel =

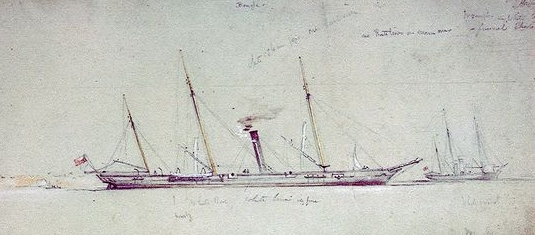
- HMS Beagle and Wrangler by Sir Oswald Brierly, 1855

Class overview
- Name: Arrow class
- Builders: C J Mare & Company, Leamouth; R & H Green, Blackwall Yard; Messrs. Rennie, Greenwich
- Operators: Royal Navy; (Empire of Japan) Japanese Army; (Argentina) Argentine Navy
- Cost: £21,234 (Arrow); £24,860 (Wrangler)
- Built: 1854
- In commission: 1854–1866, 1875-1902
- Completed: 7
- Lost: 0

General characteristics
- Displacement: 586 tons
- Tons burthen: 476 68/94 bm
- Length: 160 ft (48.8 m)
- Beam: 25 ft (7.6 m)
- Draught: 11 ft 8 in (3.6 m) (aft)
- Depth of hold: 13 ft 3 in (4.0 m)
- Installed power: 160 nhp; 460–673 ihp (343–502 kW)
- Propulsion: Single 2-cylinder horizontal single-expansion steam engine; Single screw
- Sail plan: Barque-rigged
- Complement: 65
- Armament: 2 × 68-pounder (95 cwt) Lancaster MLR on pivots; 4 × 32-pounder (25 cwt) guns

The Arrow class comprised six second-class screw-driven vessels built as dispatch vessels for the Royal Navy in 1854, mounting six guns. In 1856 they were re-designated as second-class gunvessels. A seventh vessel was built for the Argentine Navy in 1875.

== Construction ==
=== Design ===
The Crimean War sparked a sudden need for shallow-draught, manoeuvrable vessels for inshore work in the Baltic and the Black Sea. The Arrow class of six wooden-hulled screw steamers were built during 1854 to a design by the Surveyor's Department. Construction was undertaken at two commercial yards on the Thames, R & H Green at Blackwall Yard and C J Mare & Company, at Leamouth. Two further designs of Crimean War gunvessel were ordered during 1855, the Intrepid class and the Vigilant class, and in 1856 the six Arrow-class dispatch vessels were re-classed as second-class gunvessels.

=== Propulsion ===
A two-cylinder horizontal single expansion steam engine provided 160 horsepower (119 kW) through a single screw.

=== Sail plan ===
All Arrow-class gunvessels were barque-rigged.

=== Armament ===
The Arrow class were provided with two 68-pounder Lancaster muzzle-loading rifles weighing 95 long cwt (4,800 kg) on pivot mounts, and four 32-pounder 25 long cwt (1,300 kg) guns.

== Ships ==
Name	Ship builder	Launched	Fate
Arrow	C J Mare & Company, Leamouth	26 June 1854	Hull sold to Marshall on 19 May 1862
Beagle	C J Mare & Company, Leamouth	20 July 1854	Sold at Hong Kong on 16 July 1863, became the Japanese Kanko. Broken up 1889
Lynx	C J Mare & Company, Leamouth	22 July 1854	Sold to Marshall on 19 May 1862 for breaking at Plymouth
Snake	C J Mare & Company, Leamouth	6 September 1854	Sold to Marshall, Plymouth in 1864
Viper	R & H Green, Blackwall Yard	23 July 1854	Sold to Marshall on 19 May 1862 for breaking at Plymouth
Wrangler	R & H Green, Blackwall Yard	19 June 1854	Broken up by Castle at Charlton in May 1866
Bermejo	Messrs. Rennie	19 June 1875	For Argentine Navy.

== Operational lives ==
Wrangler was sent to the Baltic on completion, and the others of the class to the Black Sea where they took part in the Crimean War. The Lancaster guns were not entirely successful, and the class had their armament reduced, being employed in their original designation as dispatch vessels.
