= 68-pounder Lancaster gun =

British 19th century cannon

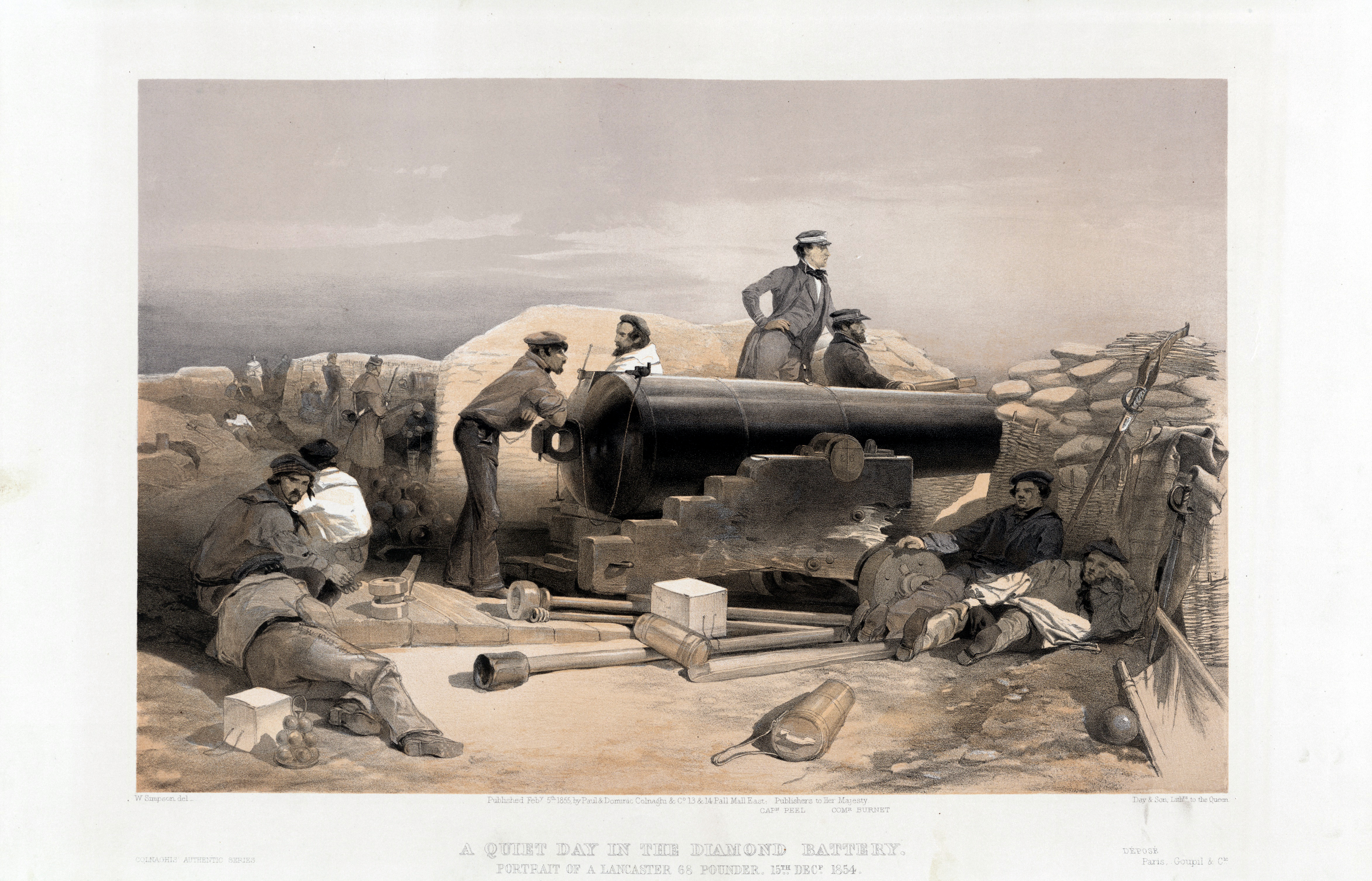
"A Quiet Day in the Diamond Battery", 15 December 1854, by William Simpson. Depicts naval guns deployed ashore in the Crimean War.

68-pounder Lancaster guns were a British rifled muzzle-loading cannon of the 1850s that fired a 68-pound shell. It was designed by Charles William Lancaster. The cannon was designed with an oval bore and had a range of about 6,500 yd (5.9 km). The gun had a tendency to burst and jam.

They were fitted in pairs to the Arrow-class gunvessel and were used during the Crimean War.

The muzzle of a Lancaster gun survives in the collection of the Royal Armouries at Fort Nelson.
