= Ramsay's Kitchen Nightmares =

2004–2014 British television programme

- Starring: Gordon Ramsay
- Narrated by: Gordon Ramsay
- Country of origin: United Kingdom
- Original language: English
- No. of series: 7
- No. of episodes: 35 (27 originals and 8 revisits)

Production
- Running time: 47–49 minutes

Original release
- Network: Channel 4
- Release: 27 April 2004 – 14 October 2014

Related
- Kitchen Nightmares

Ramsay's Kitchen Nightmares is a television programme featuring British celebrity chef Gordon Ramsay first broadcast on Channel 4 in 2004. In each episode, Ramsay visits a failing restaurant and acts as a troubleshooter to help improve the establishment in just one week. Ramsay revisits the restaurant a few months later to see how business has fared in his absence. Episodes from series one and two have been re-edited with additional new material as Ramsay's Kitchen Nightmares Revisited; they featured Ramsay checking up on restaurants a year or more after he attended to them.

In 2009, it was reported that fourteen of the 22 restaurants featured on the show to that point had closed, with some owners directly blaming Ramsay and the show for their demise.

== Background ==
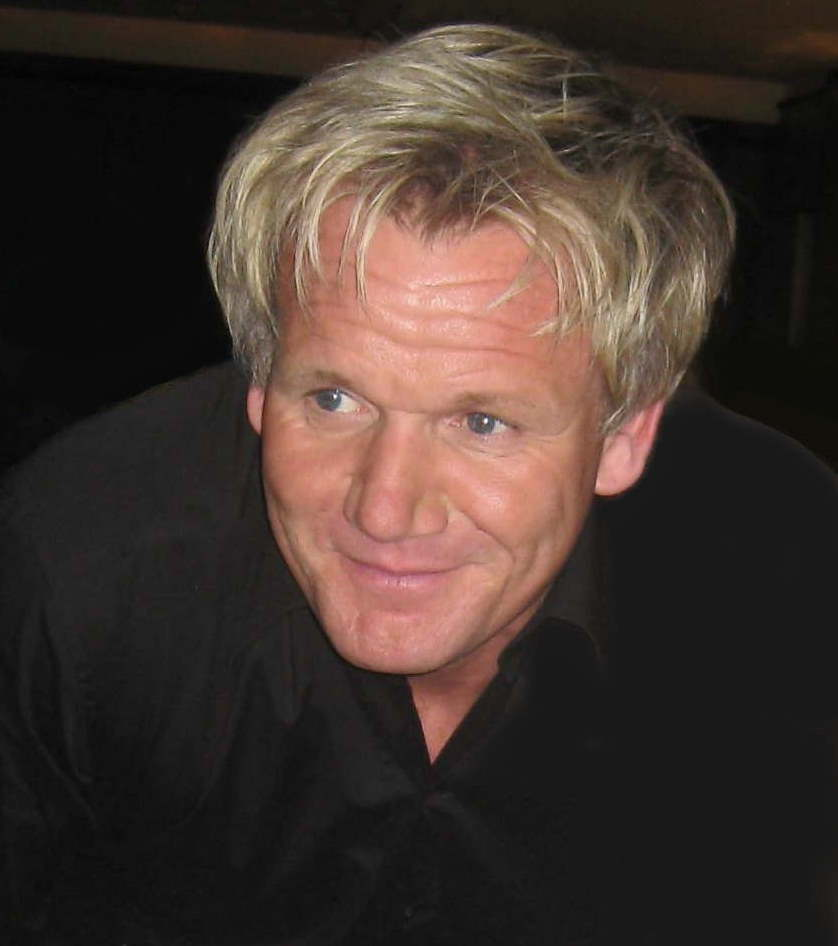
Gordon Ramsay in 2010

An American adaptation of this show, titled Kitchen Nightmares, debuted 19 September 2007 on Fox. It is broadcast in the UK on Channel 4 as Ramsay's Kitchen Nightmares USA to avoid confusion with the original title. Its run ended on 12 September 2014.

In October 2009, Ramsay announced that after his four-year contract expired in 2011 he would not continue with Kitchen Nightmares and would instead work on his other shows. Despite this, the show returned for one last series in 2014 (retitled as Ramsay's Costa del Nightmares) where Ramsay visited and helped failing restaurants owned by Britons abroad. The final series also coincided with the ending of the American version after seven seasons (which was later revived for an eighth season in 2023). The show has won BAFTA and Emmy Awards.

== Series overview ==
Series	Episodes	Originally released	
Series	Episodes	First released	Last released
1	4	27 April 2004	18 May 2004
2	8	24 May 2005	12 July 2005
3	4	21 February 2006	14 March 2006
4	6	14 November 2006	19 December 2006
5	8	30 October 2007	18 December 2007
Ramsay's Great British Nightmare	1	30 January 2009	
Ramsay's Costa del Nightmares	4	23 September 2014	14 October 2014

== Episodes ==
=== Series 1 ===
No. overall	No. in series	Restaurant	Location	Original release date
1	1	Bonapartes	Silsden, England	27 April 2004
Ramsay quickly identifies the restaurant as having two major issues; firstly, the fine-dining menu has no appeal to the mostly working-class locals, and secondly the head chef, 21-year-old Tim Gray, is inexperienced, incompetent and out of his depth, first evidenced when he unwittingly serves Ramsay expired scallops which cause him to vomit, and then when he proves unable to make an omelette. The menu is full of expensive ingredients which the restaurant can ill-afford, as the weekly food takings are insufficient to cover the wages of the kitchen staff, let alone other expenses. Ramsay shows Tim how to buy cheaper produce from the Leeds Kirkgate Market and helps him make a meal for his family, though is still concerned when Tim botches even this meal. Despite this, after having revised and simplified the menu, Tim is successfully able to serve a new bistro menu to nearly fifty guests on Valentine's Day, leaving Ramsay hopeful for the restaurant's future. When Ramsay returns for a revisit a month later, he finds the restaurant in an even worse state than when he first arrived; virtually no guests are booked for dinner, and the fridges and pantry are found to be full of rotting, mouldy food (untitled at filming, the series would take its name from Ramsay describing the vile kitchen as a "living fucking nightmare"). Bonapartes' owner, Sue Ray, fires Tim and announces that she will close the restaurant and focus on running the upstairs bar, and Ramsay leaves, admitting failure.
2	2	The Glass House	Ambleside, England	4 May 2004
While Ramsay quickly sees the potential in the restaurant upon his arrival, due to the attractive building, excellent location and strong flow of tourists, he finds the actual food to be poor, which he blames on new owner Neil Farrell's inexperience and panicky nature and head chef Richard Collins' lazy attitude, which hampers an otherwise-talented kitchen staff. Ramsay also finds the kitchen to be in a terrible state, and makes the staff join him in cleaning and repainting it. An initial failure to improve sees Richard come dangerously close to being fired, but he talks Neil into giving him one last chance, and Richard is able to improve and lead the kitchen through a service with a simplified, revamped menu. The following month, Ramsay revisits the restaurant, and is pleased to see that they have further improved their menu and food, and that Neil and Richard are now getting along well.
3	3	The Walnut Tree Inn	Llanddewi Skirrid, Wales	11 May 2004
Before visiting the inn, Ramsay discusses its history and the success it had under former owner Franco Taruschio, which has turned into financial difficulty under current owner Francesco Mattioli, something that has surprised Ramsay, given that the two were already acquainted from Francesco's career as a restaurant manager in London. However, Ramsay soon discovers exactly how bad things are; the restaurant is without a head chef, the food is very expensive and of poor quality (including a seafood stew being full of sand), and the locals have lost interest. Ramsay helps Francesco recruit a new head chef, Spencer Ralph, and create a more reasonably priced menu, before holding a special anniversary dinner to celebrate the inn's 40th anniversary, with Franco in attendance. When he returns for a revisit, Ramsay finds that despite the loss of the restaurant's Michelin Star, the situation has improved somewhat; the food is definitely better, and the inn has more customers, but the prices are still very high. Before leaving, Ramsay reiterates that Francesco has to lower prices if he wants to succeed.
4	4	Moore Place	Esher, England	18 May 2004
Despite the potential offered by the rich locals and the golf course next door to the restaurant, Ramsay finds it wasted by the building's terrible decor (including the exterior being entirely painted a claret shade), and the outdated menu that relies extensively on deep-fried food cooked in ageing, filthy equipment. The inexperience of owners Richard Hodgson and Nick Whitehurst also poses a major problem, as does the seeming indifference of much of the kitchen staff, especially head chef Mark Robinson, whose background is mostly in IT rather than cooking, and is berated by Ramsay for spending time golfing rather than cooking, which eventually leads to Ramsay destroying the kitchen's deep-fat fryers by throwing them into a water hazard on the course. Things begin to turn around when an experienced sous-chef, Andy Trowell, is hired, and Ramsay gives him a burger recipe which he turns into the restaurant's new signature dish and introduces in a successful Mother's Day lunch. Ramsay is dismayed to find that the building still has the same claret paint job when he returns for his revisit, but is otherwise pleased to find that Andy has been promoted to head chef (Mark is mentioned as having left to become a pub landlord), and that the restaurant attracts much more business.

=== Series 2 ===
No. overall	No. in series	Restaurant	Location	Original release date
5	1	La Lanterna	Letchworth, England	24 May 2005
Ramsay meets Executive Chef Alex Scott in the kitchen, where he finds no authentic Italian ingredients, and too many precooked and prepackaged dishes. His meal consists of greasy minestrone soup, breadsticks in a paper package, and sausages on garlic bread that remind him of "two poodles' penises doused in parsley". In the walk-in, Ramsay finds old food, Pot Noodles, and rotten vegetables. Worst of all, the kitchen and floor are filthy, with food debris everywhere (but amazingly, no rats or mice). Despite Alex losing £1,000 per week, Ramsay opens his garage to find a brand new BMW with custom numberplates – "A1 6HEF". Ramsay discovers that Alex had spent £48,000 on the car, and straight away sets off to sell both the car and the numberplate – calling a number of celebrity chefs about the latter, with amusing results. He also introduces Alex to noted chef Francesco Zanchetta, then of Riva in West London. Ramsay teaches Gavin, the ineffectual manager, to be more authoritative – even roleplaying an uncooperative cook, to let Gavin tell him off. Ramsay also has the cooks engage in a pizza contest; which the sous-chef, Aldona Novak, wins. This ignites some passion in her for food, whereas before she had completely lacked it. Ramsay also updates the menu and the decor, bringing in paintings from a local art school. On reopening night, Alex starts to get overwhelmed and takes too long getting food out, but Gavin's newfound assertiveness saves the night. Six weeks later, Ramsay revisits La Lanterna and found that Alex has stuck to the changes – keeping the kitchen clean, serving fresh ingredients, and making homemade ravioli and desserts. Gavin has also continued to be a better manager. Alex is now making £4,000 a week and has been able to pay down £20,000 of debt, enough to start paying himself a salary.
6	2	D-Place	Chelmsford, England	31 May 2005
While his biggest problem is with the restaurant's name, Ramsay finds that rookie owners Israel and Tara Pons are allowing themselves to be steamrollered by general manager Dave Bone, who Ramsay finds confrontational and ineffective, and head chef Philippe Blaise, who is vastly experienced and somewhat talented, but also arrogant and prone to taking shortcuts. Ramsay gets the owners to rename the restaurant as the Saracen's Café Bar, after the hotel which the restaurant is situated in, and creates a better menu with a club sandwich as its centrepiece. While Philippe needs a lot of persuasion (and more than a little yelling) to fully embrace the new menu, Dave's inept handling of the reopening lunch service rapidly causes it to descend into chaos, leaving many guests without food. This causes Israel to finally run out of patience, and he fires Dave on the spot. Ramsay leaves with an uncertain outlook, noting that Israel and Tara are finally toughening up and Philippe's attitude seems a little better, but that it remains to be seen whether the changes will stick. On his return, Ramsay discovers that Israel and Tara have been evicted from the restaurant by the building's owners, a decision they apparently made before Ramsay originally arrived in Chelmsford, and that the two are now in a dire financial situation. The restaurant is now closed and the lease up for sale. In the face of all this, Ramsay is shocked to find that Philippe was hired by the Saracen Hotel to head up their kitchen, and has made the club sandwich into its signature dish. While this definitely was not the outcome Ramsay expected, he is happy to see that Philippe is at least maintaining high standards in his new job.
7	3	Momma Cherri's Soul Food Shack	Brighton, England	7 June 2005
In a break from form, Ramsay declares that the restaurant's food is excellent, and easily the best he has had on the show so far. However, he finds that owner-chef Charita Jones is far too easygoing when managing her staff (such as tolerating lateness and allowing the staff to use the restaurant's facilities off-shift), tends to rely on freezing her food (ruining its flavour) and has made little attempt to promote the restaurant. With Ramsay's help, she adjusts to cooking all her food to order, and manages to pull in more customers. The kitchen staff initially finds it hard to adjust to the hugely increased custom, but soon adapt as the week goes on. In his revisit two months later, Ramsay finds that the restaurant is still a success, Charita is focusing on running the front of house, and is also considering moving to a larger location to expand the potential of her business.
8	4	La Riviera	Inverness, Scotland	14 June 2005
Ramsay has mixed feelings on the restaurant's food, noting that while head chef Loïc Lefebvre's food is technically very proficient, it is over-complicated, not cost-efficient, and would have limited appeal even in London or Edinburgh, to say nothing of Inverness. After helping Loïc and his team gain a better understanding of local culture by taking them to an Inverness Caledonian Thistle match and even getting them to wear kilts for their reopening service, Gordon helps Loïc create a menu that is sophisticated, but also cost-effective and appealing to the locals. When he revisits the restaurant, owned by millionaire Barry Larsen, Ramsay is pleased to see that Loïc has stuck with the new menu, and he is also impressed by a redesign of the restaurant. In a pre-credits caption, it is revealed that the restaurant was renamed Abstract shortly before the episode aired.
9	5	The Glass House Revisited	Ambleside, England	21 June 2005
Revisited episode After recapping the original episode, Ramsay returns to the Glass House for a second time, and is happy to see standards mostly being maintained, though he takes the time to criticise Richard for allowing standards to slip a little in certain areas. Fortunately, Richard quickly corrects this. It is noted that a few members in the kitchen team have changed; in particular, two of them have been hired by Ramsay himself to work at his restaurants.
10	6	The Walnut Tree Revisited	Llandewi Skirrid, Wales	28 June 2005
Revisited episode While the overall standard of food has been broadly maintained as of his second revisit, Ramsay is dismayed to find that the number of customers has dropped to its lowest-ever number, and that Francesco is still charging extremely high prices that, on average, are in excess of £60 for a main course alone. After speaking to the locals and finding out that those who've visited the inn have enjoyed the food but not felt it to be worth the price, Ramsay creates a new dish that can be sold for half the price of the existing items and still be very profitable. However, Francesco is adamant that his approach is correct, and openly says that he would rather see the inn go out of business than make prices as cheap as Ramsay is suggesting. Ramsay gives up, tells Francesco that the inn will close if he maintains his current approach, and leaves.
11	7	Moore Place Revisited	Esher, England	5 July 2005
Revisited episode Ramsay revisits the establishment and is shocked to see that the building has still not been repainted, despite this being one of the primary complaints from the locals. He finds solace in the fact that the positive changes to the menu have appeared to work and Moore Place is seeing better business. He makes a final suggestion to improve the lunch time trade by bringing the bar menu inline with the main restaurant, and pulls a stunt of throwing their deep fat fryer into a pond to prevent them from making cheap deep-fried food for good.
12	8	Bonapartes Revisited	Silsden, England	12 July 2005
Revisited episode As of Ramsay's second revisit, Bonaparte's has closed altogether, and is up for sale. More importantly Ramsay reveals that Sue, who refuses to be interviewed in the episode, has made several allegations about Ramsay and the show through the press (including an accusation that Tim was actually an actor hired by the producers, who duped Sue into believing he was a chef and then deliberately did the worst job possible in order to make the restaurant and Sue look bad) and is considering a lawsuit against both (though she ultimately did not go through with one). Ramsay also catches up with Tim, who has decided to change careers completely and happily pursuing work in television as a runner, though is dismayed to find that, like in the original episode, Tim still can not successfully cook an omelette.

=== Series 3 ===
No. overall	No. in series	Restaurant	Location	Original release date
13	1	Oscar's	Nantwich, England	21 February 2006
Initially, Ramsay deems the restaurant's problem to be its unfocused, over-complicated menu, and Ramsay helps owner Maura Dooris to address this, along with setting up deals with local butchers. However, Ramsay also finds head chef (and Maura's son) Lenin to be alarmingly inconsistent in terms of ability, and on further investigation finds that he has been drinking in service. While Lenin is very competent when sober, his standards slip dramatically when he has been drinking. Ramsay orders Lenin to restrict his drinking to the evenings, but on his next shift he gets a waitress to smuggle alcohol into the kitchen for him, further angering Ramsay. Ramsay manages to get Lenin to stop drinking on the third night by promising to himself give up swearing for that night's service, but events take a serious turn on the fourth night, when Lenin suddenly collapses in service and has to be rushed to hospital, where it is revealed that he is in the early stages of cirrhosis. This leads to Ramsay bringing in former chef and charity founder Michael Quinn to discuss the issue of alcoholism and drug abuse in the industry, and Michael tells Ramsay that 10% of all chefs will encounter substance abuse issues during their careers, and that Lenin must give up his job and enter rehab. In the meantime, Ramsay and sous-chef Les manage a successful service with a new menu focused around Irish cuisine. When Ramsay revisits, he finds that the restaurant has a new head chef, and that Lenin is now only involved to hand over the reins before checking into rehab. More importantly, Lenin's cirrhosis was found to be treatable, and he is expected to make a full recovery. That night, Maura forces a reluctant Ramsay to engage in an Irish folk dance with her.
14	2	The Sandgate Hotel	Sandgate, England	28 February 2006
Upon visiting the Sandgate Hotel, Ramsay is immediately confused with the hotel's layout. There is a bar, a restaurant, and even a Japanese restaurant downstairs, all run from the same kitchen. To further complicate the experience, each has its own menu and diners cannot order from one menu without going to the other restaurant. Ramsay finds Stuart White, a gentle Geordie, in charge of the kitchen alongside his young inexperienced assistants. Ramsay identifies numerous issues: Stuart is clearly not comfortable cooking the bizarre range of food and has no experience in cooking Japanese food; he must leave the kitchen to his junior chefs while he runs the balcony grill; the orders are sent through an intercom system that disrupts the kitchen; the hotel staff spend too much time and money at their own bar (and in fact are inadvertently keeping the hotel afloat); and the number of managers causes confusion over who is in charge. Furthermore, during the week Stuart loses his AA rosette, severely demoralising him. Despite these problems, Ramsay manages to set the restaurant on the right path by turning the Japanese restaurant into an exclusive dining area, focusing the menu on fresh seafood, and establishing more control over the front of house with owner Lois as the host. Ramsay returns to find that turnover has doubled and while Stuart had not yet regained his AA rosette, he was relieved to find his morale and passion had improved.
15	3	Clubway 41	Blackpool, England	7 March 2006
Clubway 41 is run by Dave Jackson and his girlfriend Dawn Brindley, and is heavily promoted on the back of being named Blackpool Restaurant of the Year, but is struggling to attract customers. Ramsay finds that the upstairs restaurant is being kept afloat by the downstairs greasy spoon café. Dave's salmon with strawberry and mash with nectarines are appalling to Ramsay. Dave has difficulty taking criticism from Ramsay and shows little proficiency for cooking, and even less familiarity with managing a kitchen, even with the downstairs cook Nigel Lloyd, who was more capable in handling the rush. Digging deeper, Ramsay discovers that no locals have heard of the award-winning Clubway 41 and obtains copies of the nomination forms, finding the reviews to be almost farcical. Identifying the difficulty with attracting customers to an upstairs restaurant, he takes a risk and turns the downstairs café into the main attraction, focusing on simple English food. In the reopening, the restaurant is renamed Jacksons. With Dave and Nigel in the kitchen, the service begins well, and while Nigel is a capable assistant, Dave continues to struggle with handling the workload. When Ramsay revisits, he finds a significant turn of events. A new bus stop was built in front of the restaurant, deterring customers from coming in. Nigel has left, leaving Dave in the kitchen, and the restaurant has reverted to its previous greasy spoon fare. Ramsay brings the owners out to Blackpool to do heavy promoting and places ads on the buses to help bring customers back.
16	4	La Gondola	Derby, England	14 March 2006
Daniela Bayfield has invested in a 40-year-old establishment and is hesitant to modernise, and relies on functions to sustain the restaurant rather than a steady customer base. Ramsay states that the restaurant is stuck in a time warp, with dishes reminiscent of the 70s, 80s and early 90s, retaining silver service long outdated, and the dishes are severely underpriced, making a loss per sale. Head chef Steve Straughan lacks passion and is unused to busy sessions. During a birthday function, the kitchen uses canned tuna to substitute for tuna steaks, uses bought-in apple pie instead of making it, and mixes freshly made minestrone soup with packet soup to save costs. Steve and his excessive, dim-witted staff struggle to maintain order in the kitchen during service without a clear system. Ramsay discards the complicated menu and devises a new, simpler menu and changes the decor in the dining room. He also brings back the flambé table service as a hallmark of the restaurant. The dinner service proceeds well, though Steve still has difficulty communicating with the team. When Ramsay revisits, he discovers that Steve has moved on and Daniela has gone through several chefs before hiring a new one.

=== Series 4 ===
No. overall	No. in series	Restaurant	Location	Original release date
17	1	La Parra de Burriana	Nerja, Spain	14 November 2006
Laurence Davy runs a restaurant in an ideal Spanish holiday location, but has difficulty attracting locals. Ramsay discovers a menu that encompasses numerous cuisines and appalling recipes, such as prawns with chocolate sauce and chicken with banana. Poor service and improperly cooked food have given the restaurant a negative reputation, especially after Laurence's bizarre recipes and arrogant attitude alienated a donkey sanctuary. To show the staff the importance of letting ingredients speak for themselves, he creates smoothies from the menu items, including the prawns with chocolate, with Lawrence being unable to identify the prawns. Ramsay creates a simple menu for the night's service, but Lawrence insists that he is in control of his large, unpopular menu and only switches to Ramsay's backup menu after it is too late. To make things worse, the restaurant is robbed during the night, with the thieves taking money from the takings stored in a filing cabinets. Ramsay takes Laurence to a bullfighting school to demonstrate the importance of listening to expert advice. He also berates Laurence over his excessive use of his plancha grill, causing food to be overcooked and taste monotonous, and teaches him to cook fresh food in pans. The final service begins well, but the staff have double-booked tables, causing confusion in the kitchen and ruining an otherwise nearly flawless reopening. Ramsay leaves, concerned that the restaurant would not make it through the slower winter season. When Ramsay revisits, he finds that the restaurant is doing well, and Laurence has ceased using the grill. The kitchen staff have been moved around to more suitable roles, and Laurence has found a new passion for cooking.
18	2	The Fenwick Arms	Claughton, England	21 November 2006
The Fenwick Arms is a classic English pub, but Ramsay finds the menu is anything but classic English pub grub, with many dishes ruined by sloppy sauces created by owner and head chef, Brian Rey. At 62 years of age, Brian (and his wife, Elaine Howden) are working between 100 and 120 hours a week and his age and health create disorder in kitchen as he is unable to keep track of orders. Ramsay also finds that Brian is a compulsive hoarder, collecting a bizarre collection of crockery from eBay. To address the problems, Ramsay removes Brian from the kitchen and moves him to the front of house. However, Brian is unable to fully remove himself from his duties and creates another batch of terrible sauce. Ramsay throws the sauce away and gets Brian to begin selling his excessive plate collection. He turns Brian over to a simpler menu, focusing on classic pub dishes instead of pretending to be a restaurant, and to complement the excellent Yorkshire pudding, Ramsay creates a new focus and campaign for the pub to bring back real gravy. Brian is enthusiastic about the idea and the staff market their new gravy in town. Despite some confusion in the service, the kitchen staff hold up under pressure and the customers are pleased with the new food. Ramsay leaves after making Brian promise not to step back into the kitchen. During his revisit, Ramsay is shocked to learn that Brian has returned to the kitchen. The kitchen staff have been left shorthanded and he is filling in until they can employ a new chef, and subsequently he has begun reverting to some of his old habits. While Ramsay is impressed with the roast beef and gravy, he is still unimpressed with the plates and the presentation of prawn cocktail in scallop shells.
19	3	Rococo	King's Lynn, England	28 November 2006
Despite having been a successful chef in the previous decade, owner and chef Nick Anderson has fallen on hard times due to his refusal to modernise his menu or cooking methods, which Ramsay attributes to the way he was abruptly fired from a hotel shortly after earning it a Michelin Star in 1997. After speaking to the locals and finding out about the Rococo's abysmal reputation, Ramsay tells Nick that there's no way he can salvage things as they are, and that the only way to recover is to effectively start over with a new restaurant in the same building. Nick agrees, and Rococo is renamed Maggie's, given a complete makeover and refit, and a new menu focused around local seafood. When he revisits, Ramsay is happy to find that Nick has embraced the restaurant's new identity, and has finally shaken off his ghosts of the past.
20	4	Morgans	Liverpool, England	5 December 2006
Ramsay has major issues with the food, but finds the biggest problem to be the feuds among the owners and staff; owner Sandy Morgan has little knowledge of restaurants and insists on personally buying all the ingredients from a nearby supermarket rather than appropriate business supplier. Her younger daughter Laura Kelly has even less business knowledge. Elder daughter Helen Kelly has more, but works elsewhere and therefore only works at the restaurant part-time. Head chef Philip Lee has a confrontational attitude, uses bizarre combinations (such as mashed potatoes and apricot) in the menu and does not get on with sous-chef Emma, who nonetheless serves Ramsay the only thing he likes, a sticky toffee pudding. Ramsay finds it hard going, and the continued feuds cause Laura to temporarily walk away from the restaurant, but with Helen committing to the restaurant full-time and Phil agreeing to work more with Emma and simplifying the menu, things begin to look up. When he revisits, Ramsay finds the restaurant running much better, thanks to Helen handling the business aspects and Sandy focusing on hospitality. Most significantly, a week after Ramsay left, Sandy promoted Emma to head chef and gave Phil an ultimatum to accept demotion to sous-chef or be fired; he resigned. Ramsay visits Phil at his new job at a restaurant on the Albert Dock, though there are no hard feelings between the two.
21	5	La Riviera Revisited	Inverness, Scotland	12 December 2006
Revisited episode Restaurant is now called Abstract.
22	6	Momma Cherri's Soul Food Shack Revisited	Brighton, England	19 December 2006
Revisited episode The restaurant, now extremely popular, has moved to larger premises and been renamed Momma Cherri's Big House. In part to cope with the massively increased custom, Charita is beginning to revert to her old ways; however after Ramsay's coaching is able to adapt to larger-scale catering without sacrificing quality.

=== Series 5 ===
No. overall	No. in series	Restaurant	Location	Original release date
23	1	Ruby Tates	Brighton, England	30 October 2007
On his arrival, Ramsay finds that owner and former actor Allan Love is in a fragile emotional state due to the precarious nature of the business and the possibility of losing his house. Allan's restaurant specialises in fish, which he dislikes, and his two chefs, Jamie and Alex, are lazy and seemingly only interested in the money. Ramsay realises that the restaurant's fish is too expensive and sub-standard. On taking Alex and Jamie to a local fish market, Ramsay finds that pollock is in plentiful local supply and revises the menu, adding a pollock fish and chips meal which proves popular. Ramsay clashes with Allan over the restaurant's gaudy decor, which Allan is proud of and initially threatens to stop filming if Ramsay attempts to change it. Allan eventually agrees to allow a makeover, and Ramsay also has the restaurant renamed Love's Fish Restaurant so as to take advantage of its biggest asset, Allan himself. Jamie is designated head chef, and the full reopening proves a big hit. Two months later, Ramsay returns to Brighton and covertly orders a takeaway, under the name of "Jimmy", in a Scottish accent. When he arrives at the restaurant he finds that it is still a big success, and that Alex was fired two days after Ramsay originally left, after he showed up late to work and openly disrespected Allan. After Gordon and Allan enjoy fish and chips on the beach, Allan sings the episode out by performing "My Way".
24	2	Piccolo Teatro	Paris, France	6 November 2007
Ramsay is simultaneously delighted to be working in Paris, the city where he originally learned to be a chef, and a little daunted at the prospect of taking on a vegetarian restaurant. By the end of the first night, he forces owner Rachel McNally to fire her lazy, incompetent head chef Daniel (whom Ramsay has to physically eject from the premises when he refuses to leave). Rachel's friend, waitress Stephanie, quits a day later after Ramsay criticises her attitude. Ramsay dislikes the dull, health-conscious fare, pointing out that people come to Paris to indulge themselves. He demonstrates by taking the staff out to eat, followed by an evening's drinking in bars, and finally to a burlesque performance; inspired, he and the staff jointly devise a vegetarian but still very luxurious chocolate dessert. Ramsay proceeds to prove the restaurant's potential by opening it himself for lunch, something Rachel has never done, and makes over €400 from a simple meal of tomato soup and grilled cheese-on-toast. Backup then arrives in the form of Rachel's father Brian and promising young chef India Innes, and despite a brief delay caused by Rachel forgetting to buy supplies, a strong relaunch service seemingly has the restaurant set up for success. When Gordon returns for his revisit, however, he finds that the restaurant has closed. Rachel gave up and quit just a few weeks after Ramsay left, and is completely unapologetic when Ramsay catches up with her, leading Ramsay to furiously berate her for letting down Brian and India (who tried to carry on alone after she left, to no avail). He finally accuses Rachel of being the single worst owner he has ever dealt with on the show, causing her to storm out of the restaurant. The episode ends on a positive note however, as Ramsay sees enough potential in India to hire her to work at his Boxwood restaurant.
25	3	The Fenwick Arms Revisited	Claughton, England	13 November 2007
Revisited episode
26	4	La Parra Revisited	Nerja, Spain	20 November 2007
Revisited episode Though Ramsay is initially pleased to see that the restaurant still has good visitor numbers, and that former grill chef Norm is no longer working there, Ramsay soon becomes concerned when he finds that the menu has expanded again, now including various overcooked and tasteless pasta dishes. In an attempt to persuade Laurence to revert to solely using local produce, Ramsay sets up a cook-off on the beach between his seafood paella and Laurence's pasta, with the paella easily winning among the beach-goers. While Laurence eventually agrees to remove the pasta dishes from his menu, Ramsay is no longer as optimistic about the restaurant's future as he was during his initial revisit, and is worried that Laurence will soon lose focus again.
27	5	The Priory	Haywards Heath, England	27 November 2007
Despite enjoying perhaps more customers than any other restaurant seen to date on the show, new owner Scott Aitchison reveals that The Priory is losing money because almost all the business is from people using "50% off" vouchers on the restaurant's carvery - customers are in effect paying only £5 for a full meal, less than the value of the ingredients in the carvery, causing the restaurant to take a significant loss on almost every sale. Ramsay also strongly criticises the work ethic and competence of head chef Toby, and is infuriated to discover the kitchen is full of old food and filthy, rusting equipment, which he orders to be replaced. However, Ramsay suspects that the kitchen staff are merely demotivated due to the unchanging menu. He sets up a new grill menu, but Toby is even worse at cooking that than the carvery. Ramsay orders the restaurant's general manager Matt, himself an experienced chef, to take over from Toby, who is demoted to sous-chef. This change in roles finally gets things moving, and under Matt's leadership the kitchen finally gets through a service. In the revisit, Matt is still heading up the kitchen and Toby has been fired for serving expired chicken. Scott has refused to fully commit to the new menu, and is only running it on weekdays, with the carvery still running at weekends, so Ramsay has Scott and the staff run an advertising campaign for the new menu in the town centre.
28	6	The Fish and Anchor	Lampeter, Wales	4 December 2007
Run by former Italian boxer Mike Ciminera, The Fish and Anchor is a local eatery filled with sports memorabilia and with a tarnished reputation, with Mike and wife Caron notorious for their feuding, which has scared customers away. Mike, while passionate and ambitious, is not a trained chef and has based his menu on cookbooks written by celebrity chefs such as Jamie Oliver, Rick Stein and Gordon Ramsay himself. Ramsay is critical of the menu's complexity and lack of focus, and his concerns are proven in the evening service. As the cookbooks are written for home cooking, the dishes are too complex to manage in a busy restaurant environment, and Mike does not know how to handle multiple orders. Half the customers are not served food, and Caron verbally confronts and kicks out several customers. The next day, Ramsay gets rid of Mike's cookbooks and removes the exotic dishes from the menu. He appeals to Mike's proud Italian heritage and creates an authentic meatball item. Mike is capable of handling the orders in the following service with praise for the food, but the night is ruined when Caron forgets an order and throws a tantrum. Ramsay manages to help the couple ease the tension and work together. They go into town to promote their new menu and service. Before the service, Ramsay sets up a punching bag outside to get the couple to vent their anger. The restaurant is packed, and Caron proves to have overcome her temper issues. However, Mike's inexperience in managing a full dining room causes him to fall behind. The service is stopped when one of the waitresses slips and falls, being knocked unconscious and taken to hospital. When Ramsay revisits, Mike has changed the ugly blue paint to a pleasing white. Business has doubled and Caron and Mike no longer argue. To verify this, Ramsay calls up recent customers, who confirm their positive experience. He parts ways with the couple and gifts them with their own empty cookbook, telling Mike to fill it with his own recipes.
29	7	Curry Lounge	Nottingham, England	11 December 2007
Ramsay is initially displeased with the restaurant's atmosphere and misleading claims of being Nottingham's best restaurant (with "Runners-Up" in small print). Owner Arfan "Raz" Razak proudly boasts that his "make your own curry" idea is what sets his restaurant apart, but Ramsay tells him that it is actually ensuring the business will fail. The kitchen staff have to buy huge quantities of ingredients to make all the curries on the menu, none of them taste nice, and not even the restaurant staff can taste the difference between them. At Ramsay's urging, head chef Khan puts a lamb korma made from a family recipe on the menu for the second night's service, which proves a big hit and wins Raz over. Ramsay sells Raz on the idea of making curry deliveries to offices in the city centre. With a fully revamped menu based on regional flavours, the reopening night is a big hit. Subsequently, the restaurant enjoys such success that when Ramsay revisits, he can not even find a seat. He does however take issue with the ugly naan bread stands that Raz has been using throughout the episode, to the point where at the end, he takes them to a scrap metal dealer to be destroyed.
30	8	The Granary	Fareham, England	18 December 2007
The Granary is run by ambitious entrepreneur Nigel Nieddu. Originally intended as an exclusive club for the rich and famous, Nigel has had to rebrand the restaurant, which now struggles to pull customers and has a poor reputation with the locals for its exclusive impression. Ramsay and Nigel eat lunch together, where it becomes clear that the restaurant does not live up to its focus of modern British food, with too many exotic dishes on the menu (such as shark with mozzarella) that the kitchen staff struggle to cook. The kitchen is run by Martin, who has taken on board two delinquent teenage boys to help them back on track with cooking. Ramsay books the restaurant to half capacity for lunch to test the kitchen, but unused to even these numbers, the staff struggle to keep up. Ramsay identifies that Nigel, who has no experience as a restaurant manager, lacks control over the dining room and has difficulty accepting criticism. Nigel even struggles to delegate tasks to his staff when challenged to put together a prefabricated chicken coop. After convincing Nigel to turn to a simpler British menu and allowing Martin to have more control, the staff host a food fair to bring the community back. The reopening begins well, but Martin struggles with the numbers and fails to show strong leadership under pressure. The kitchen staff lose discipline, although young cook Pete is able to hold himself together. The service is disappointing, with Martin disappointed with himself and Nigel determined to get it right. Revisiting the restaurant, Ramsay is pleased to find the restaurant is maintaining a steady flow of customers. Martin reveals that he is leaving, after applying for a government grant to set up a workshop to help troubled teenagers through cooking.

=== Ramsay's Great British Nightmare ===
A one-off, two-hour special entitled Ramsay's Great British Nightmare was broadcast on 30 January 2009 as part of The Great British Food Fight, a two-week series of food-related programming on Channel 4. In the programme, Ramsay campaigned for viewers to start supporting local restaurants, especially in a bad economy.

No. overall	No. in series	Restaurant	Location	Original release date
31	1	The Dovecote Bistro & The Runaway Girl	Devon, England; Sheffield, England	30 January 2009
The Dovecote Bistro (renamed Martins' Bistro) Mick is a former trucker and burger van operator who has opened a bistro with his wife, Mo, and adopted daughter, Michelle. Ramsay is firstly appalled by the psychedelic wallpaper, but impressed with the simple menu. Mick, however, has very little cooking ability, using orange squash to make a sauce and microwaving unrefrigerated, vacuum-sealed pre-cooked lamb shanks. Not only does he show little responsibility in the kitchen, he is also secretive with his spending and is hugely in debt. Mick is adamant that the problems in the kitchen are not his fault, and his stubbornness causes a rift with his wife and daughter. Ramsay takes the business matters out of Mick's hands, kicking him out of the kitchen. His daughter, Michelle, is placed in charge of the kitchen, despite having no cooking experience. She rises to the challenge, and while Mick is not convinced over replacing his microwave food, the reopening is a success. Months later, the restaurant is making profit. Ramsay sends Michelle for further culinary training, and she impresses him with freshly cooked food. The restaurant was renamed Martins' Bistro during production. The Runaway Girl (renamed Silversmiths) Justin runs The Runaway Girl, specialising in Spanish tapas, with best friend and head chef, Richie. Ramsay finds the name and appearance of the restaurant to be similar to a strip club. The kitchen does no preparation work before service, as Justin has had Richie pre-cook all the meals in advance to prevent wastage. Justin invests very little in the kitchen and focuses on organising live music events, which customers find loud and obnoxious. Richie launches a heated tirade about Justin's inability to listen to criticism, threatening to resign if the restaurant does not immediately improve. Ramsay employs a mystery diner to assess the service, and despite Justin claiming to recognise their purpose, botches the service and forgets to even provide cutlery, resulting in a scathing review. After helping Justin and Richie make amends, he refurbishes the restaurant and renames it Silversmiths, bans live music and, realising that they have no chance of competing against local Spanish restaurants, changes the focus to modern British cuisine. Before Ramsay's revisit, he sends another mystery diner to the restaurant, who gives a positive assessment of the service. Justin has stuck to the changes, and Richie has found a new passion for food.

=== Ramsay's Costa del Nightmares ===
No. overall	No. in series	Restaurant	Location	Original release date
32	1	Mayfair Restaurante	Fuengirola, Spain	23 September 2014
While previously successful, the Mayfair has fallen on hard times, which Ramsay attributes to owner Jack's refusal to fire head chef Juan, awful hygiene standards (which results in Ramsay closing the restaurant down for the first day for an extensive cleaning), and insistence on filling much of the restaurant with useless junk. Ramsay initially sees Jack's son John as the right man to take over, but quickly loses faith upon discovering that the car hire business that John runs separately is failing, and that he has invested €40,000 of his parents' money into it. After forcing John to promise to shut down his hire business and repay his parents, and getting Jack to get rid of his hoard, Ramsay renames the restaurant Jack's Chicken Shack and creates a new menu focused around fried chicken. The service that follows initially goes poorly thanks to John's poor handling of the order system, but he eventually gets the hang of it, and service is successfully completed. In his revisit, Ramsay is encouraged to find that the restaurant is still busy, Juan has been moved to barkeeping duties and replaced by a younger chef (also called Juan), and cleanliness standards have been maintained. However, he makes John write an IOU to his parents when he reveals that he has not paid them back any money yet.
33	2	Le Deck	Capbreton, France	30 September 2014
As soon as he arrives at the restaurant, Ramsay is outraged by head chef Steve and the staff cooking themselves a dinner of sirloin steak belonging to the restaurant, and accuses them of taking advantage of owners Tim and Debbie. However, Tim is discovered to be a big part of the problem due to his interference in service, refusal to allow Steve to set his own menu, and careless handling of the business side of the restaurant. Ramsay has further criticism for Steve's lack of local product knowledge and not even being able to speak French. However, he and the kitchen staff cook good dishes after Ramsay takes them to a local seafood market, only for Tim accuse the staff of laziness upon seeing the results, even threatening to fire them. Despite this, the reopening night goes well, and Ramsay tells Tim that so long as he does not interfere with the running of the kitchen, he can make Le Deck a success. No revisit is shown in the episode, though an epilogue caption reveals that the restaurant is still doing well, while Steve has left and returned to the mountain resort where he previously worked, leaving sous-chef Stuey to take over as head chef.
34	3	La Granada Divino	Gaucín, Spain	7 October 2014
In a Kitchen Nightmares first, Ramsay works with a restaurant that has opened only 8 weeks prior to his arrival. Owners Milan and Gina are new to the restaurant industry, and their inexperience leads them to lean on head chef Neal to manage the restaurant as well as run the kitchen, putting heavy pressure on Neal. The restaurant's menu is too complicated for a small brigade and Neal fails to delegate to his assistant chefs, which slows down service and causes Neal to be extremely stressed while cooking. In order to demonstrate the difficulty that Neal and the servers are under, Ramsay has Milan and Gina work a service with only six guests to demonstrate the negative impact of decisions they had made, like the broken dumbwaiter and the complicated menu. He also implements a new menu based around sharing plates to take pressure off the kitchen. During the relaunch, the service initially starts off strongly. However, when the sharing plates run out, Neal reverts to his bad habits. Ramsay is able to get Neal back on track, saving the service and impressing a local food critic. No revisit is shown in the episode, but it is said that the restaurant is taking in £5,000 a week, Neal and Emily are managing the restaurant, and the owners have taken a step back.
35	4	Quelcuttis	Els Poblets, Spain	14 October 2014
Initially, siblings Joe and Terry Quelcutti seem to be more interested in running the establishment as a bar rather than a restaurant, which has caused chef Terry's food to be abysmal. However, Ramsay identifies a bigger problem: server Joe's inability to keep cool during service leads him to regularly confront guests he is meant to be serving. In order to improve the siblings' abilities in the front and back of house, Ramsay has them work a lunch service at Quique De Costa, a Michelin-starred restaurant in the area. Ramsay relaunches the restaurant as Quelcutti's Tapas with a menu focused on Spanish tapas and quality wine. During service, Joe's panicky nature initially causes him to take too many food orders and get short with Ramsay; fortunately, Joe is able to regain his rhythm and the service ends well. Upon revisit, Ramsay returns to find the restaurant is making money, and the siblings are finally able to pay themselves a wage.

== Libel ==
In June 2006, Ramsay won a High Court case against the Evening Standard, which had alleged that scenes and the general condition of the restaurant had been faked for the first episode of Ramsay's Kitchen Nightmares. These allegations followed reports from the previous owner of Bonapartes, Sue Ray. Ramsay was awarded £75,000 plus costs. Ramsay said at the time: "I won't let people write anything they want to about me. We have never done anything in a cynical, fake way."

== Reception ==
The programme received favourable reviews for its in-depth look into the restaurant industry. Jane Redfem of Off the Telly commented that the show "could have been cynically designed to exploit Ramsay's foul-mouthed reputation... But watch, listen and think about what he is saying, and his genuine commitment to his profession in general, and the task at hand become abundantly evident." Lorna Martin of The Observer said "Ramsay's Kitchen Nightmares is compulsive viewing – packed with excitement, emotion and entertainment." Slate's Sara Dickerman was impressed by the show's "economic realism" in the tired food television genre. She wrote, "There is something refreshing about a show that doesn't promise a ticket to ride (a surgical makeover, a million dollars, Richard Branson's job) but instead offers restaurant owners the hope—if they seriously reform their establishments—that they might, just might, break even for the next few months."

Ramsay's Kitchen Nightmares was named Best Feature at the 2005 and 2008 BAFTA awards. It also earned the 2006 International Emmy for best non-scripted entertainment.

== DVD releases ==
=== United States ===
On 3 March 2009, Acorn Media released series 1 of Ramsay's Kitchen Nightmares on DVD in the US. Series 2 was released on 1 September 2009.

Name	Ep#	Release date
Season One	8	3 March 2009
Season Two	10	1 September 2009

=== Canada ===
For the Canadian market, Visual Entertainment has released the first three series of Ramsay's Kitchen Nightmares on DVD in two volume sets.

Name	Ep#	Release date
Volume 1	8	16 October 2007
Volume 2	10	7 October 2008

== International versions ==
Currently airing
New season coming
No longer in production

Country	Title	Broadcaster	Chef	Original run		Source(s)
Country	Title	Broadcaster	Chef	Start date	End date	Source(s)
Argentina	Pesadilla en la cocina (Nightmare in the kitchen)	Telefe	Christophe Krywonis	Q3 2016		
Australia	Kitchen Nightmares	Seven Network	Colin Fassnidge	12 October 2022		
Brazil	Pesadelo na Cozinha (Nightmare in the kitchen)	Band	Érick Jacquin	26 January 2017	Present	
Bulgaria	Кошмари в кухнята (Nightmares in the kitchen)	Nova TV	Ivan Manchev	8 October 2014	17 January 2022	
Chile	Pesadilla en la cocina (Nightmare in the kitchen)	Chilevisión	Gustavo Maurelli	28 February 2016	27 April 2016	
Croatia	Jezikova juha	RTL	Stephan Macchi	15 May 2009	24 September 2014	
Czech Republic	Ano, šéfe! (Yes, Chef!)	Prima	Zdeněk Pohlreich	5 March 2009	1 October 2018	
Czech Republic	Ano, šéfe! (Yes, Chef!)	Prima	Zdeněk Pohlreich	28 August 2025		
Czech Republic	Ano, šéfová! (Yes, Chef!)	Prima	Jitka and Santo Pagana	12 November 2018	17 December 2018	
Denmark	Med kniven for struben (The knife against the throat)	TV3	Bo Bech (seasons 1–4) Thomas Castberg (seasons 5–present)	2007	2012	
Denmark	Med kniven for struben (The knife against the throat)	Viaplay	Bo Bech (seasons 1–4) Thomas Castberg (seasons 5–present)	2017	2018	
Denmark	Med kniven for struben (The knife against the throat)	Viafree	Bo Bech (seasons 1–4) Thomas Castberg (seasons 5–present)	2020	Present	
Estonia	Köögikubjas (Kitchen Hood)	Kanal 2	Juha Matti Rantanen	2011	2012	
Finland	Kuppilat kuntoon, Jyrki Sukula! (Restoring Restaurants, Jyrki Sukula!)	Nelonen	Jyrki Sukula	2012	2018	
Finland	Kuppilat kuntoon, Hans Välimäki! (Restoring Restaurants, Hans Välimäki!)	Nelonen	Hans Välimäki	2020	Present	
France	Cauchemar en cuisine (Nightmare in the kitchen)	M6	Philippe Etchebest	2011	Present	
Germany	Rach, der Restauranttester (Rach, the Restaurant Tester)	RTL	Christian Rach	11 September 2005	4 March 2013	
Germany	Rach, der Restauranttester (Rach, the Restaurant Tester)	RTL	Christian Rach	13 March 2017	10 April 2017	
Germany	Der Restauranttester (The Restaurant Tester)	RTL	Steffen Henssler	24 February 2014	6 July 2015	
Germany	Rosins Restaurants	Kabel Eins	Frank Rosin	24. November 2009	Present	
Greece	Εφιάλτης στην Κουζίνα (Nightmare in the Kitchen)	Alpha TV	Ektoras Botrini	2009	2013	
Greece	Εφιάλτης στην Κουζίνα (Nightmare in the Kitchen)	Alpha TV	Ektoras Botrini	2020	Present	
Israel	מהפכה במטבח (A kitchen revolution)	Reshet	Asaf Granit	2015	Present	
Italy	Cucine da incubo (Nightmarish kitchens)	Fox Life	Antonino Cannavacciuolo	15 May 2013	Present	
Italy	Cucine da incubo (Nightmarish kitchens)	TV8	Antonino Cannavacciuolo	15 May 2013	Present	
Italy	Cucine da incubo (Nightmarish kitchens)	NOVE	Antonino Cannavacciuolo	15 May 2013	Present	
Italy	Cucine da incubo (Nightmarish kitchens)	Sky Uno	Antonino Cannavacciuolo	15 May 2013	Present	
Netherlands	Herrie in de keuken! (Noise in the kitchen!)	RTL 5 RTL 4	Herman den Blijker	2005	2013	
Norway	Hellstrøm Rydder Opp (Hellstrøm Cleans Up)	TV3; Viasat	Eyvind Hellstrøm	25 September 2008	Present	
Poland	Kuchenne rewolucje (Kitchen revolutions)	TVN	Magda Gessler	6 March 2010	Present	
Portugal	Pesadelo na Cozinha (Nightmare in the kitchen)	TVI	Ljubomir Stanisic	12 March 2017	Present	
Romania	Pe muchie de cuțit (On the edge of a knife)	Pro TV	Paul "Pescobar" Nicolau	2027		
Russia	На ножах (On the Knives); Na nozhakh	Friday!	Konstantin Ivlev	June 15, 2016	Present	
Serbia	Paklena kuhinja (Hell's Kitchen)	Prva Srpska Televizija	Saša Mišić	2010	2013	
Slovakia	Áno, šéfe! (Yes, Chef!)	TV JOJ	Jaroslav Žídek	7 March 2011	20 October 2011	
Slovakia	Na nože (On the Knives)	TV Markíza	Martin Novák	8 February 2023	Present	
Spain	Pesadilla en la cocina (Nightmare in the kitchen)	laSexta	Alberto Chicote	25 October 2012	Present	
Sweden	Kniven mot strupen (The knife against the throat)	TV3	Alexander Nilson	19 November 2009	Present	
Switzerland	Bumann, der Restauranttester (Bumann, the Restaurant Tester)	3+	Daniel Bumann	15 October 2009	2021	
Ukraine	На ножах (On the Knives); Na nozhakh	1+1	Aram Mnatsakanov (season 1); Olga Freimut and Dmitry Borisov (seasons 2-3)	15 August 2012	31 October 2012	
Ukraine	На ножах (On the Knives); Na nozhakh	1+1	Aram Mnatsakanov (season 1); Olga Freimut and Dmitry Borisov (seasons 2-3)	5 April 2016	2 April 2017	
Ukraine	На ножах (On the Knives); Na nozhakh	Novyi Kanal	Alexander Yakutov	15 October 2022		
United States	Kitchen Nightmares	Fox	Gordon Ramsay	19 September 2007	12 September 2014	
United States	Kitchen Nightmares	Fox	Gordon Ramsay	25 September 2023	Present	
