= Barry Larsen =

Scottish multi-millionaire businessman (1956–2023)

- Born: 19 December 1956
- Died: 11 June 2023 (aged 66)
- Occupation: multi-millionaire businessman

Barry Walter Larsen (19 December 1956 – 11 June 2023) was a Scottish multi-millionaire businessman. He once owned almost all of the Wimpy restaurant franchises in Scotland.

== Early life ==
Larsen was born to Walter and Elsie. He grew up in Inverness, Scotland, and attended Balloch Primary School and Inverness High School.

== Career ==
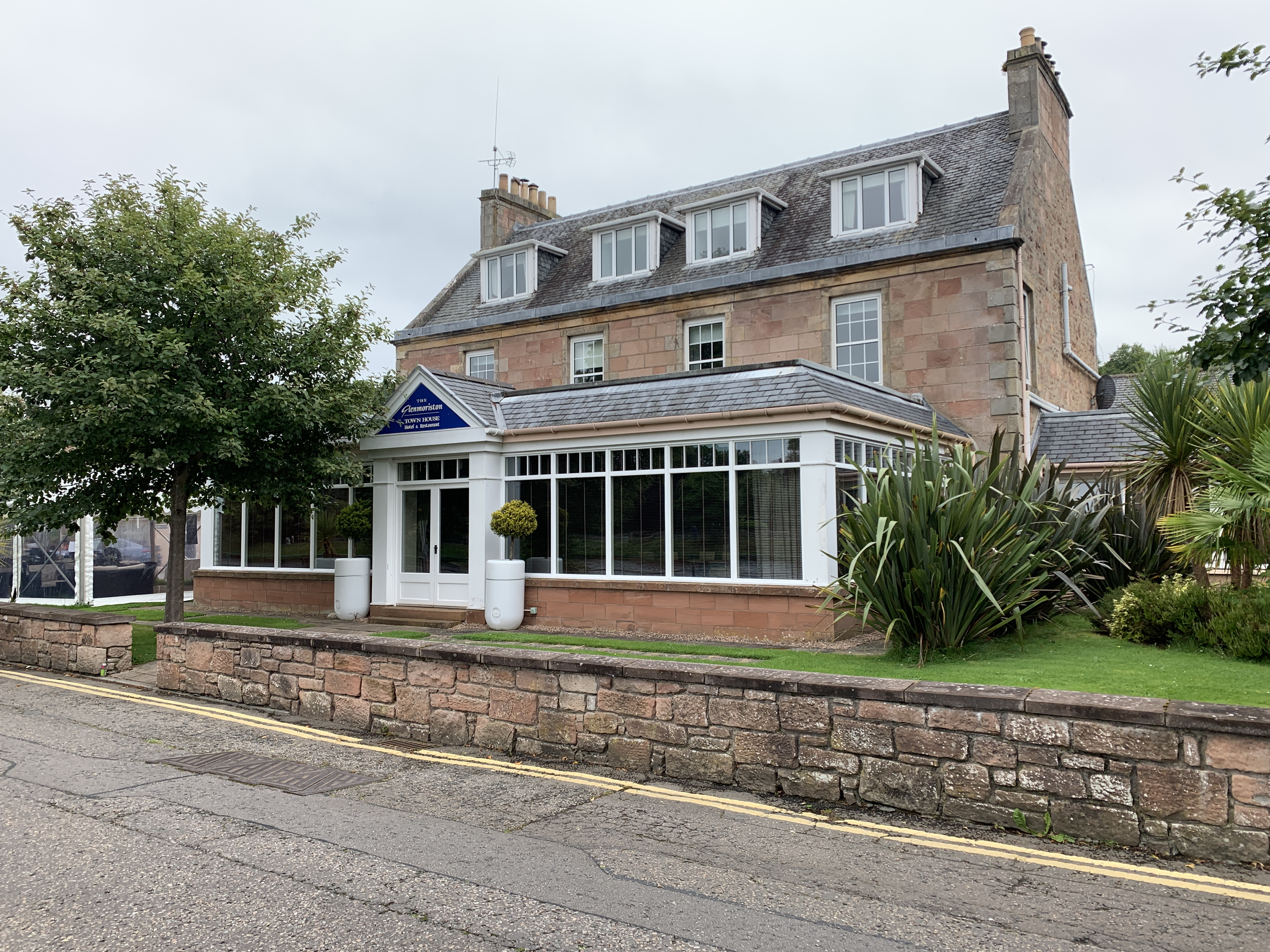
The Glenmoriston in 2020

Larsen gave Michelin-starred French chef and restaurateur Loïc Lefebvre his first head-chef position, at La Riviera, a restaurant at the Glenmoriston Town House Hotel in Inverness. Larsen changed La Riviera's name to Abstract, before opening a second restaurant, named Contrast, next door in June 2006.

In March 2007, after three years in Inverness, Lefebvre moved to Edinburgh, where he and Larsen had planned to open a second location under the Abstract name. After a disagreement, Lefebvre returned to France in May 2007. The second location closed on 31 December 2009.

La Riviera/Abstract was featured in a Ramsay's Kitchen Nightmares episode which aired in June 2005. Gordon Ramsay and his team visited the restaurant the previous winter. The show revisited the restaurant twice: once two months after the original; then again two years later. After the visits, the restaurant won the Scottish Hotel Restaurant of the Year award.

== Personal life ==
Larsen was married to Hilary. They lived on Larsen's estate in Newmore, Muir of Ord.

== Death ==
Larsen died in 2023, aged 66.
