= King's Lynn Crown Court =

Judicial building in King's Lynn, England

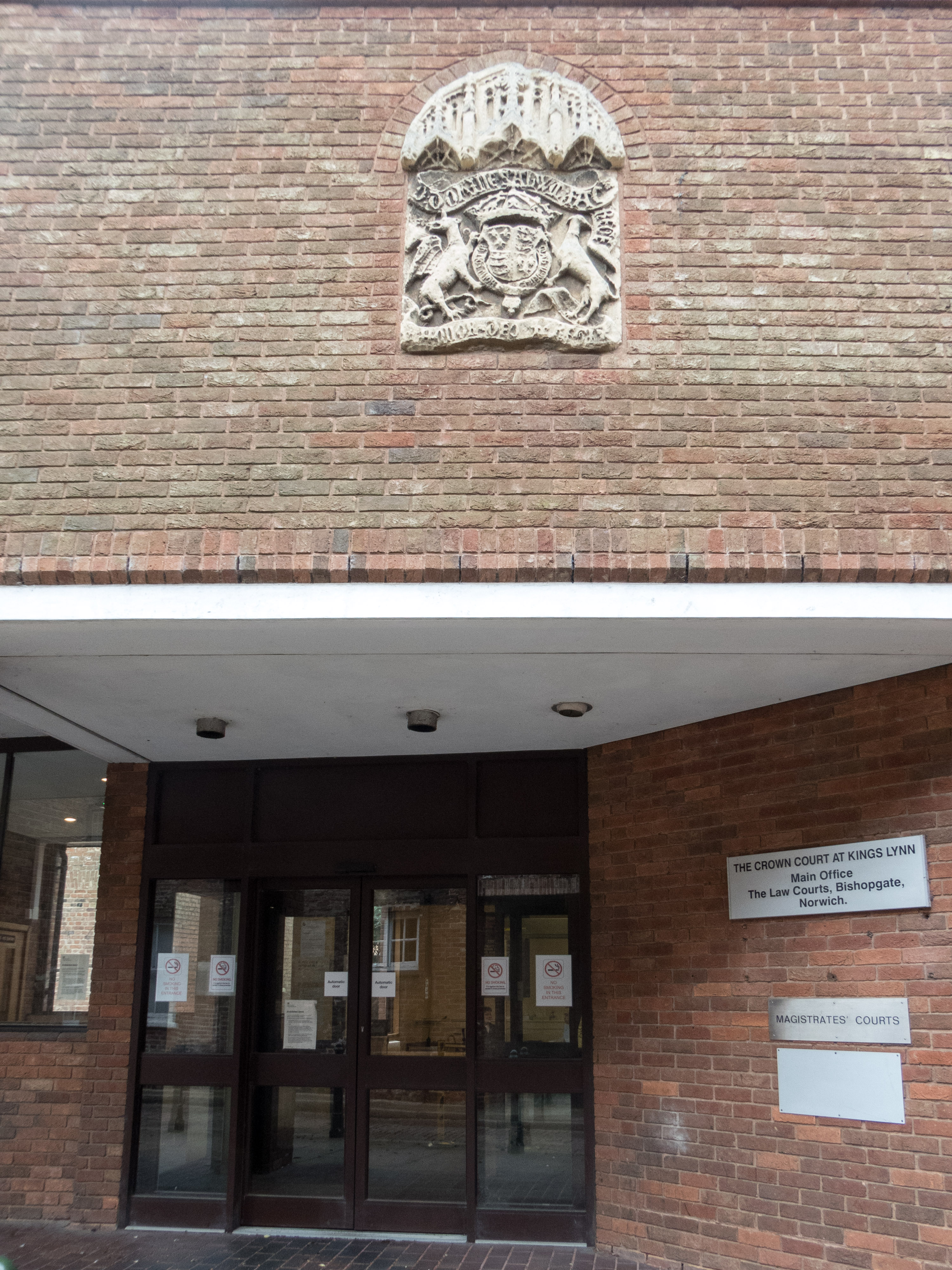
- The entrance to King's Lynn Crown Court

- Shown in Norfolk
- 52.7517°N 0.3938°E
- Location: College Lane, King's Lynn

History
- Built: 1982

Site notes
- Architect: Leonard Manasseh and Partners
- Architectural style: Modern style

King's Lynn Crown Court is a Crown Court venue which deals with criminal cases at College Lane, King's Lynn, England. The building also accommodates the local Magistrates' court.

== History ==
Until the early 1980s, criminal court hearings were held in the Guildhall in Saturday Market Place. However, as the number of court cases in King's Lynn grew, it became necessary to commission a more substantial courthouse for criminal court hearings. The site selected by the Lord Chancellor's Department, on the corner of College Lane and South Quay, had been occupied by a maltster's warehouse, operated by Alexander and James Bowker, which was built in the late 18th century.

The new building was designed by Leonard Manasseh and Partners in the Modern style, built in red brick at a cost of £1.1 million, and was completed in 1982. The design involved a long asymmetrical main frontage facing onto College Lane. The main entrance was recessed into the main frontage at the left-hand end; a Royal coat of arms of King Henry VIII, which had been recovered from the East Gate when it was demolished in the early 19th century, was installed at first-floor level above the entrance. The rest of the main frontage was fenestrated by pairs of tall casement windows inserted into triangular recesses along the whole length of the building. On the South Quay frontage there was a prominent polygonal look-out tower which recalled a tower which had projected from the old warehouse. Internally, the principal room inside the complex was the main courtroom.

Notable cases have included the trial and conviction of Birute Klicneliene, in November 2022, for the murder of Dace Kalkerte, who had been stabbed 16 times.
