= Ano, šéfe! =

- Starring: Zdeněk Pohlreich
- Country of origin: Czech Republic
- No. of seasons: 7
- No. of episodes: 95

Production
- Running time: 50 minutes

Original release
- Network: Prima televize
- Release: 5 March 2009 – 1 October 2018

Ano, šéfe! (Yes Chef!) was a television entertainment-gastronomy reality show broadcast by Prima televize featuring Zdeněk Pohlreich, as a recognized expert in the field of gastronomy and restaurant management. It was Czech adaptation of British BAFTA and Emmy award-winning show Ramsay's Kitchen Nightmares (broadcast in the Czech Republic as Ano, šéfe s Gordonem Ramseym, literally Yes Chef with Gordon Ramsay).

Zdeněk Pohlreich's qualifications and skills were at odds with his vocabulary of obscene words on the air. The aim of each part was to help various restaurant establishments improve the kitchen, guest service, overall impression of the business and the attitude of its employees and management to achieve better profits.

Between 2009 and 2018, a total of 7 seasons of the program premiered on TV Prima. In 2013, the follow-up program Už dost, šefe! was also broadcast, in which Zdeněk Pohlreich returns to some of the restaurants from the previous series of the program. Thanks to its popularity in the Czech Republic, the Slovak version called Áno, šéfe! was broadcasts on Slovak TV JOJ.

The show ended after 95 episodes in 2018, and is loosely followed by the show Ano, šéfová! with female gastronome and restaurateur Jitka Pagana and her Italian son Santo. However, it was not very successful with the audience and in the end only one series of six episodes was broadcast. In February 2020, Zdeněk Pohlreich returned to the screens again in a show with a similar format called Superšéf. In 2022, TV Prima launched the program Jak to bylo, boss?, in which, among other things, Zdeněk Pohlreich returns to situations known from the show Ano, šéfe!
