= Nick Anderson (chef) =

British chef and restaurateur

- Born: England
- Culinary career
- Current restaurant: The Boxing Hare
- Previous restaurants: The Bell, Hampton Poyle; Rococo, King's Lynn

Nick Anderson is a Michelin-starred British chef and restaurateur. He has been the head chef at The Boxing Hare, in Chipping Norton, West Oxfordshire, since 2017.

== Career ==
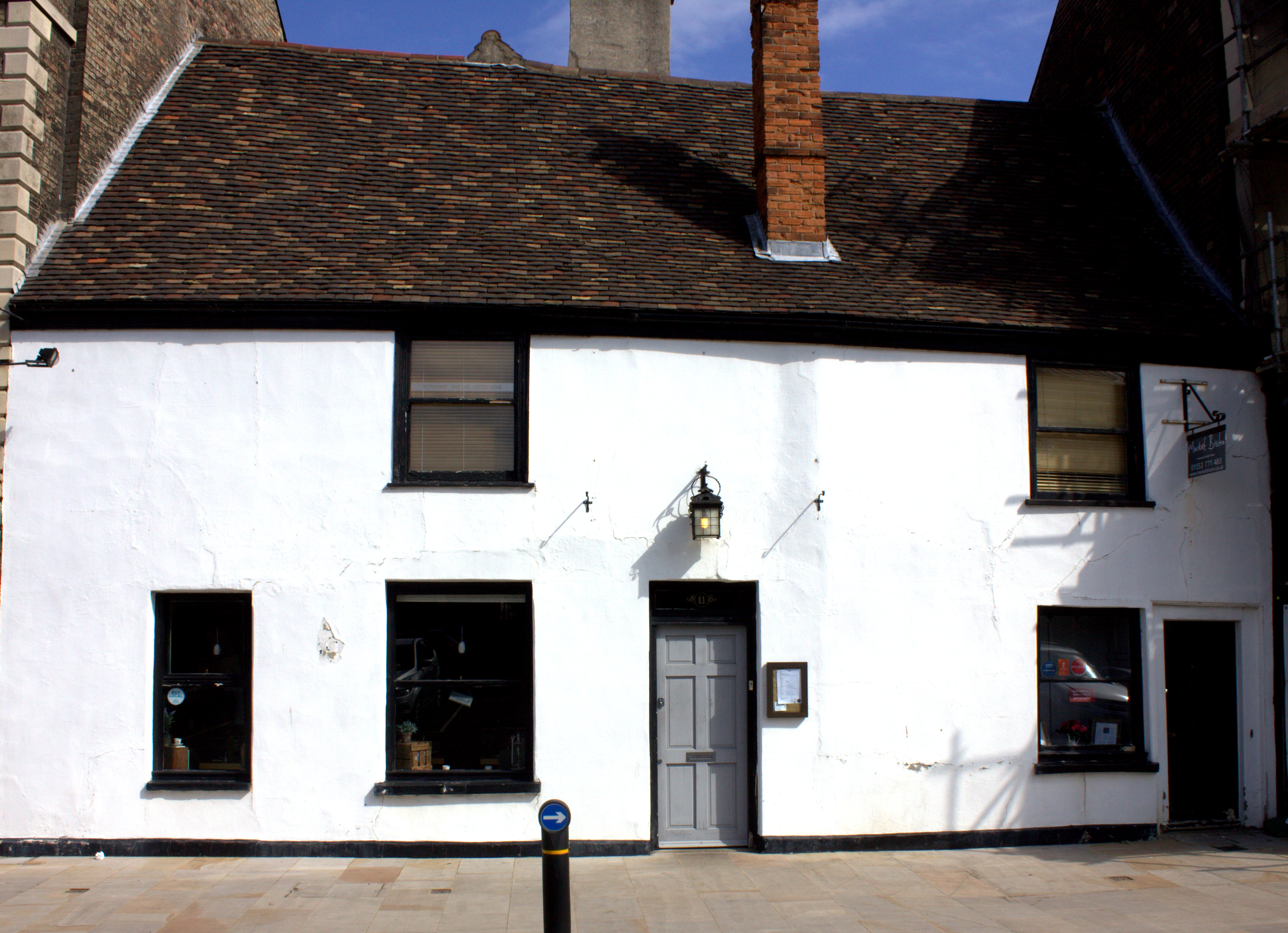
10–11 Saturday Market Place in King's Lynn, the home of Anderson's restaurant Rococo between 2005 and 2007

Anderson attained his first head-chef role in 1987, at Antony Griffith Harris's The Canal Brasserie in London.

In 1991, he left The Canal and opened Nick's Bistro @ Rococo, in King's Lynn, Norfolk, within a 17th-century building. In 2001, Anderson closed the restaurant and moved Rococo from King's Lynn to The Crown in Wells-next-the-Sea. It opened in June 2001. In 2004, he and his financial backers parted ways, forcing Anderson to leave the hotel. He spent almost a year on unemployment, and became bankrupt.

In 2005, Anderson returned to King's Lynn and reopened Rococo. His sous-chef was Tim Sanford. The restaurant closed in 2007.

Anderson worked at The Bell, in Hampton Poyle, Oxfordshire, for seven years. It was owned by George Dailey.

In 2017, Anderson was reunited with Antony Griffith Harris when he became head chef at The Boxing Hare (formerly the Masons Arms) in Chipping Norton, West Oxfordshire.

=== Television appearances ===
Anderson and his restaurant, Nick's Bistro @ Rococo, was featured in a Ramsay's Kitchen Nightmares episode that aired in November 2006. It was renamed to Maggie's during the show.

=== Awards ===
He has won three AA rosettes and two Michelin stars.

== Personal life ==
In the early 2000s, Anderson was married to Susannah, with whom he had two sons. Upon closing Rococo, the couple divorced. Anderson remarried, to Kate, in 2015. The pair initially worked together at The Bell, and now at The Boxing Hare.
