= Moore Place =

Building in Esher, Surrey, England

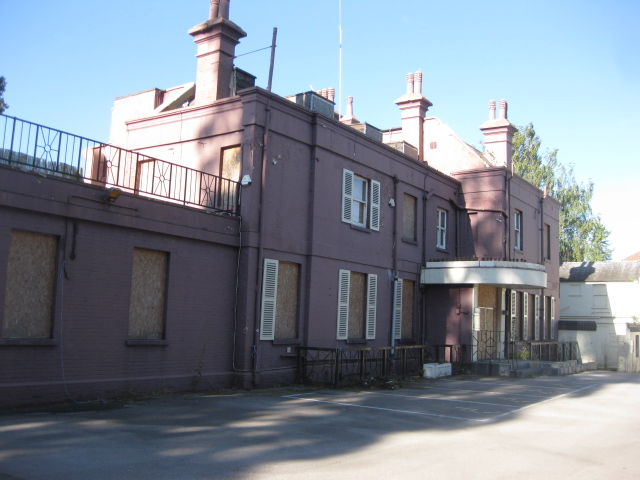
- Pictured in 2010
- Interactive map of the Moore Place area

General information
- Location: Portsmouth Road, Esher, Surrey, England
- Coordinates: 51.366340°N 0.369912°W
- Completed: c. 1900
- Demolished: 2010

Technical details
- Floor count: 2.5

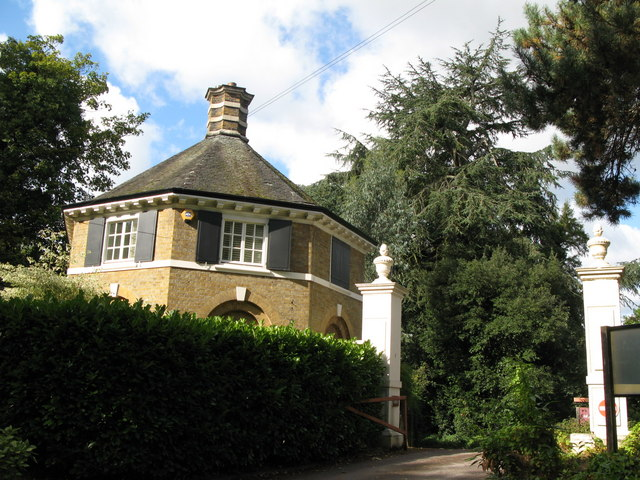
The building's listed gate lodge

Moore Place was a historic mansion in Surrey, England. It was known as the "gateway to Esher", the town in which it stood. It was demolished in 2010, having stood for around a century.

The building's gate lodge, completed in 1905, survives and is Grade II listed. Moore Place was listed in The Survey Gazetteer of the British Isles in 1914.

== History ==
Built in the late 18th century or early 19th century, replacing a house which had been there since the Middle Ages, the mansion had a glasshouse and formal garden, along with a nine-hole golf course which was opened in 1926.

Alfred Hayes was living at Moore Place in 1860. Edmund Henry Hayes was the occupant three years later. Lady Byron, widow of Lord Byron, lived at the mansion in the first half of the 19th century.

In the 1920s, the building became a hotel and restaurant. It was later painted purple, which became a talking point. In the second half of the 20th century, it became a Berni Inn and a Beefeater.

In 2004, Gordon Ramsay visited the restaurant in an early episode of Ramsay's Kitchen Nightmares. The restaurant had been recently purchased by Richard Hodgson and Nick Whitehurst, neither of whom had a catering background. They sold the business in 2006, when it became Esteem, another bar and restaurant. That business also failed, and the property was purchased by Moore Place Holdings. They were given permission to demolish the building, which happened in 2010. It was replaced in December 2015 by a care home.

The adjacent golf club and course closed in 2019, after almost a century in business. In 2025, plans were submitted to build around 300 homes on the land.
