= Loïc Lefebvre =

French chef and restaurateur

- Born: 4 December 1976 (age 49); France
- Culinary career
- Cooking style: Contemporary Cuisine
- Current restaurant: L’Atelier du Peintre
- Previous restaurant(s): La Riviera Abstract Contrast
- Website: www.atelier-peintre.fr

Loïc Lefebvre (born 4 December 1976) is a Michelin-starred French chef and restaurateur. He is the chef-owner of L’Atelier du Peintre in Colmar, France.

== Early life and training ==
Lefebvre studied at Lycée Alain Fournier in Verdun, France.

He spent his formative years of technical training in France in the Michelin-starred kitchens of Christian Willer (of Le Palme d'Or Restaurant), twin brothers Jacques and Lourent Pourcel (of Le Jardin des Sens) and Jacques Chibois (of La Bastilde Saint-Antoine).

Lefebvre has been chef for former President of France, Jacques Chirac.

== Career ==
=== Restaurants ===
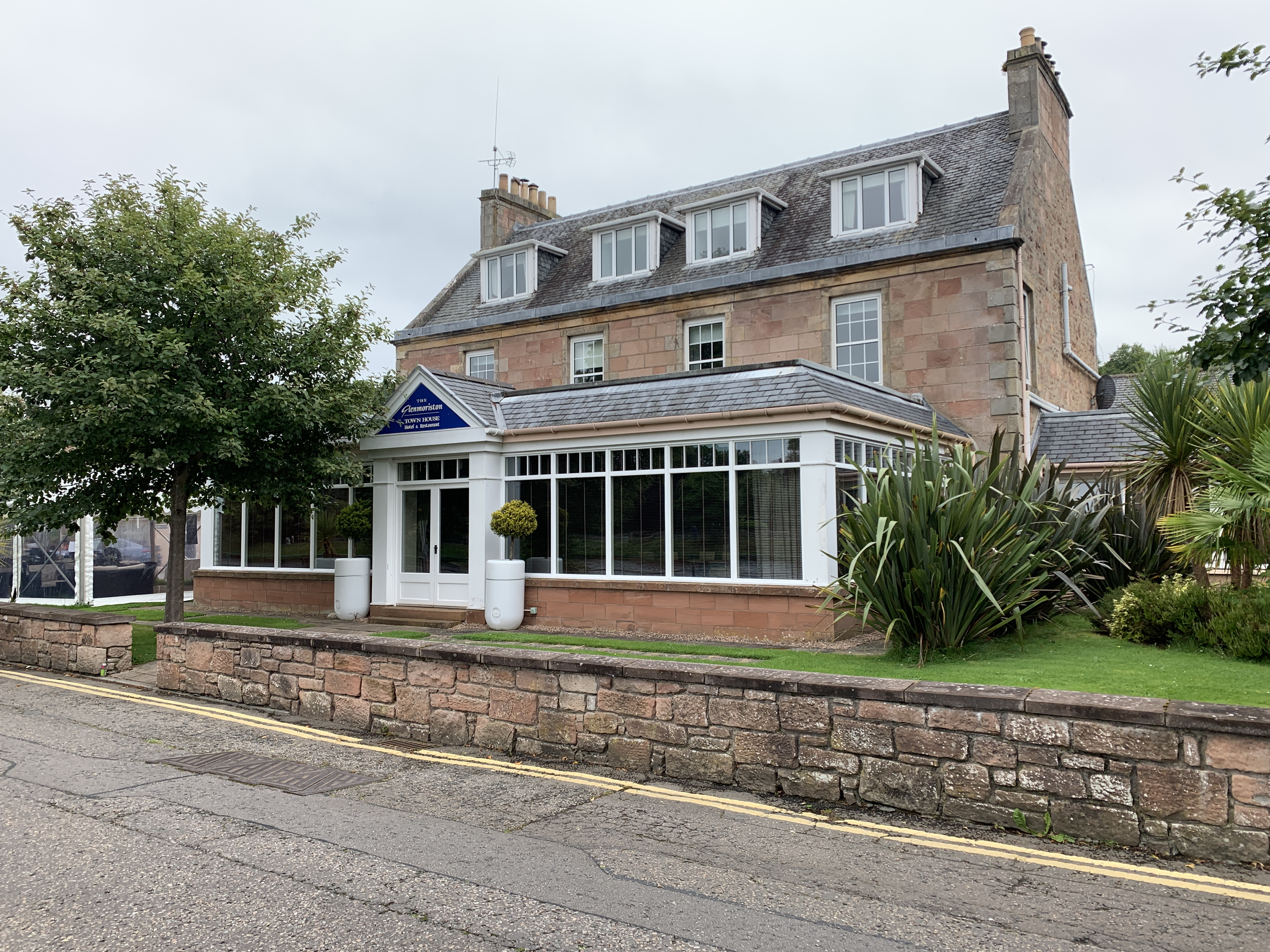
The Glenmoriston Town House Hotel, where Lefebvre began his career

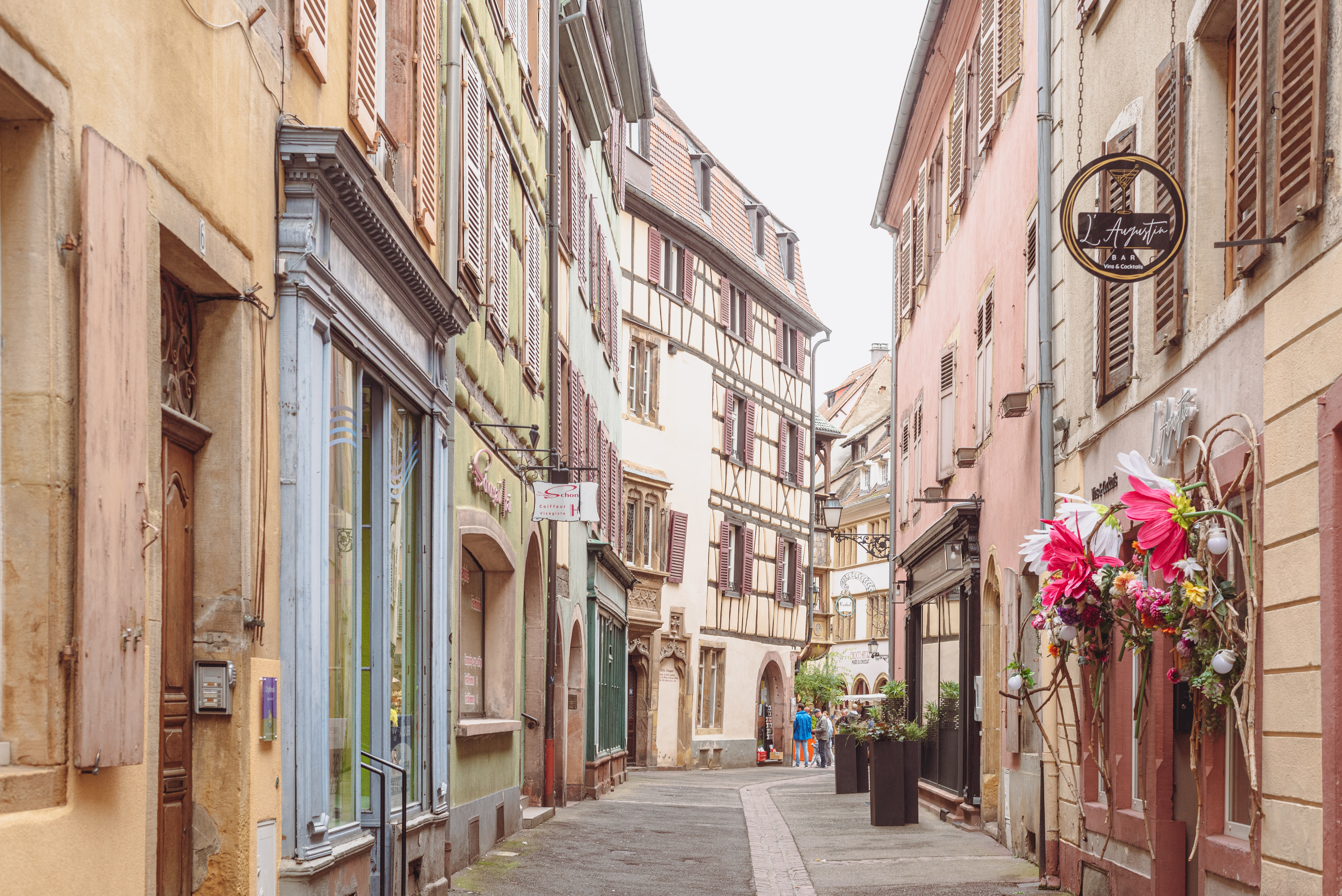
L’Atelier du Peintre (black frontage) is on rue Schongauer in Colmar

Lefebvre's first head chef position, at 28 years of age, was at La Riviera, a restaurant at the Glenmoriston Town House Hotel and restaurant in Inverness, Scotland, owned by multi-millionaire Barry Larsen. He was in charge of four compatriot chefs, and the aim was to garner a coveted Michelin star.

Larsen changed La Riviera's name to Abstract, before opening a second restaurant, named Contrast, next door in June 2006.

In March 2007, after three years in Inverness, Lefebvre moved to Edinburgh, where he and Larsen had planned to open a second location under the Abstract name. After a disagreement, Lefebvre returned to France in May 2007. The second location closed in January 2010.

Lefebvre opened the 40-seat L’Atelier du Peintre in Colmar, France, in March 2009. L’Atelier du Peintre translates as The Painter's Studio in English.

=== Television appearances ===
Lefebvre was featured in a Ramsay's Kitchen Nightmares episode that aired in June 2005. Gordon Ramsay and his team visited La Riviera the previous winter. The show revisited the restaurant twice: once two months after the original; then again, two years later. After the visits, the restaurant won the Scottish Hotel Restaurant of the Year award.

=== Awards ===
L’Atelier du Peintre received a Michelin star in 2011.

== Personal life ==
Lefebvre lives with his partner Caroline Cordier, who is the restaurant manager.
