= Francesco Zanchetta =

Italian chef and restaurateur

- Born: Italy
- Culinary career
- Previous restaurant(s): Riva Incognito The Arch Hotel Pescatori The Lampery, Apex City of London Hotel

Francesco Zanchetta is an Italian chef and restaurateur. Born in Friuli, Italy, he has spent most of his career in England, having had his first head-chef role at Riva in Barnes, West London, in 1990. Working under owner Andrea Riva, he remained there for sixteen years, before moving on to similar roles at Austini's, Incognico, The Arch Hotel, Pescatori and The Lampery at the Apex City of London Hotel between 2008 and 2019.

In 2018, Zanchetta moved into catering, beginning with Create Food Limited, followed by Create Catering and Events Melbourne. In 2019, he became chef manager at CH&CO. In 2023, he began his current role at Accent Catering Services.

In a 2005 episode of Ramsay's Kitchen Nightmares, Gordon Ramsay visited Zanchetta at Riva with Alexander Scott, owner of an Italian restaurant in Letchworth he was trying to save.
