= 10–11 Saturday Market Place =

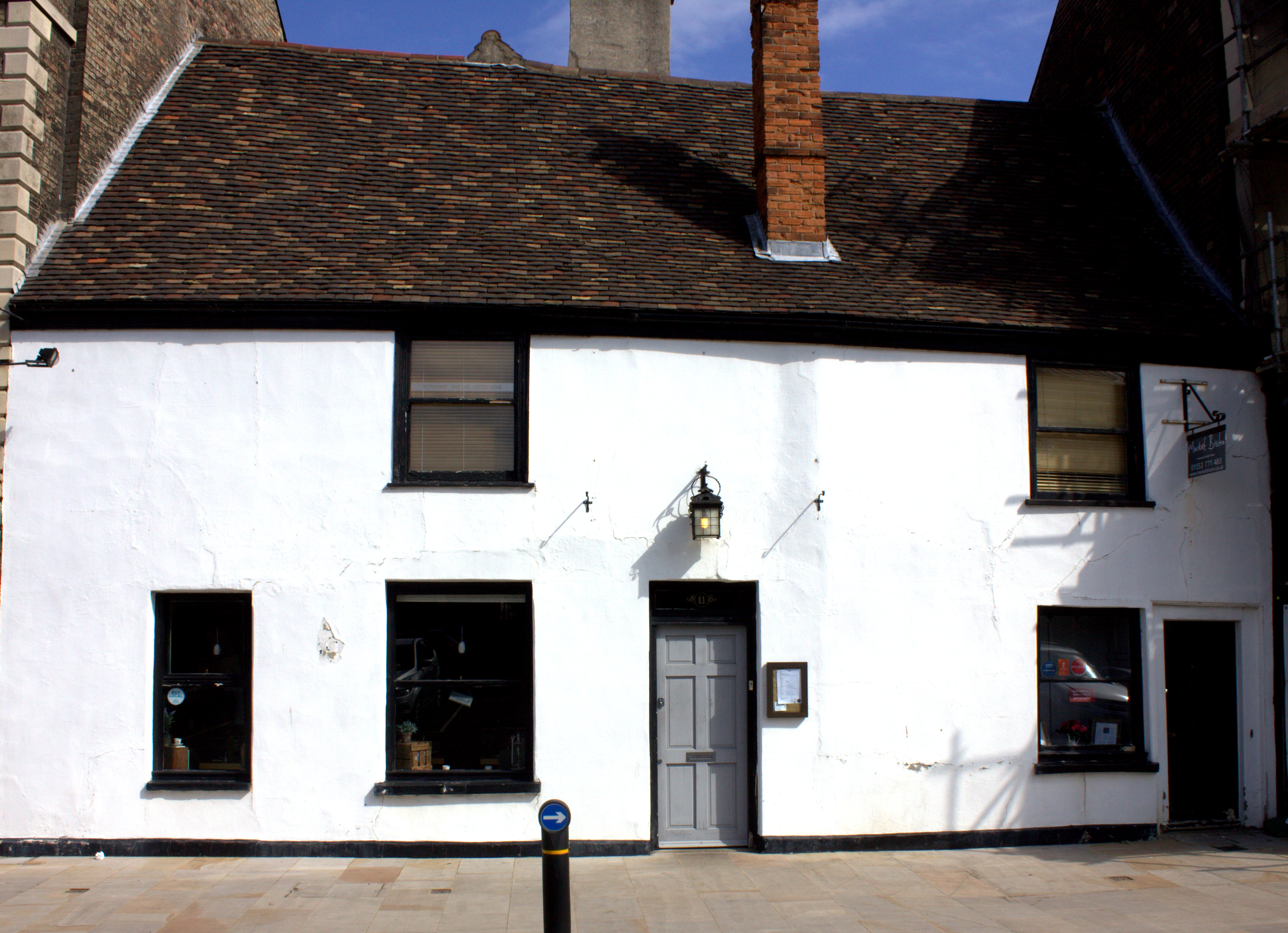
- The building in 2017

- Shown in England
- 52.75206661°N 0.3950898°E
- Location: 10–11 Saturday Market Place, King's Lynn, Norfolk, England

History
- Built: 17th century

Site notes
- Governing body: Historic England

Listed Building – Grade II
- Official name: Charter House Restaurant
- Designated: 1 December 1951
- Reference no.: 1298156

10–11 Saturday Market Place is a historic building in Saturday Market Place, the main market square in King's Lynn, Norfolk, England. It stands opposite the northern side of King's Lynn Minster, while King's Lynn Town Hall is attached to its western end.

== Structure ==
Originally a house, built in the 17th century, it has since been various restaurants. It is built of brick which has been rendered and colour-washed. It has a plain-tiled roof, with a central panelled main door, with a secondary one to the right. Between these two doors is a plate-glass sash window, dating to the late 19th century. Two more, modern, windows are located to the left of the main door.

The first floor has two late-19th-century sash windows.

The building, which has a gabled roof, was altered in the 20th century.

== Occupants ==
In the mid-20th-century, the home was converted to a restaurant named The Charter House.

Between 1991 and 2001, it was Rococo, a fine-dining restaurant owned by Nick Anderson. Anderson closed the restaurant in 2001, before moving to Wells, Somerset, but returned in 2005.

The building was occupied between 2010 and 2020 by Market Bistro.

== See also ==
- List of buildings in King's Lynn
