= Gordon Baldwin =

English studio potter (1932–2025)

Gordon Baldwin OBE
- Born: 10 July 1932; Lincoln, England
- Died: 18 May 2025 (aged 92)
- Education: Lincoln School of Art, Central School of Art and Design
- Occupation: Potter
- Known for: Studio pottery

Gordon Nelson Baldwin OBE (10 July 1932 – 18 May 2025) was an English studio potter.

== Early life ==
Baldwin was born in Lincoln on 10 July 1932, the only child of Lewis Baldwin, an engineer, and his wife Elsie (nee Hinton). After secondary education at Lincoln School, Baldwin attended the Lincoln School of Art where he initially studied painting under Tony Bartl; at Lincoln he was first introduced to studio potter and ceramics tutor Robert Blatherwick who influenced his work. He later studied at the Central School of Art and Design (1950–53).

== Career ==
Baldwin was teacher of Ceramics and Sculpture at Eton College for 39 years. He was influenced by contemporary sculpture and worked with both earthenware and stoneware.

Gordon Baldwin was one of the most important ceramic sculptors of his generation and created ceramic art throughout his 70 year artistic career (Photographs of Gordon Baldwin Art by year) and has 20+ published books of his ceramic works.

His work has been exhibited worldwide and is represented in many public collections.

Stories and memories of Gordon Baldwin's life and from his teaching career at Central School of Art and Design and Eton College are submitted and shared online:
"I was lucky enough to stay at the Baldwins’ Willowbrook House, Eton in the 1980s. Standing proud in the garden were three larger than life ceramic sculptures by Gordon. During the day the forms were very dramatic, perhaps a little like giant chess pieces. At night they transformed, in my imagination, into ghostly forms."
— Chris Parkhouse

Baldwin was sometimes called on to operate the potter's wheel as an interlude piece on BBC One television in the absence of Georges Aubertin. He recalled of his stints there:
"It was nerve wracking because it was live television in those days. It was terrifying. I said sometimes things go wrong at the wheel and the producer said 'just smile and take another piece of clay and start again'. But it didn't go wrong, fortunately."
- Gordon Baldwin

Baldwin was appointed OBE in the 1992 Birthday Honours and received an honorary doctorate from the Royal College of Art, London, in 2000.

Baldwin increasingly relied on touch to do his work when he lost his eyesight in around 2012.

== Personal life and death ==
By 1996, Baldwin settled at Market Drayton in Shropshire, a county he first saw during his National Service in the army, when he was stationed at Oswestry.

Baldwin died on 18 May 2025, at the age of 92. He was survived by his three children and six grandchildren; his wife Nancy (nee Chandler), a painter who had been a fellow art student in Lincoln, predeceased him in 2021. His funeral took place at Emstrey Crematorium, Shrewsbury, on 17 July 2025.

== See also ==
- Studio pottery
