= Keith New =

British Modernist stained glass artist

- Born: 3 September 1925; London
- Died: 14 February 2012
- Education: Sutton and Cheam School of Art, Royal College of Art
- Notable work: Coventry Cathedral
- Movement: British modernist in stained glass

Keith New (3 September 1925 – 14 February 2012) was a stained glass artist and craftsman during his early career and a well-regarded teacher and landscape painter in later life. After studying at the Royal College of Art (RCA) New returned there, heading the RCA Stained Glass Department from 1955-1958. He served as Head of Art & Design at the Central School of Art from 1957-1964. He was Head of Foundation Studies at Kingston School of Art (later Kingston Polytechnic) from 1968-1991. In 1965 New became a Brother of the Art Workers Guild.

New is considered a pioneering British modernist in the art of stained glass and is associated with major architectural projects of the 1950s and 1960s. New worked on a design team for Sir Basil Spence’s Coventry Cathedral with Lawrence Lee and Geoffrey Clarke in which he designed three nave windows for the cathedral. He explored new techniques for working with leaded and painted glass, including glass appliqué using epoxy resins, and glass mosaic. As a stained glass artist, he completed at least 34 executed commissions for churches, schools and public buildings, some of which are now lost.

== Viewable windows ==
New’s stained glass includes:

- Three nave windows in Sir Basil Spence’s Coventry Cathedral (1953–62)
- East window at Sam Scorer’s St John the Baptist Church on the Ermine estate in Lincoln (1962)
- Re-mounting fragments of mainly 19th-century glass for Sir Denys Lasdun’s Royal College of Physicians (1963)
- Glass appliqué in Robert Matthew’s Commonwealth Institute building (1964), now the Design Museum

Other windows by New:

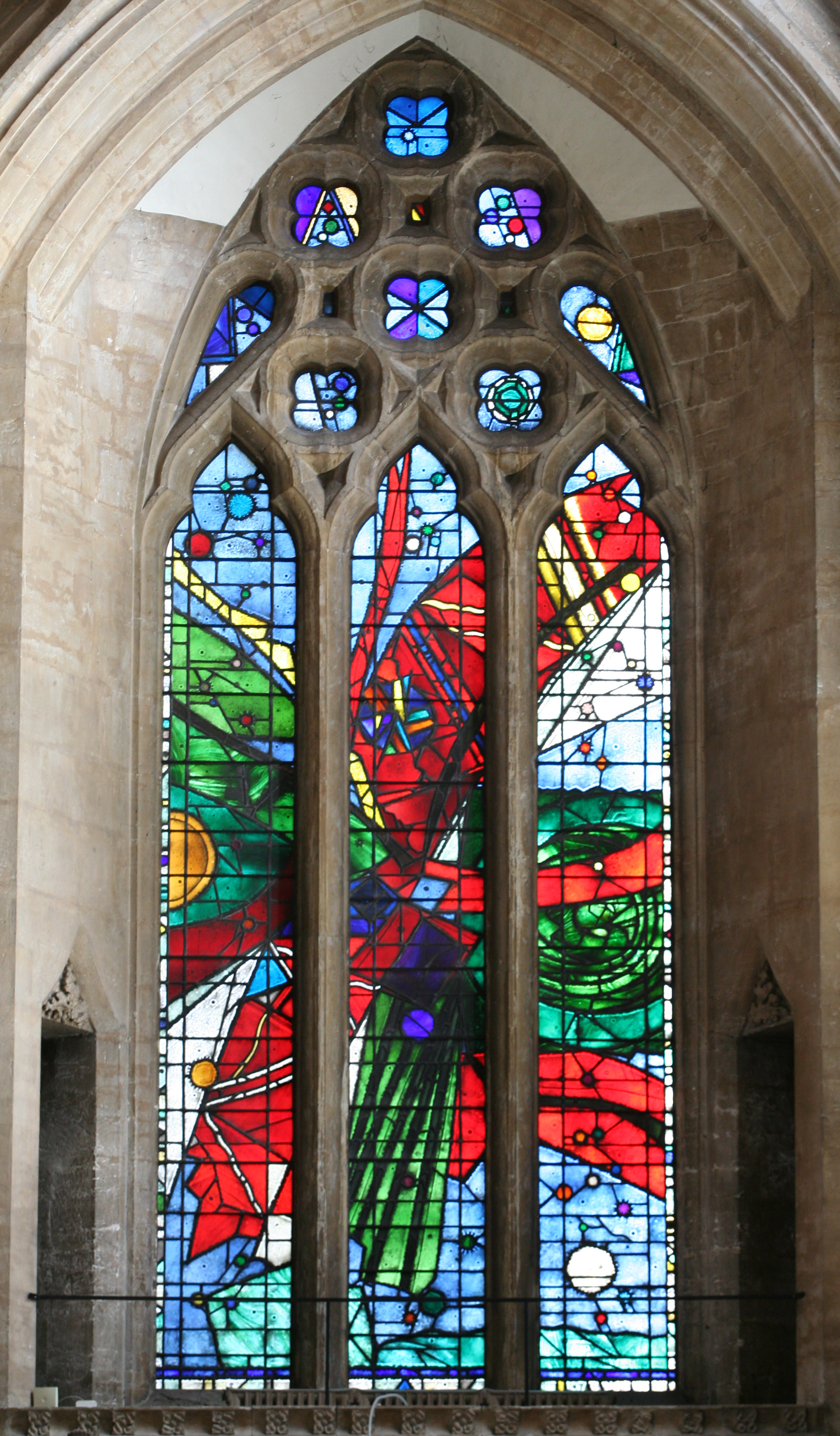
- Holy Spirit, east window, south choir aisle, Bristol Cathedral 1964
  Bristol Cathedral (1964)
- Wesley Methodist Church, Cambridge (also 1964)
- University of Glasgow Memorial Chapel, University of Glasgow (1966)

There are designs in:

- St James the Less Church in Bethnal Green (1959)
- Wren’s City of London church, St Nicholas Cole Abbey (1961)
- Reigate Heath church, Window design for a tin tabernacle showing “The Seven Gifts of the Holy Spirit” (1970)
- St Mary’s Church, South Ruislip, showing "Seven Joys and Sorrows of our Lady: the five sorrowful and five glorious mysteries"

In Norwich Cathedral, in a Millennium scheme for the north transept in 2000 by John Hayward but incorporating surviving pieces of New’s work, removed from St Stephen Walbrook Church, City of London (originally 1960–61).

== Beginnings ==
Keith New was born in London. His birth date is variously given, as 3 September 1925 and frequently as 1926. New displayed early talents for drawing and graphic design. He attended Sutton and Cheam School of Art from 1942–1945. There he met his future wife, Yvonne Byrom, who he married in 1953.

New gained a scholarship to the Royal College of Art (RCA) but deferred entry until 1948 after completion of his National Service with the Royal Air Force (RAF), during which he used his free time to develop his love of landscape drawing and painting.

New studied with the stained glass department of the Royal College of Art from 1948–53. He started in Graphic Design at the RCA, but at the end of one term switched to stained glass, run by Lawrence Lee from 1948. Encouraged by Lee and alongside fellow student Geoffrey Clarke, New flourished, becoming a star student. Both New and Clarke pushed the boundaries of stained glass design and execution; according to New, both “were committed modernists”. His dynamism brought him to the attention of John Betjeman, Basil Spence and John Piper. In 1951 one of New's designs was included in a show at South Bank, London as part of the Festival of Britain, gathering considerable attention. In his final year at the Royal College of Art, Keith won a scholarship to work for a year with Steuben and the Corning Glass Works in Corning, New York.

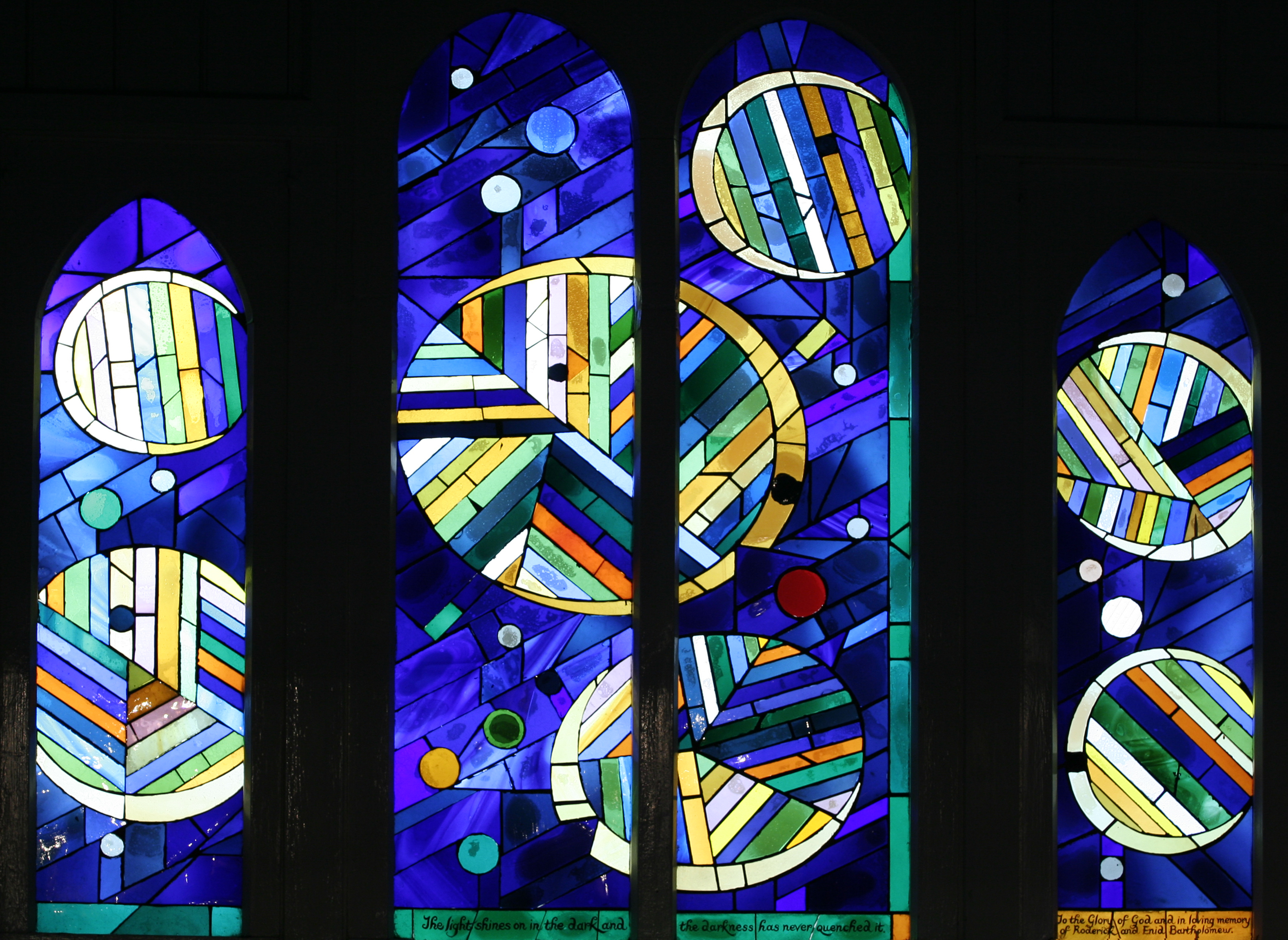
The Holy Spirit, Reigate Heath Church, Surrey (1970)

When the RCA secured the commission for the ten nave windows at Coventry Cathedral, New left Corning and returned to the RCA to execute the green windows, representing youth, as well as one of the multi-coloured windows. Space was made available within the Victoria and Albert Museum (V&A) for their design and execution as each was 70 feet or 21.3 metres high. Each artist could only work on their designs for two days a week. The first six windows to be completed were exhibited at the V&A in 1956, exciting visitors to anticipate the completed building. New supplemented his work on this significant commission with part-time teaching at the College and developing a growing portfolio of other projects, including two panels for Buckler’s Mead School in Yeovil and a nave window for Holy Trinity Church in Coleford (both 1957).

== The busy artist craftsman ==
In 1958 New took up a fellowship at Digswell House in Hertfordshire, an exciting initiative created by the educator Henry Morris, which brought together artists and craftsmen, typically at the beginning of their careers. The artists rented accommodation and used studio space to develop new techniques and work on commissions. It was certainly while there that New, inspired by the second stained glass fellow, Tom Fairs, explored the potential of glass appliqué. This technique used cement and epoxy resins in lieu of lead and the finished product could be more subtle than dalle de verre, often referred to as slab glass, a format which New is only known to have used once in a lost exhibition panel. For less wealthy parishes or for schools, glass appliqué was a more affordable option than painted and stained leaded glass. Few of New’s glass appliqué projects survive, due to the failure of the epoxy resins, which research has subsequently shown to be sensitive to ultraviolet rays.

Between 1958 and 1963 alongside the experimental projects, New worked on several important painted and stained leaded glass designs, including the clerestory windows at St Mary’s Church in South Ruislip (1958), Bethnal Green, St Nicolas Cole Abbey and St John the Baptist in Ermine. Both Bethnal Green and Ermine achieved their effect through use of coloured and flashed glass. South Ruislip continues the heavy symbolism New employed in his Coventry designs, while Bethnal Green and Ermine are abstract. In St Nicholas Cole Abbey, New’s brilliance at figurative depiction is most evident.

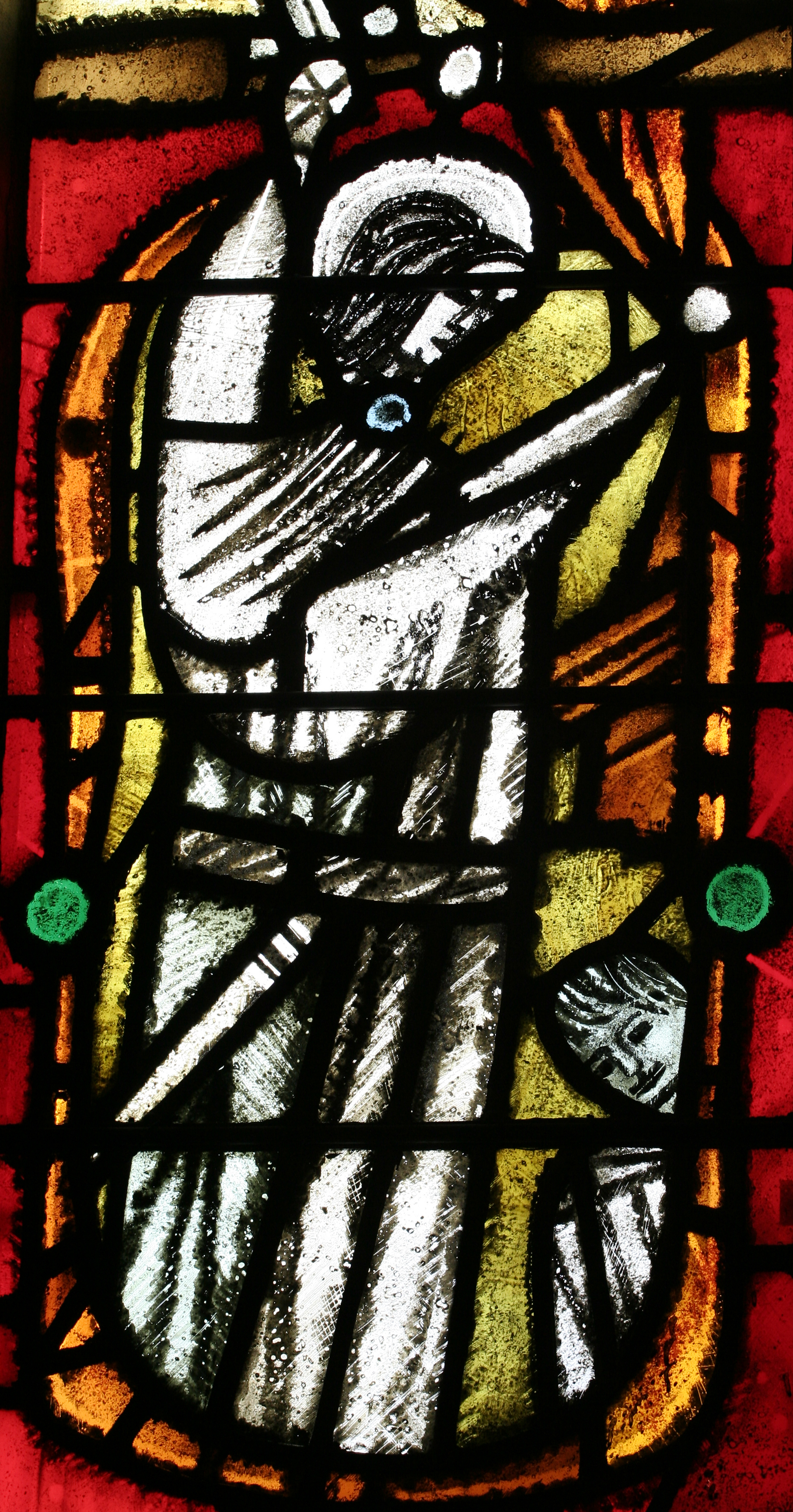
St Martin (Detail), Baptistery, All Hallows-by-the-Tower, London (1964)

In 1963, New moved into his own home in Wimbledon, London, designed for him and his family by Sam Scorer. Here he originally had a double-height studio and used his own kiln for some projects, e.g., the Royal College of Physicians, Wesley Methodist Church and All Hallows-by-the-Tower (1964). There followed an intensely creative three years that included:

- All Saints' Church in Branston, Lincolnshire (1964-65)
- Our Lady of Zion Girls' School in Highgate (1965), now La Sainte Union Catholic School
- Sheffield Cathedral, lantern in glass appliqué (1965-66, now lost)
- University of Glasgow Memorial Chapel (Gilmorehill Glasgow University Chapel).

For larger windows, such as Bristol Cathedral, New required a bigger studio, so he rented space at The Glass House, the Fulham base of Lowndes and Drury.

== Change of direction ==
A number of circumstances stimulated New to change direction at the end of the 1960s. A key driver was the challenge of maintaining momentum as a one-man band, no matter how skilled and inspiring his approach. Allied to this was the slowing down of commissions for an expensive art form; architects were beginning to use glass in their buildings in different ways. Where French artists, like Fernand Léger and Henri Matisse, had influenced the great flowering of immediate post-war British stained glass, by the late 1960s it was German artists, such as Johannes Schreiter and Ludwig Schaffrath, as well as advances in glass manufacture that led the way.

Robin Darwin, the Rector of the RCA, supported the role of stained glass in the early 1950s, was responsive to the changing enthusiasms of the 1960s art and design world. But in 1968, the stained glass department was closed, becoming "Light Transmission and Projection".

By then New had found his way to the Kingston School of Art as a teacher and the Head of Foundation Studies. At the same time New returned to landscape painting, primarily using acrylics and pastels which he made himself. The paintings he created were quite often large and for the most part displayed calming views, rarely featuring human figures, if at all, and predominantly in shades of green and blue. Some of these canvases can be found in public spaces, including the Ingram Collection.

In addition to his works in glass and his paintings, New created jacket designs for books published by Michael Joseph, and designed sets and costumes for ballets such as Reflection, put on by John Cranko at the Sadler's Wells Ballet School.

Keith New died 14 February 2012. The Service of thanksgiving for his life was held in St Mark’s Church, Wimbledon, site of his last glass commission, a nave window, constructed in 1968–9 for designers Humphreys and Hurst.
