= Catherine Scorer =

Catherine Susan Scorer (10 November 1947 – 3 April 1986) was a solicitor, an author and an active member of the National Council for Civil Liberties.

== Early life ==
She was born at University College Hospital, the daughter of architect Sam Scorer and his wife Anne.

She attended Christ's Hospital Girls' High School, a girls' grammar school, and later studied history at the University of York.

== Career ==
She was employed by the Technical, Administrative and Supervisory Section of the Amalgamated Union of Engineering Workers in 1979, first as a research officer, then as a legal officer.

She was on the executive of the Haldane Society of Socialist Lawyers and of the National Council for Civil Liberties of which she was the chair in 1983-1984. She was the council's first Northern Ireland officer and chaired its Northern Ireland committee, having been involved in the Northern Ireland Civil Rights Association. She was on the executive committee of the Communist Party of Great Britain.

She typed a statement for Kenneth Lennon, an Irish police informant, three days before he was found shot dead in a ditch in Surrey in 1974.

=== Publications ===
- Fight Tory Laws, Liaison Committee for the Defence of Trade Unions, 1985
- (with Patricia Hewitt) The New Prevention of Terrorism Act: The Case for Repeal, Civil Liberties Trust, 1985
- (with Ann Sedley) Amending the Equality Laws, Civil Liberties Trust, 1983
- Prevention of Terrorism Act: The Case for Repeal, National Council for Civil Liberties, 1981
- The Prevention Of Terrorism Acts 1974 And 1976: A Report On The Operation Of The Law, National Council for Civil Liberties, 1976

== Personal life ==
She died in 1986 at Hammersmith Hospital.
