= St John the Baptist's Church, Ermine, Lincoln =

St John the Baptist, Lincoln
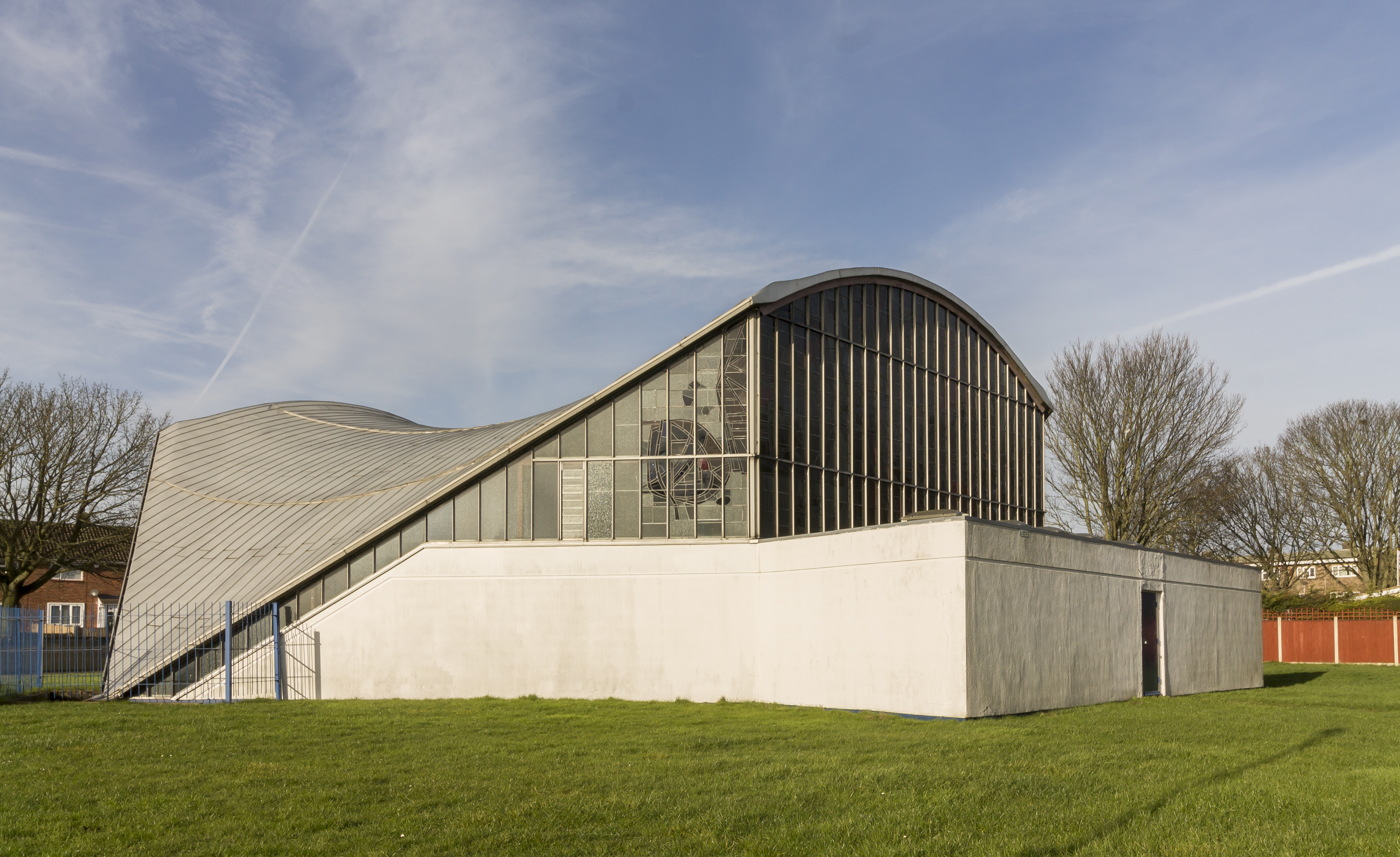
- St John the Baptist, Lincoln
- 53°14′51.5″N 0°31′51.4″W
- OS grid reference: SK 98089 73285
- Location: Lincoln
- Country: England
- Denomination: Church of England
- Website: stjohnthebaptistparishchurch.org.uk

Architecture
- Architect: Sam Scorer
- Style: Modernist
- Years built: 1962-3

Administration
- Diocese: Lincoln

St John the Baptist is a Church of England parish church on the Ermine Estate in the city of Lincoln, England. Designed by Sam Scorer and consecrated in 1963, it is a Grade II* listed building.

== History ==
The Ermine Estate is a large council estate 2 kilometres (1.2 mi) north of Lincoln city centre. The estate was built mostly 1952–1958 as a response to post-war housing shortages. The church is on Sudbrooke Drive in Ermine East. The original temporary Anglican church and combined community centre were the first public buildings opened on the estate in 1956.

=== Construction and consecration ===
Construction of a new, permanent church started in April 1962, with the main construction finished by December 1962, costing £26,500. The architect was Sam Scorer of D. Clarke Hall, Scorer & Bright (now Scorer Hawkins Architects) in Lincoln. It was built by W and J Simons (Lincoln) Ltd.

It was planned as a "tent of meeting" rather than a "static temple", and was described in the Church Times in 1963 as "Britain's most modern church". The vicar who commissioned it, the Revd John Hodgkinson, wrote "the emphasis was very much on church as people rather than a building".

The church was consecrated by the Bishop of Lincoln on 6 October 1963.

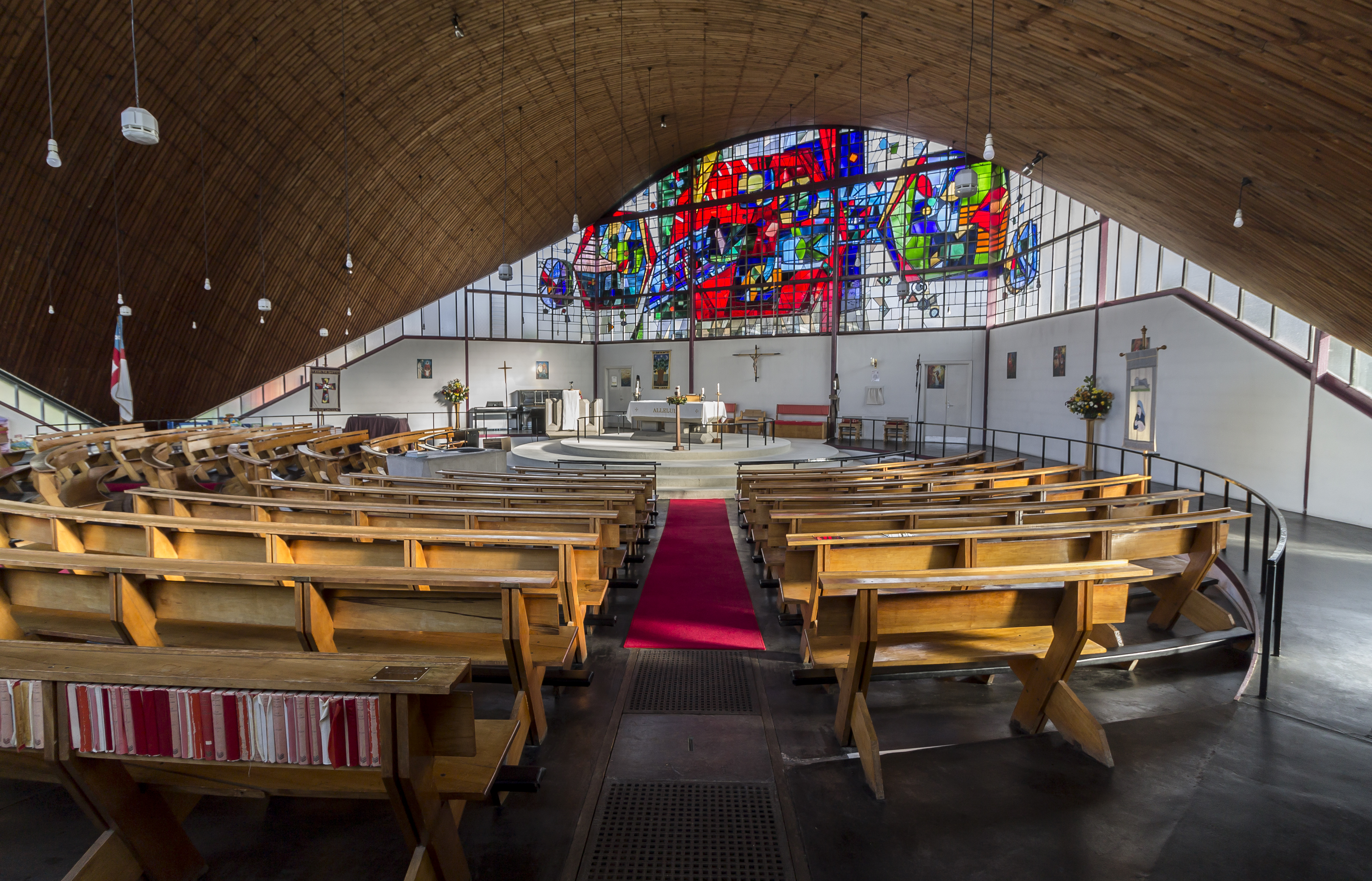
St John the Baptist interior, looking East

In 1995, it became a Grade II* listed building.

== Description ==
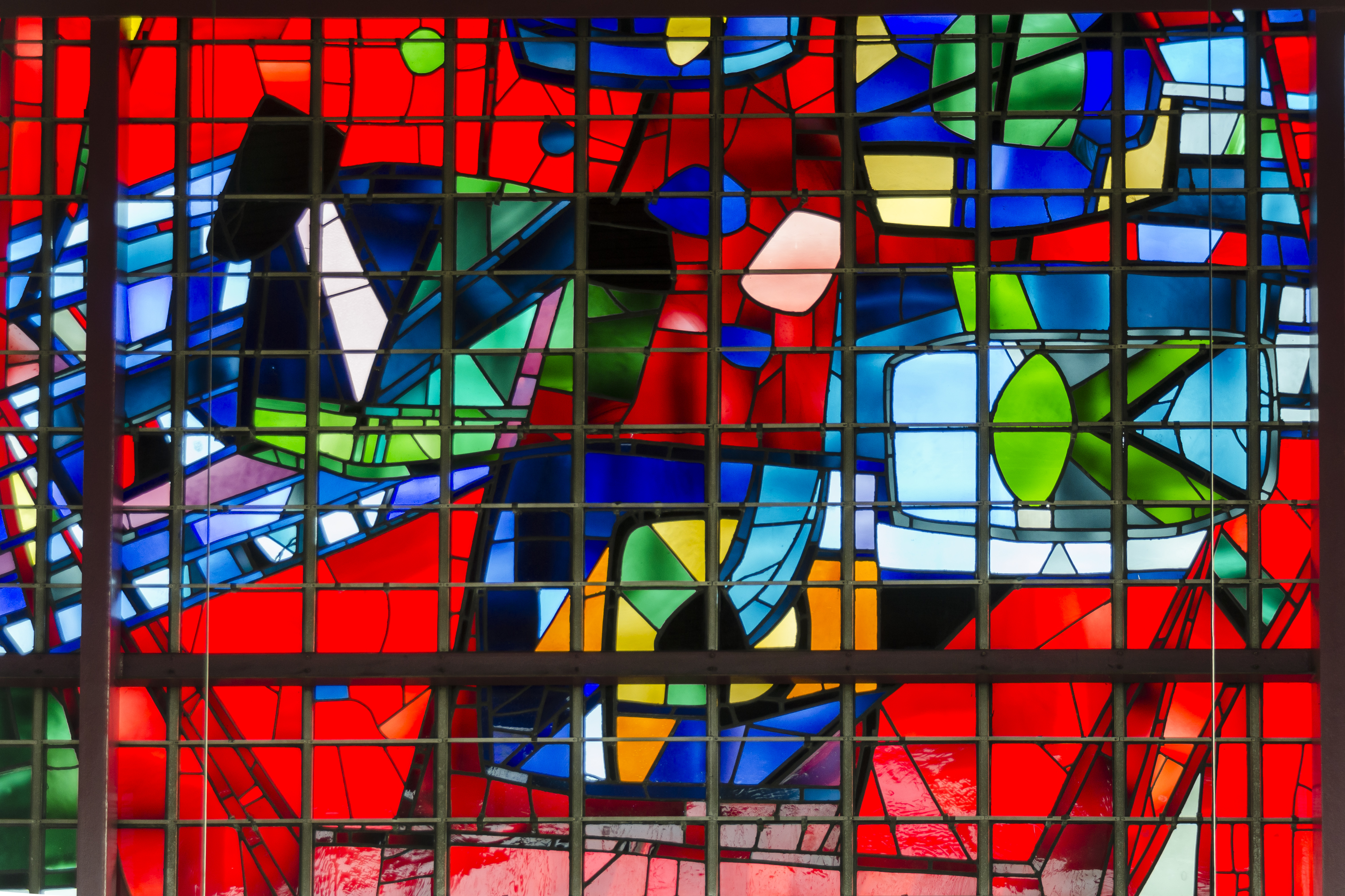
Detail of the east window by Keith New

The church's roof is a hyperbolic paraboloid rising from two points on the ground to north and south. The roof structure is of concrete, covered with aluminium. The building has a hexagonal floor plan and concrete walls. The east wall is dominated by abstract stained glass designed by Keith New, who helped design the windows of Coventry Cathedral. The altar, font and pulpit, by Scorer, are of cast concrete. The altar is raised on four steps in a circular sanctuary area to the eastern side of the hexagon. The font is placed in the central aisle, in front of the altar.

== See also ==
- Kresge Auditorium

== Literature ==
- Antram N. (revised), Pevsner N. & Harris J., (1989), The Buildings of England: Lincolnshire, Yale University Press.
