= Sam Scorer =

British architect (1923-2003)

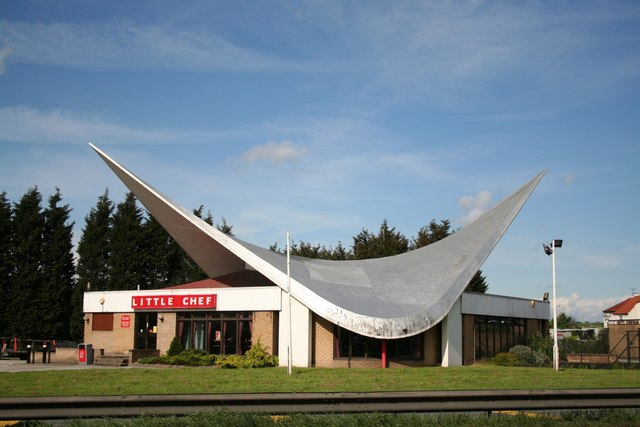
- Former petrol station, 1960–61, Markham Moor, Notts.
- Born: 2 March 1923; Lincoln, England
- Died: 6 March 2003 (aged 80); Lincoln, England
- Education: Corpus Christi College, Cambridge; Architectural Association
- Occupation: Architect
- Practice: Denis Clarke Hall & Partners; Clarke Hall, Scorer & Bright; Scorer & Hawkins (now Scorer Hawkins Architects)
- Buildings: St John the Baptist's Church, Ermine, Lincoln (Grade II*); Markham Moor petrol station (Grade II); Lincolnshire Motor Company showrooms (Grade II)
- Design: Hyperbolic paraboloid structures and architectural conservation

Hugh Segar "Sam" Scorer FRIBA FRSA (2 March 1923 – 6 March 2003) was an English architect who worked in Lincoln, England and was a leading pioneer in the development of hyperbolic paraboloid structures, particularly saddle roofs, using concrete. He also was involved in architectural conservation and research into the work of local 19th-century architects, as well as founding an art gallery in Lincoln, now known as the Sam Scorer Gallery. He held the rare distinction of having two of his buildings listed within his lifetime.

The Usher Gallery in Lincoln held an exhibition "Sam Scorer: A Life in 14 Buildings" until January 2024.

== Family ==
His grandfather was Charles Scorer (1847-1936) of 'Coombe Hurst' on Greetwell Road, the son of William Henry Scorer (1819 - 25 January 1901); the mother of Charles was Susan West, of Burwell, Lincolnshire. Charles married Anna Harriett Veitch (1846 - 31 October 1915) on 16 October 1873, in Chelsea. Charles Scorer was deputy returning officer for Sleaford elections, and worked for Burton Scorers and White; Charles died on December 13, 1936 aged 89.

Uncles were Charles Reynolds Scorer (December 2, 1876 - August 27, 1958) who lived at 'Sunny Mount', and on Drury Lane, with a daughter, Margaret Josephine, born on 25 September 1907, and Arthur Bruce Scorer (1881 - 1951); Arthur had a daughter on 27 August 1912, Gwendolen Anna Rowland Scorer, and a son Derek Rowland Scorer (January 28, 1914 - October 4, 2012), also educated at Repton. One of his aunts, Dorothy (1878-1961), married Roger Oldham on 20 April 1904, at St Nicholas in Lincoln. As a widow, Dorothy later married his brother Charles Oldham (naturalist) in 1930. His great uncle was the Lincoln architect William Scorer.

== Early life ==
He was the son of Eric Scorer (November 3, 1882 - August 11, 1966) and Maud Segar (July 4, 1883 - 19 March 1971), who lived at 'Coombe Hurst' on Greetwell Road. Eric West Scorer married Maud Segar on 23 April 1913 at St John and All Saints' Church, Easingwold. Maud was the daughter of the vicar Rev Halsall Segar.

He was brought up in Lincoln, one of five children. He was born at 11 Lindum Terrace. His mother was the treasurer of the Lincolnshire Hockey Association. In the early 1950s his father Eric was on the Central Health Services Council, and was on the BBC North Regional Advisory Council.

His father was a senior partner in a firm of solicitors and later became clerk to Lindsey County Council. His mother was a lecturer at Bishop Grosseteste College, a teacher training college; His mother died at 7 Sewell Road in March 1971.

A brother was Richard S. Scorer. Between 1936 and 1941 he attended the independent Repton School in south Derbyshire, where he became head boy and excelled at drawing.

He read Mechanical Sciences at Corpus Christi College, Cambridge in 1941, and enjoyed painting as well. In 1942 he was commissioned into the Royal Naval Volunteer Reserve and met his wife in Canada, when training to be a Fleet Air Arm pilot. He served as a fighter pilot until 1945 but was invalided out of service, having crashed while attempting to land on a moving aircraft carrier in the Baltic Sea.

Combining his interest in artwork and mechanical design, he decided to become an architect. He entered the Architectural Association School of Architecture (AA) in the second year in 1946, and graduated in 1949.

== Career ==
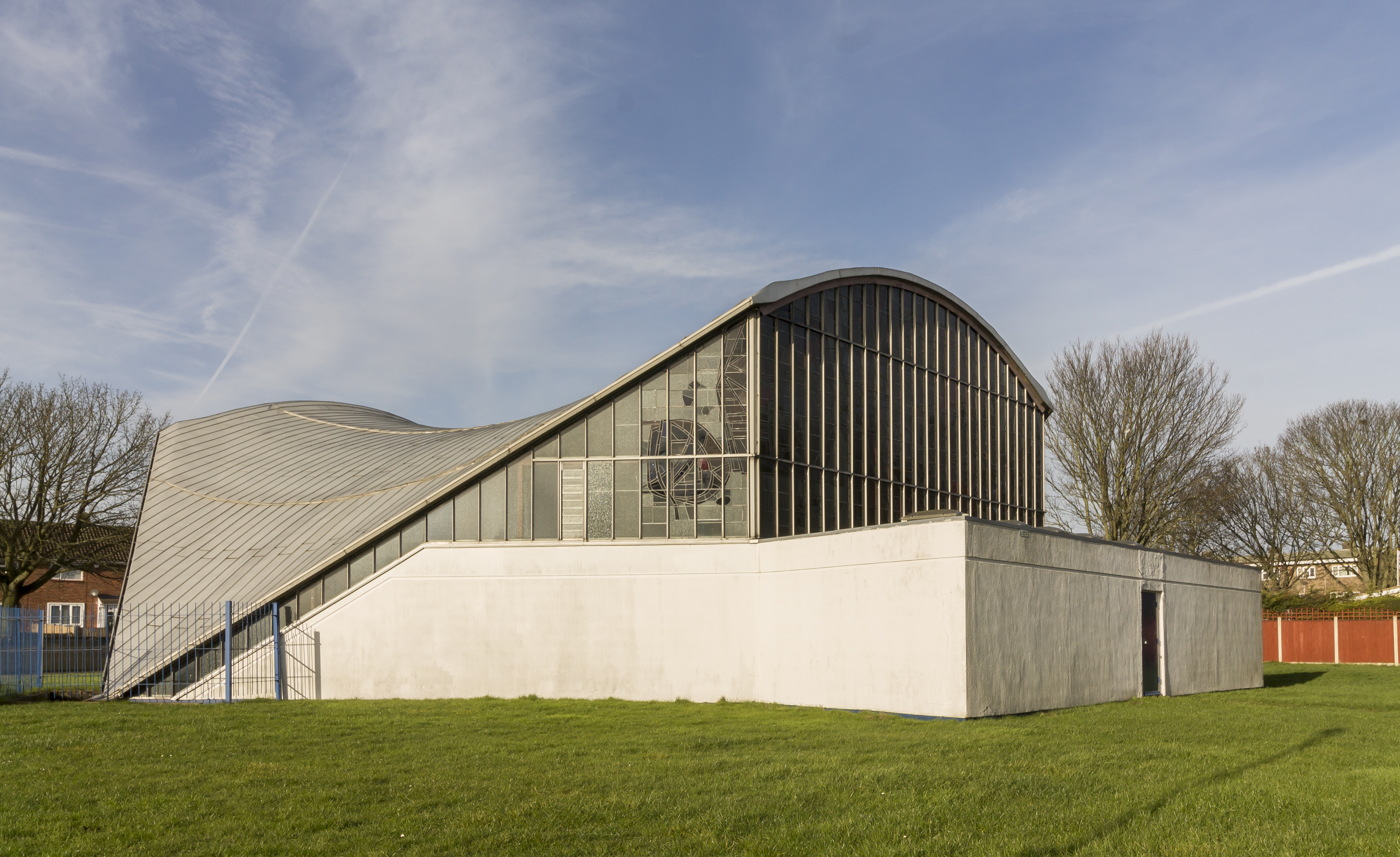
St John the Baptist's Church, Ermine, Lincoln, built in 1963

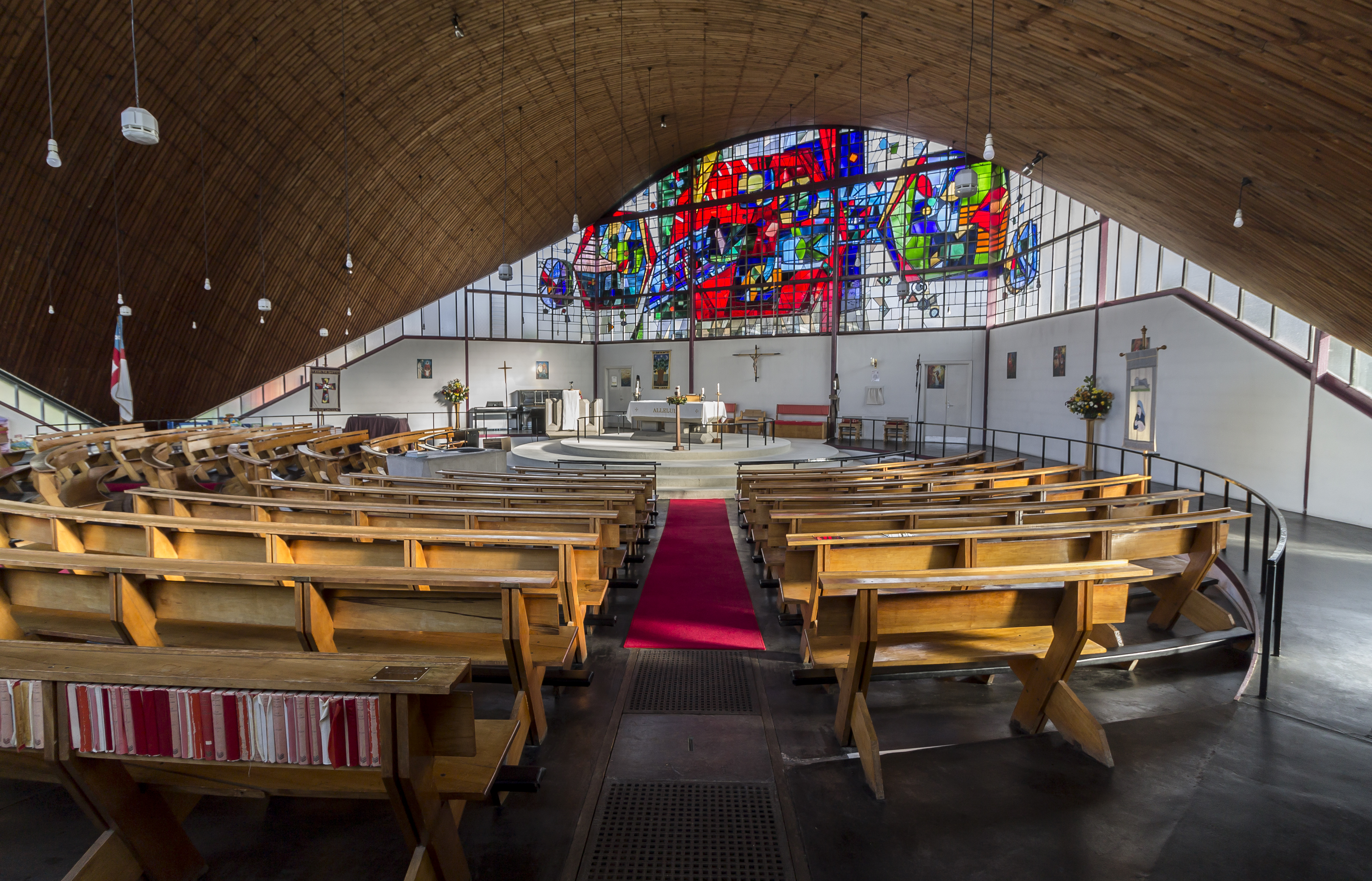
St John the Baptist interior

He worked for a year as assistant to George Grey Wornum. In 1950, he began work for Denis Clarke Hall (son of Edna Clarke Hall). His practice was at 200 High Street until January 1962. He designed Brayford House in 1959.

With Clarke Hall he designed three schools in Lincolnshire in the 1950s:

- William Farr School, Welton (1952)
- Lacey Gardens Junior School, Louth (1953)
- Riddings Comprehensive School, Enderby Road, Scunthorpe (1958 with extensions in 1965–70. Two-storey blocks with the classroom block linked to the service block by a vestibule. The kitchen is screened with a heavily rusticated or embossed wall. Vertical emphasis is provided by a watertower with glazed cistern.

From 1954, his architectural practice, Denis Clarke Hall, Scorer & Bright was based at 7 Lindum Terrace in Lincoln. Scorer was the Chairman of the RIBA East Midlands planning committee. He was the first Chairman of the East Midlands Group of the Victorian Society. In 2000 he founded The Gallery, now known as the Sam Scorer Gallery, in Lincoln.

In the 1980s his practice was Scorer and Pilling, with Bob Pilling, and Scorer & Hawkins in the 1990s, with Philip Hawkins. When the new university opened in 1996, he proposed a cable-car system to link with the north of Lincoln.

=== Hyperbolic paraboloid structures ===
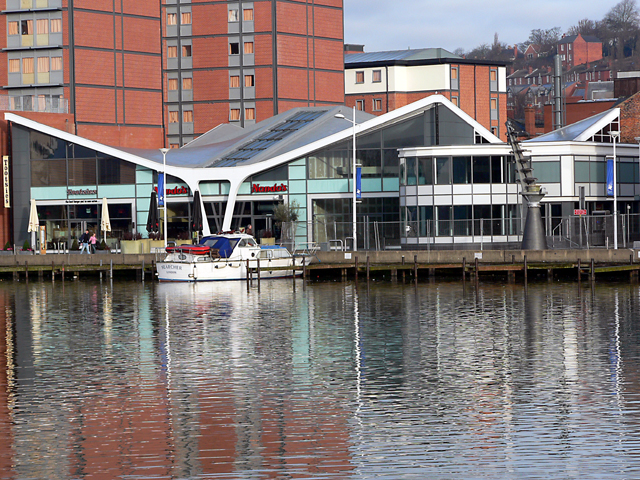
Brayford Pool restaurants – formerly Lincolnshire Motor Company showrooms

Thin shell concrete roofs were invented in Germany around the 1920s, as a means of achieving large spans with limited materials and at low cost. The strength of the roof lies in its shape, and the way it carries the loads by the forces exerted in the planes of the shell, rather than by the weight of their materials. The first shell roofs were simple barrel vaults. The earliest is Wythenshawe Bus Garage, Manchester, built 1939–42. After the Second World War, the form was taken further. One of the first engineers to specialise in concrete shell techniques in Britain was the German refugee of Hungarian-Jewish origin, Kalman Hajnal-Kónyi, who arrived in London in 1936, and who worked with Sam Scorer. Scorer became fascinated by the possibilities of shell roofs as a student, and designed a hyperbolic paraboloid roof in 1956 for a water tower in Ilkeston, Derbyshire. Félix Candela in Mexico was experimenting with ‘anticlastic’ or shells with double curvatures of opposing convexity and concavity, from which the hyperbolic paraboloid emerged. The form was particularly appropriate for developing countries because of its simple materials and low cost. The rationing of steel in the post-war period in Britain also was reason for the popularity of these designs. The 'hypar', as it is sometimes known, enjoyed a brief fashion, seen in buildings such as the Commonwealth Institute of 1960–2 and also the Wrexham Swimming Baths of 1964. Examples of Scorer's Work are:

- Lincolnshire Motor Company garage and showrooms, later used as the headquarters of the Lincolnshire Library service. Designed 1958, built 1959 by Sam Scorer of Denis Clarke Hall, Scorer & Bright; engineer Hajnal-Kónyi. Reinforced concrete construction to main former garage, with steel frame and concrete floors to circular corner block and curtain wall elevation to block facing Lucy Tower Street which has flat roof. Rear former garage, has a reinforced concrete hyperbolic paraboloid shell roof, supported on columns to provide a clear unobstructed area. Circular front showroom (now Prezzo) used to display cars. A listed building since 2000.
- Former petrol station at Markham Moor, Nottinghamshire. This same type of design was used for a petrol station (became a Little Chef restaurant in 1989 but is now a Starbucks' café) at Markham Moor on the south-bound A1/A57 near Retford, designed in 1959. The shell canopy was designated Grade II listed on 27 March 2012.
- In 1962 he designed the St John the Baptist Church in Ermine, Lincoln. Its aluminium roof is the shape of a hyperbolic paraboloid and the building has a hexagonal floor plan and concrete walls. It has been a Grade II* listed building since 1995.

== Personal life ==
He married Anne Humphrey on 8 October 1943 at St. George's Cathedral (Kingston, Ontario). His British wife was the only child of Professor George Humphrey (psychologist) (1889-1966), who worked at Queen's University at Kingston, known for Humphrey's law, formed in 1923, who lived locally to the church. His wife's mother, Muriel Miller, had married in 1918; she died 1955. They were married by Very Rev Reginald Seeley, the Dean of Ontario. His wife's father died on April 24, 1966 at 52 Sherlock Close in Cambridge. The stepmother of his wife was Berta Wolpert; Berta's sister, Maxine, was the wife of Austrian actor Peter Illing, who broadcast on the BBC German Service.

They had a son and a daughter (Catherine Scorer, who died in April 1986). His son Paul was born on 3 November 1945. Paul studied Physics at the University of Nottingham, and married in 1968, a woman from Dallington, Northamptonshire.

In the early 1950s he lived at 1 Greetwell Road. By 1959 he lived at Gibraltar Hill. By 1967 lived 7 Lindum Terrace. He drove a Jaguar E-Type. Away from architecture he was a motor-racing enthusiast, attending many of Europe's grand prix circuits. He owned a succession of fast cars, such as a Lotus Elan and various Jaguars, all with his personalised number plate of 'EVL 1'. He held life memberships of the National Trust, the Victorian Society and Reform Club and took an interest in Liberal politics.

In 1967 he proposed a radio station for Lincoln. He was in the Lincoln Fabian Society. He stood for Labour in the Carholme Ward on 11 May 1967, but lost to the Conservatives.

In September 1950 his eldest brother Philip Segar Scorer (March 22, 1916 - May 18, 2003) married Monica Smith at St Alban's church in Coopersale in south-west Essex. The service was conducted by her father, and assisted by Canon Kenneth Sansbury. Monica was the daughter of the local vicar Rev Stanley Smith. Philip had a daughter on 7 July 1951 and again on August 12, 1956. In 1972 Philip's daughter Julia married Nordahl Anthonisen, of Norway. In 1992 another of Philip's daughters married Timothy John Penn of Glamorgan.

His brother Richard stood as a Labour candidate for Esher in 1970 and 1979.

In November 1955, his sister (Joyce) Mary Segar Scorer (27 July 1921 - 25 January 2011) married General Sir Ouvry Lindfield Roberts in the King Henry VII Chapel, Westminster Abbey.

His sister Audrey Segar Veitch Scorer (December 2, 1917 - 29 October 1986) died in the county hospital.

He died in Lincoln County Hospital in March 2003, aged 80.

== Architectural work by Scorer ==
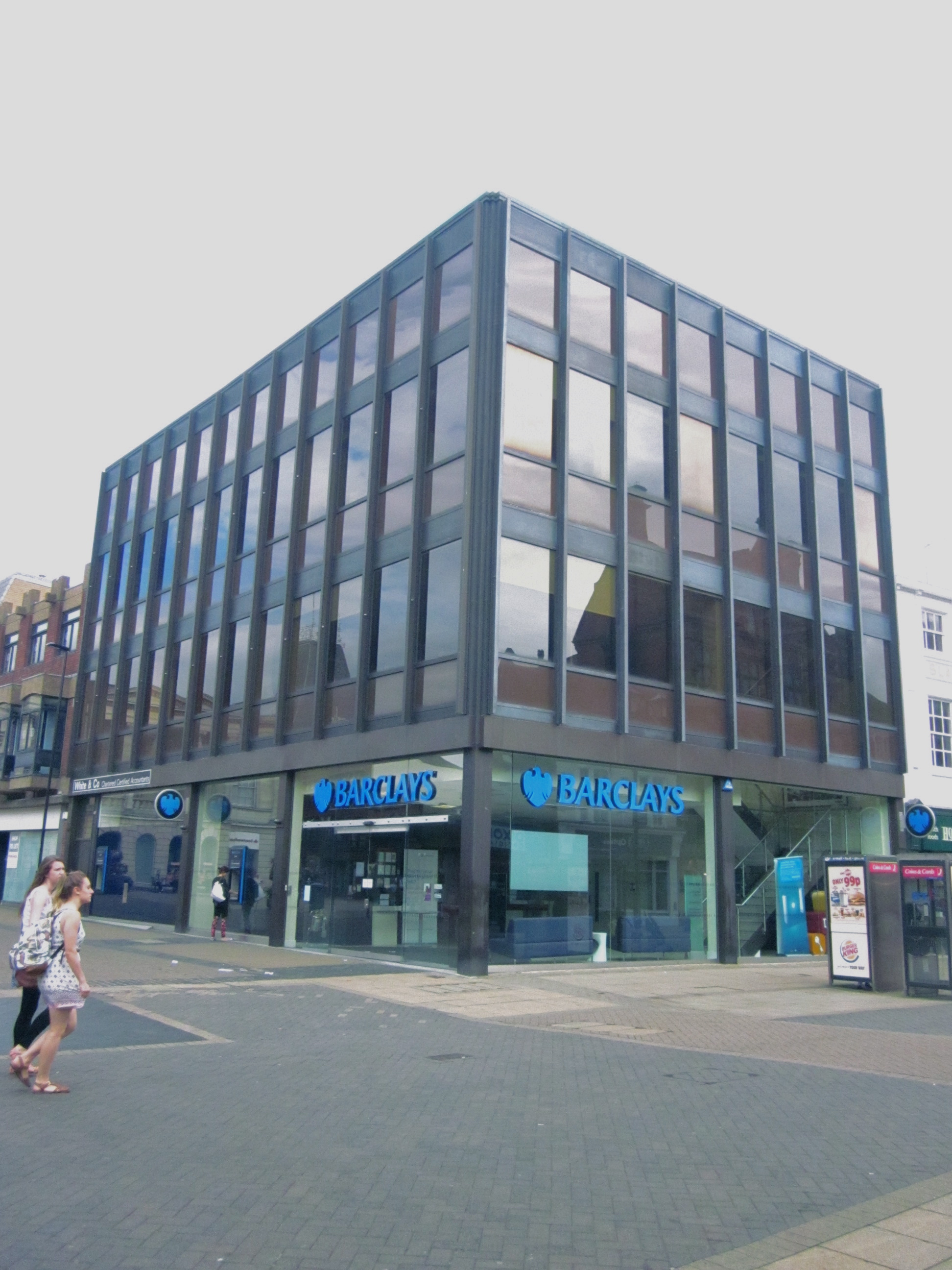
Barclays Bank, Cornhill, Lincoln

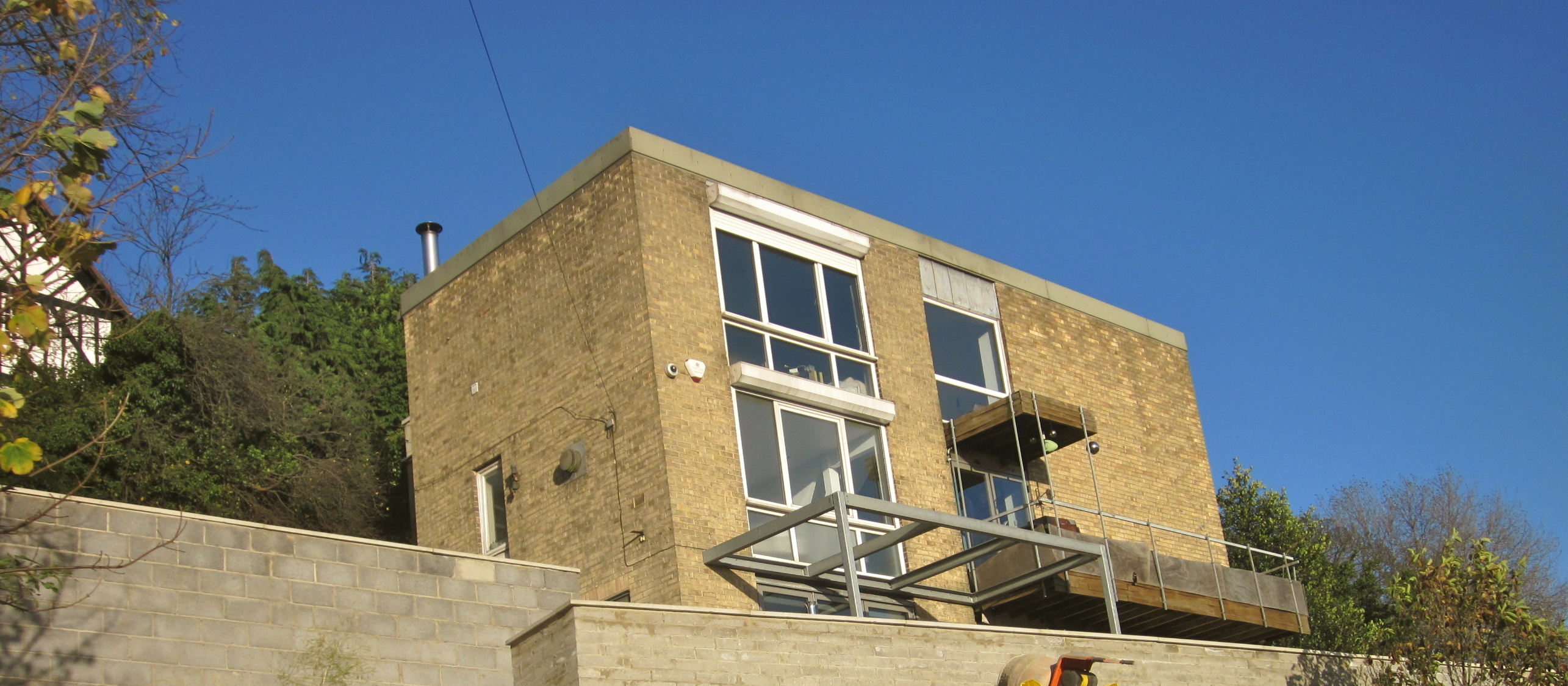
7 Gibraltar Hill, Lincoln, home of Sam Scorer. Built 1955

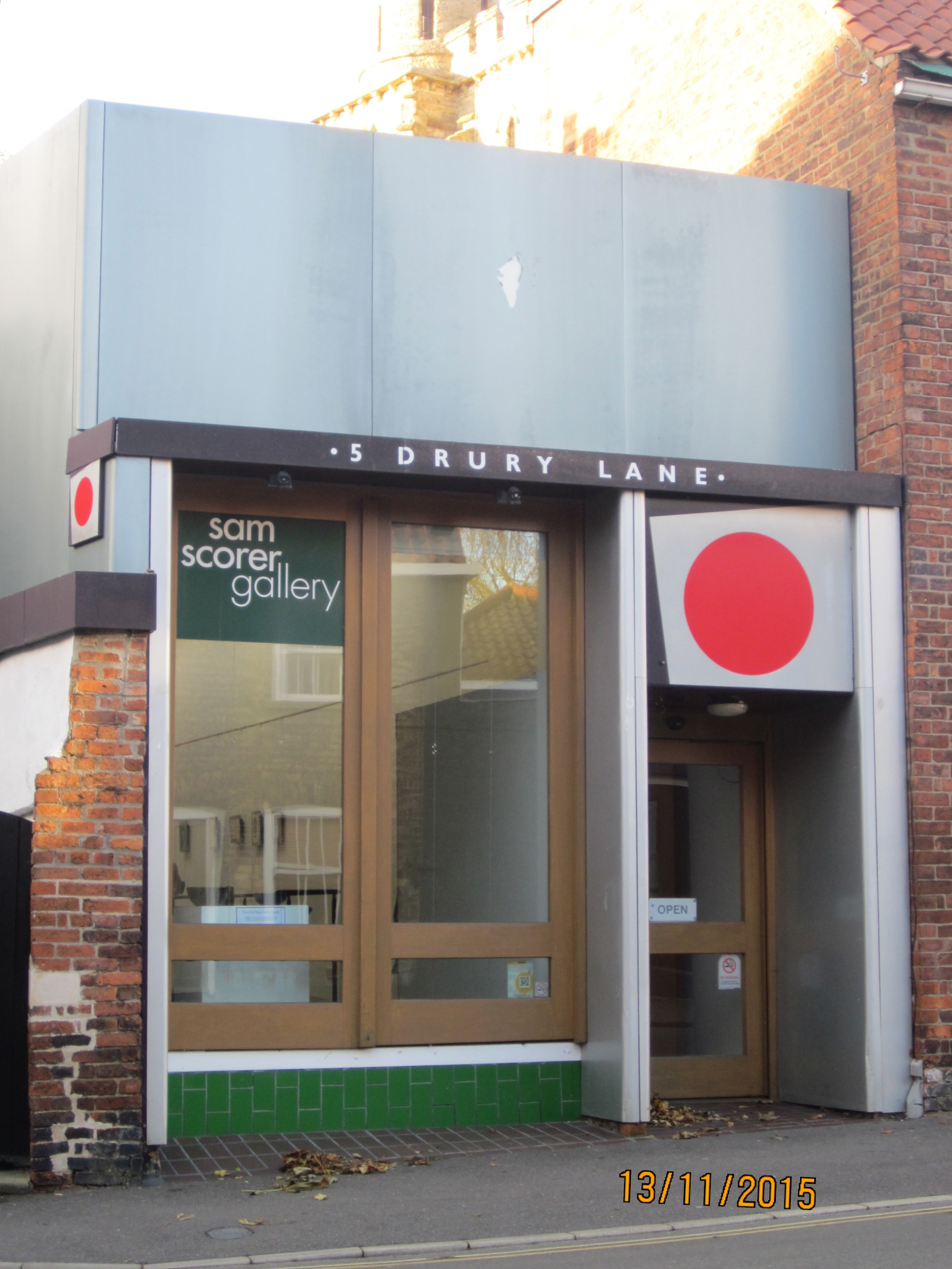
Sam Scorer Gallery, Drury Lane, Lincoln

- William Farr Church of England Comprehensive School (1952) Welton.
- Lacey Gardens Junior School (1953) Louth.
- House and Summerhouse for E. W. Scorer (1955) Lincoln.
- 7 Gibraltar Hill (1955) Lincoln. His own house.
- Extension to the Gartree Secondary Modern School (1956 and 1960) Tattershall, Lincolnshire.
- Scunthorpe Steelworks. Laboratory for Richard Thomas and Baldwins (1958) Redbourn Works. Described by Pevsner and Harris as "an interesting structure with fifteen concrete mushroom pillars. Hence the roof comes down in lobes" This included murals and designs for Plyglass panels by Tony Bartl. The building appears to have been demolished by 1989.
- Riddings Comprehensive School (1958), Scunthorpe. The classroom block linked by a vestibule to the dining room and gym. The kitchen and ancillary rooms are screened by an effective, very heavily rusticated or embossed wall. A tall watertower provides vertical emphasis
- Charnos factory (1959) Ilkeston. Lingerie factory featuring a tank tower that is thought to incorporate the first concrete hyperbolic paraboloid structure in the UK.
- Petrol station (1959–60) Markham Moor, on the A1.
- Lincolnshire Motor Company showrooms (1959–61), Brayford Pool, Lincoln. From about 1974 Lincolnshire Libraries headquarters and store. Now restaurants.
- St John the Baptist (1963), Ermine Estate, Lincoln.
- Lindum House, Montagu Road, Canwick. Converted into a house for Peter and Kari Wright, in 1969–70. Described as a "former Command Post, barely visible from the kerbside, nestling within an undulating 0.4-acre plot. Only its distinctive triangular ecclesiastical spire window peaks above the horizon. Internally the property has an expansive principal 31 ft (approx) reception room, kitchen/breakfast room, four bedrooms and bathroom".

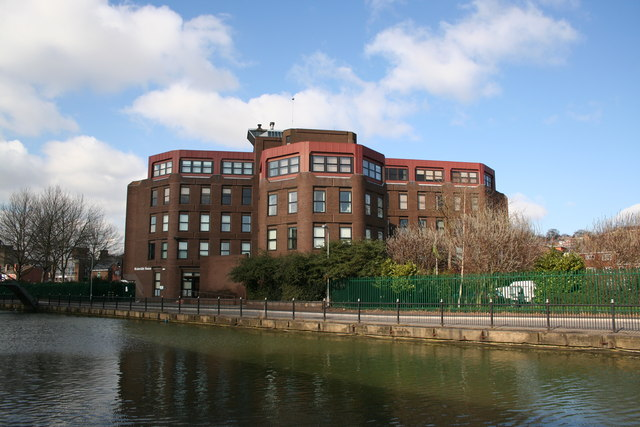
Waterside House, offices of the Environment Agency

- Barclays Bank (1968–70). Corner of the High Street with the Corn Hill, Lincoln. Tinted glass facades. By Clarke Hall, Scorer & Bright.
- Lucy Tower car-park (1973–74), Brayford Pool, Lincoln.
- Sports Centre (1974), North Hykeham, Lincoln.
- The Welding Institute, (1975) Abington, Cambridgeshire. Probably the Richard Weck building on Granta Park, a steel and plate glass structure with internal and external murals by Tony Bartl. This may have been recently demolished (2012–14), as, despite being in a conservation area, its significance was not appreciated.

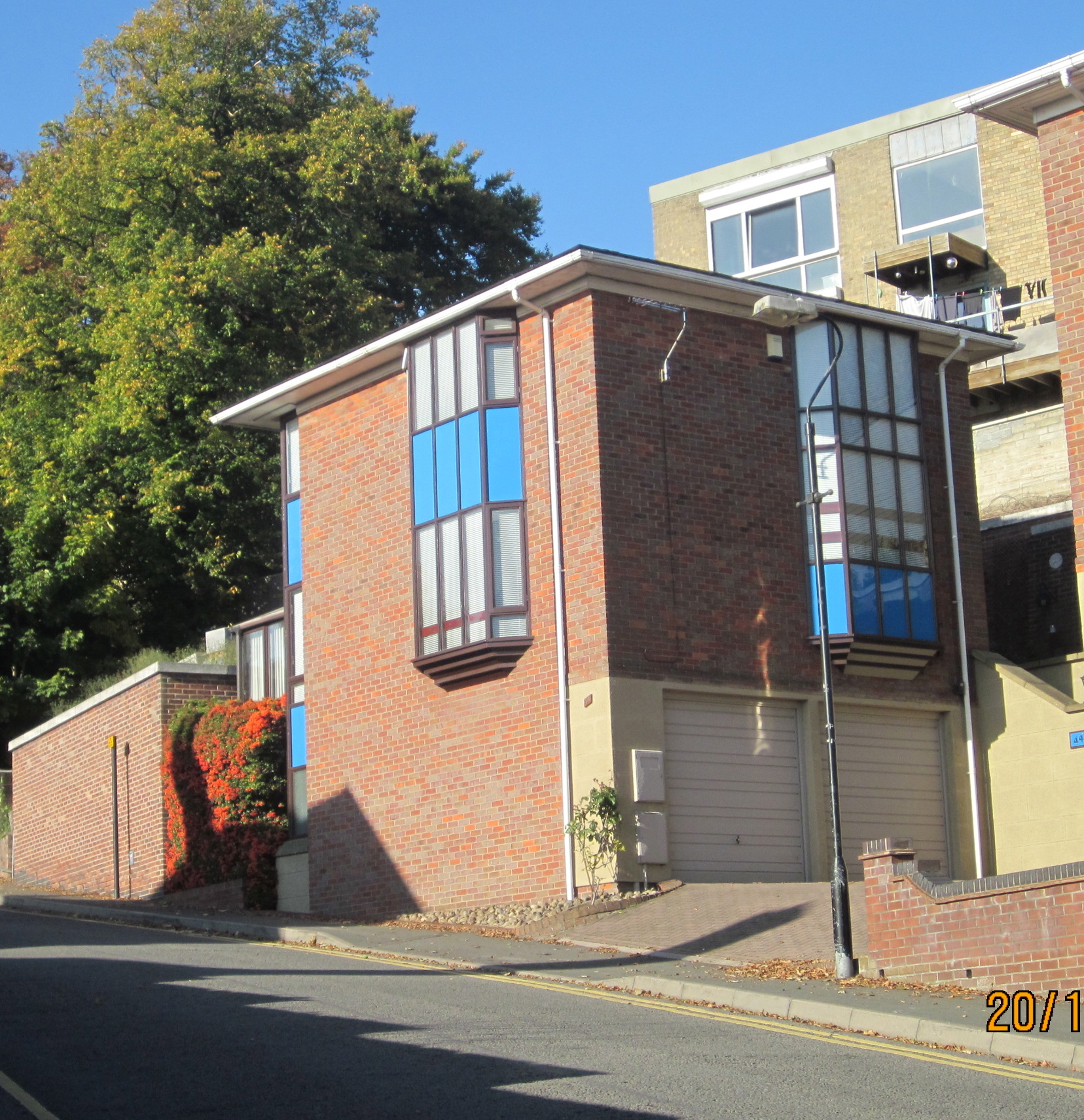
House on Spring Hill, Lincoln, designed by Sam Scorer

- Waterside House (1978–9), Waterside North, Lincoln. Environment Agency Building. Red brick on a concrete frame, with recessed mortar joints, detailed with curves and chamfers.

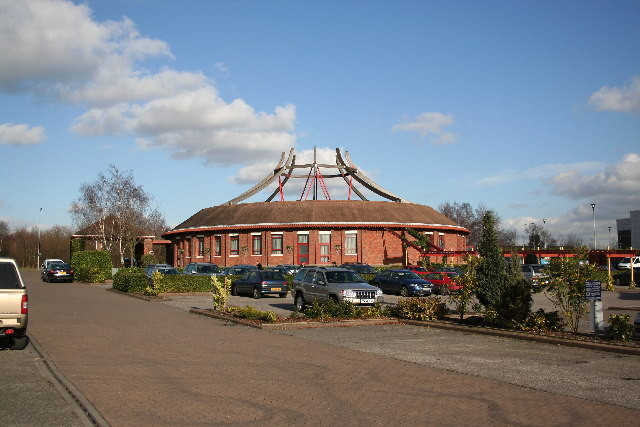
Damon's Diner 1987, Swallowbeck, Lincoln

- 1980s Designed two houses on Spring Hill, Lincoln for the building contractor, Richard Lucas Ltd.
- Southern Outfall Pumping Station (1987) Cleethorpes.
- Damon's Restaurant (1987–8) Swallowbeck on the junction with the Lincoln Western by-pass. An American burger bar. The up-turned roof structure represents ribs of beef.
- Roman Villa (1990s). House. Lincoln.
- Damon's Motel (1993) Swallowbeck.
- Sam Scorer Gallery, Drury Lane, Lincoln, (2000).

== Literature ==
- Antram N (revised), Pevsner N & Harris J, (1989), The Buildings of England: Lincolnshire, Yale University Press.

=== Architectural writing ===
- Kaye D. and Scorer S. (with Introduction and Gazetteer by David Robinson), Fowler of Louth: The Life and Works of James Fowler, Louth Architect 1828–1892, Louth Museum 1992.
- Scorer S. (introduction), (1990) The Victorian Facade: William Watkins and son, architects, Lincoln 1858–1918 Lincolnshire College of Art and Design. ISBN 0951634003. Booklet to accompany exhibition at the Usher Gallery, Lincoln.
