= Markham Moor Scorer Building =

Coordinates: 53.256875°N 0.927696°W

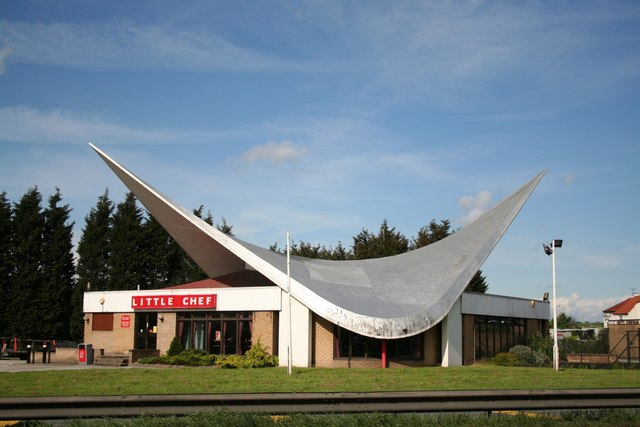
- The building as a Little Chef in 2006
- Alternative names: Markham Moor Filling Station Markham Moor Hypar Markham Moor Papilo

General information
- Location: Markham Moor junction services, A638 Markham Moor South; Retford; Nottinghamshire DN22 0QU
- Client: A.H.Turner Ltd
- Owner: Starbucks

Design and construction
- Architect: Sam Scorer
- Main contractor: Charles R. Price
- Known for: Hyperbolic Paraboloid roof shape

The building designed by Sam Scorer at the Markham Moor services (sometimes known as the Markham Moor Filling Station, Markham Moor Hypar or Markham Moor Papilo) is a Grade II listed building originally designed as a petrol station. It is beside the A1 south-bound at the Markham Moor junction services and was built between 1959 and 1960 with the aid of engineer Kalman Hajnal-Kónyi. It is currently a Starbucks.

== Design ==
Designed by Lincoln-based architect Sam Scorer, the original structure consisted only of one hyperbolic paraboloid to shelter a petrol station; the building underneath was a later addition. The petrol station was one of a series of buildings designed by Scorer which included hyperbolic structures. These structures (sometimes known as 'hypars') were experimental structures with the intention of making them appear to hover and also in this case a show of engineering efficiency, since the concrete roof structure is only 75mm thick.

The cantilever canopy is constructed using a shell concrete structure which forms a continuous plane developed from two parabolas inverted relative to each other at right angles. The canopy thus acts as two systems of arches with one set of arches under compression and the other under tension.

== Ownership ==
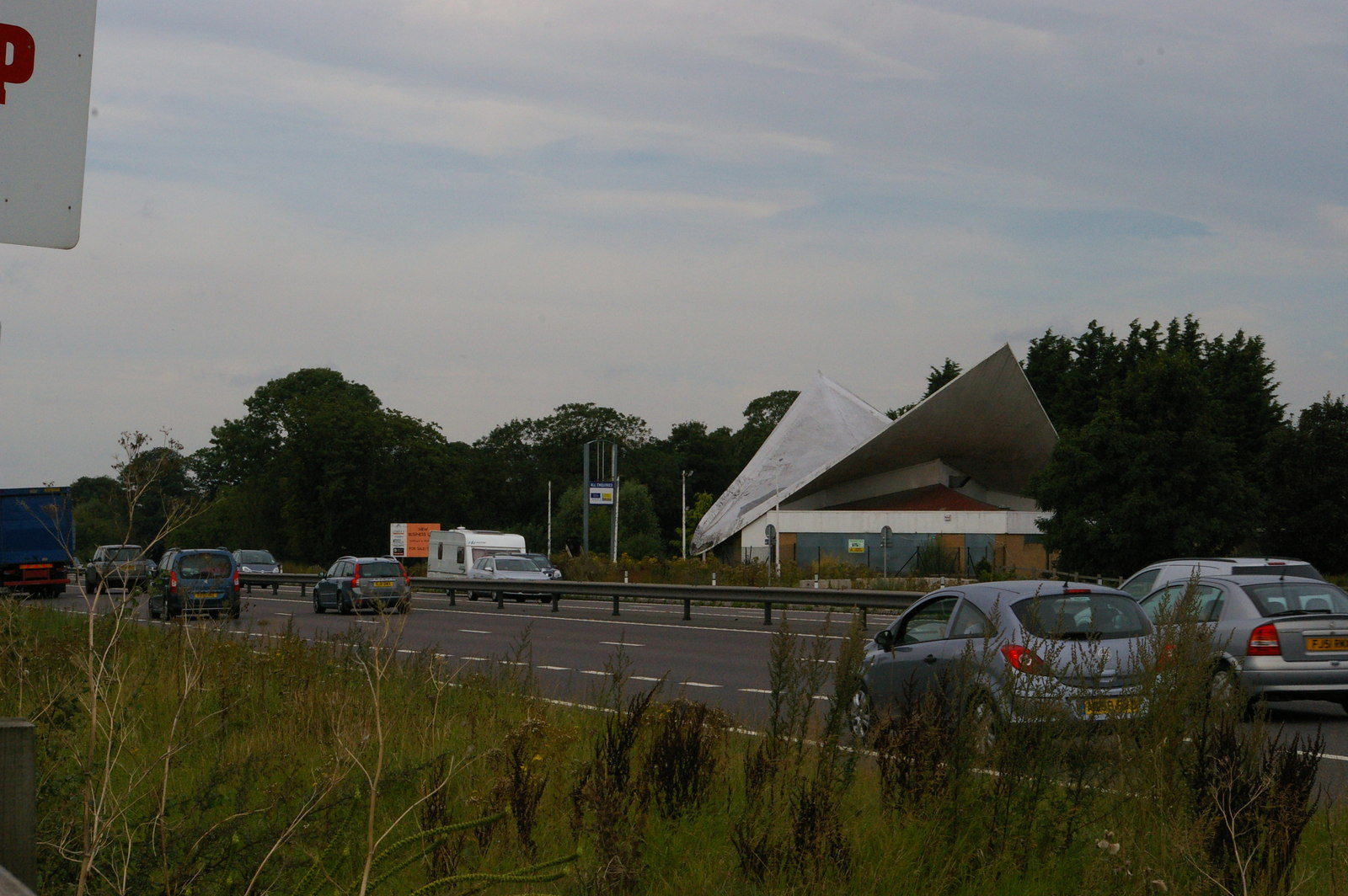
The building in 2012 while boarded up

=== Petrol station 1960–1982 ===
The building was designed and built as Markham Moor Filling Station, with planning from East Retford Rural District; the contractors were Charles R. Price, of 252 Bishopsgate. A NCK-Rapier 205 truck-mounted crane was employed to distribute the concrete over the roof. Charles R Price were bought by Harry Neal in 1962. It was opened when on the A614 in 1960, the recently-built West Drayton diversion, which had been constructed in 1957. It became the Retford bypass in August 1961.

It was operated by National Benzole from 1960 until it was taken over by Happy Eater in 1982.

While the canopy was designed as an architectural curiosity, it was also designed to catch the eye of a motorist, giving them plenty of time to pull into the petrol station.

It was first owned by A.H.Turner Ltd, vehicle mechanics, phone number Tuxford 215, who were main dealers for Wolseley and MG cars. A.H.Turner Ltd also later had a larger site at 23 Grove Street in Retford. Arthur Henry Turner formed the company on June 8 1936. In December 1947, he had sold the company to Hempsalls of East Markham. Arthur Henry Turner died around 1981. A.H.Turner Group collapsed in 1990. The chairman of the company was also the chairman of the North Nottinghamshire TEC.

It cost £4,500. In the 1960s it was owned by Ken Hempsall. In April 1962, it was featured on the ITV early evening television programme Showcase.

=== Happy Eater 1982–1996 ===
Bassetlaw Council gave permission to become a restaurant in February 1982, and full planning a month later. Allen Edward Jones, the managing director of Happy Eater attended a licences meeting at Retford Court House, on Exchange Street, in May 1982, to apply for a restaurant table licence, for selling alcohol. Happy Eater was headquartered in Epsom.

It held interviews for staff in early June 1982. It converted to a 'Happy Eater Family Restaurant' in August 1982, which seated 80 people, being open from 7.30am to 10pm. It was the 26th Happy Eater.

The restaurant manager was Mrs Mary Crookes. The phone number was Gamston 712. The beefburgers were supplied by St Ives Food Products, of Cambridgeshire. It served Seagram Table Wine. In 1986 the manager was 27 year-old Ray Whytock, of Retford.

==== Other Happy Eater venues nearby ====
A corresponding Happy Eater opened northbound at Elkesley, on 4 July 1985, which also had a table licence; it had closed by 1996, and was raided by Nottinghamshire Police Vice Squad on 14 May 1998, resulting in a conviction for the Chinese-Italian owner at Nottingham Court in late June 1999. The roadside establishment had been known as 'Angels Health Club' from March 1998.

Another Happy Eater was planned to open at Ollerton at the Crossroads Filling Station on the A614 by the end of October 1985, but the scheme was rejected by Newark and Sherwood district planners in April 1986.

==== Incidents ====
On 18 February 1985, two large tyres from an articulated wagon came free from the vehicle. One crossed the carriageways, bounced over a car in the restaurant car park, and hit a restaurant window. Police estimated the impact speed to have been 80mph. It injured people in the restaurant.

On 8 July 1993 it was officially visited by Sir Andrew Buchanan, 5th Baronet, the Lord Lieutenant of Nottinghamshire.

=== Little Chef 1996–2012 ===
Around 1996 the structure was converted to a Little Chef restaurant, as Trusthouse Forte had been taken over in early 1996.

In 2003 the Highways Agency proposed plans for a flyover which would involve the demolition of the Little Chef, however the plans were later revised after many objections from the residents of nearby Elkesley and those interested in the welfare of the building, including improved access to the site. The Little Chef on this site closed in 2012.

=== Disused 2012–2019 ===
The building was disused between 2012 and 2019. On 27 March 2012, shortly after the Little Chef restaurant closed, Historic England awarded Grade II listed building status to the canopy to the former petrol station and its structural supports.

=== Starbucks 2019–present ===
In 2019 the site was taken over by Starbucks. The building and roof were renovated and converted into a café and drive-through.

== See also ==
- Googie architecture
- Listed buildings in West Drayton, Nottinghamshire
