= Ermine, Lincoln =

Suburb of Lincoln, Lincolnshire, England

Coordinates: 53.247140°N 0.536914°W

Ermine
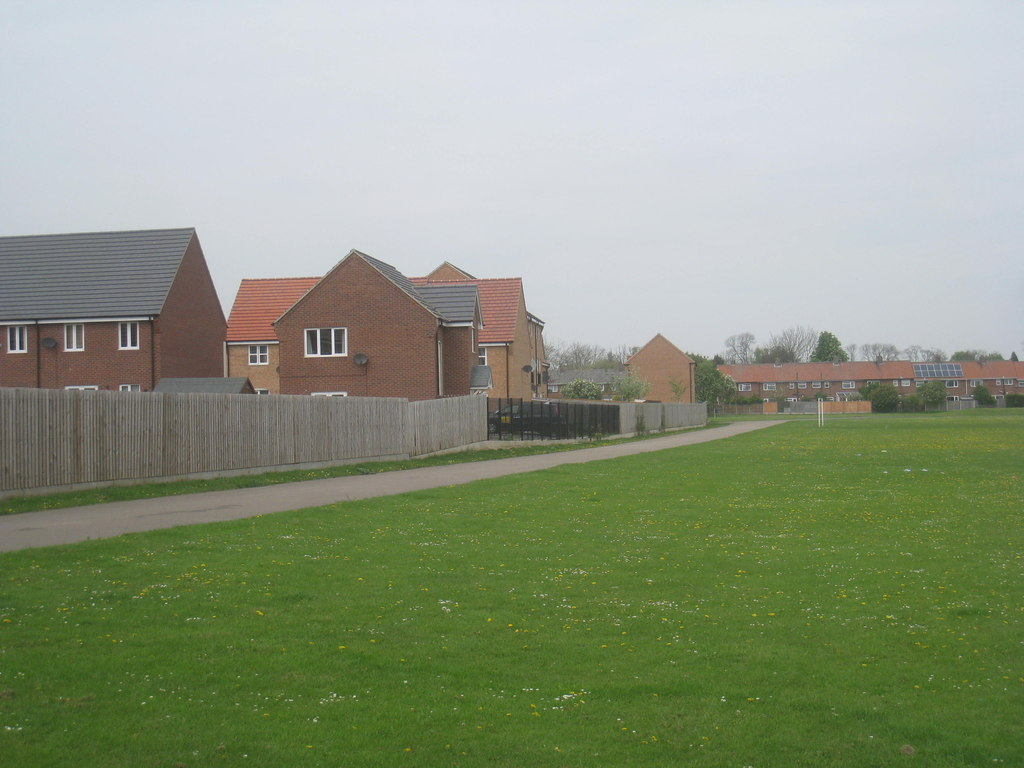
- Ermine Estate, Lincoln

- Location within Lincolnshire
- Population: (2021)
- District: City of Lincoln
- Shire county: Lincolnshire
- Region: East Midlands
- Country: England
- Sovereign state: United Kingdom
- Post town: LINCOLN
- Postcode district: LN1
- Dialling code: 01522
- Police: Lincolnshire
- Fire: Lincolnshire
- Ambulance: East Midlands
- UK Parliament: Lincoln

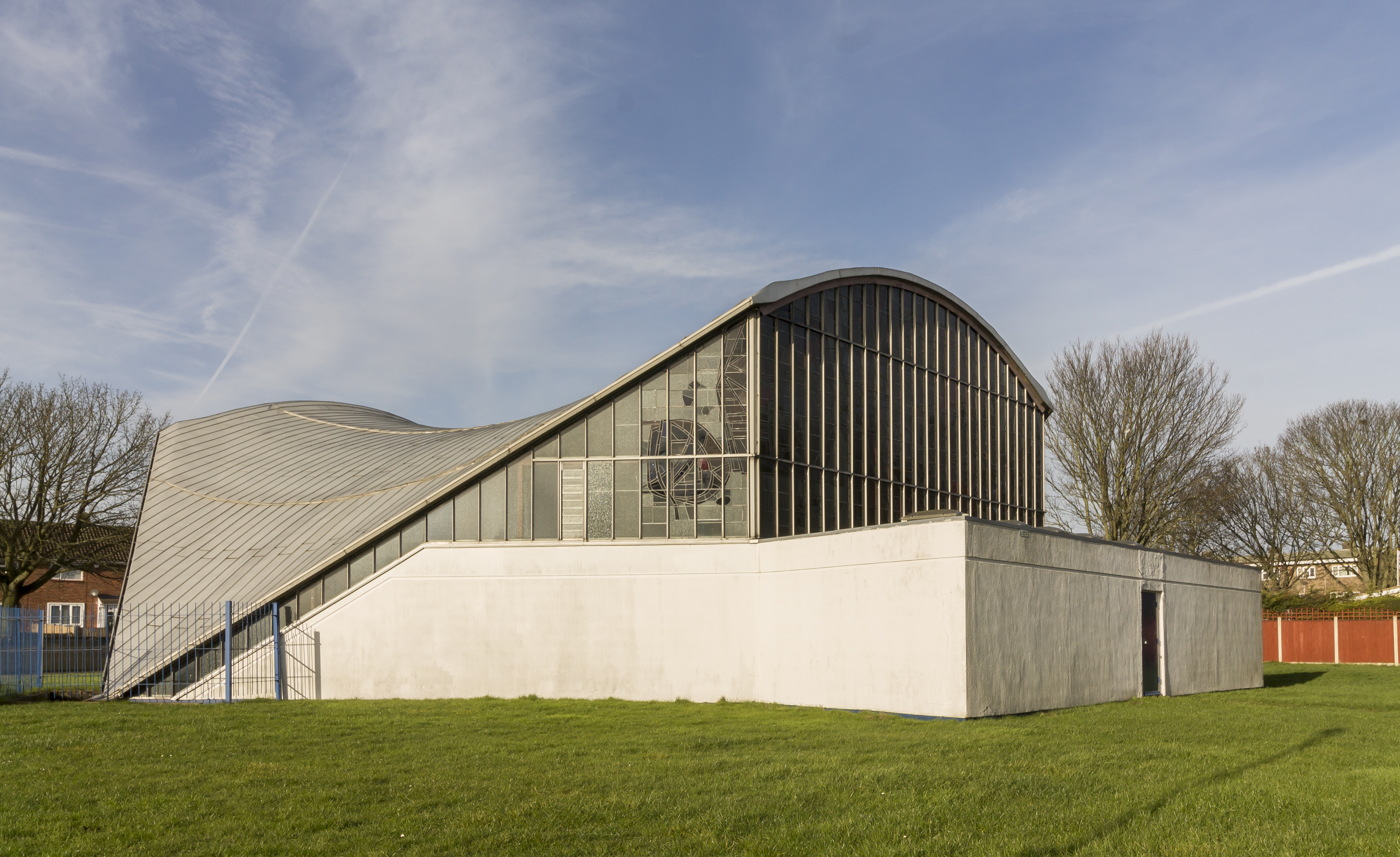
St John the Baptist's Church

Ermine is an inner-city suburb and housing estate of Lincoln in Lincolnshire, England. Located to the north of the city, it is named after Ermine Street. The area is one of the city's largest suburbs and was at one point the roughest area of Lincoln. It includes the neighbourhoods of Ermine East and Ermine West.
