= Tony Bartl =

Czech-British artist

- Born: Antonin Karel Bartl; 1912
- Died: 23 December 1998 (aged 85–86); Probably Lincoln
- Education: Prague Academy of Art
- Known for: Painting, Drawing, Murals

Antonin Karel Bartl or Tony Bartl (1912–23 December 1998) was a Czech artist who in 1947 came to Britain and established himself as an artist, through his connections with Dr Richard Weck, his brother in law, who became Director of The Welding Institute. In 1948 he joined the staff of Lincoln College of Art. In 1972 he arranged a major exhibition at the Usher Gallery, Lincoln of the works of John Piper and his artwork and mosaics were widely used to decorate a number of public buildings and on these projects he worked closely with the Lincoln architect Sam Scorer.

== Early life ==
Antonin Bartl was born in 1912, in Cheb in the western part of Bohemia which was predominantly German speaking. His father was a bespoke tailor and was like many in the area, to become a Nazi supporter. His mother was a painter, who designed and embroidered her own clothes. Tony graduated from the Academy of Fine Arts, Prague where he was taught by Oskar Kokoschka and was influenced by German Expressionist and Austrian Secession painters such as Otto Dix, Gustav Klimt, Paula Modersohn-Becker and Otto Mueller. The influence of the Viennese Hagenbund school of art can also be seen in his work. He developed strong communist sympathies, presumably in reaction to the views of his father.

== Move to England and Lincoln College of Art ==
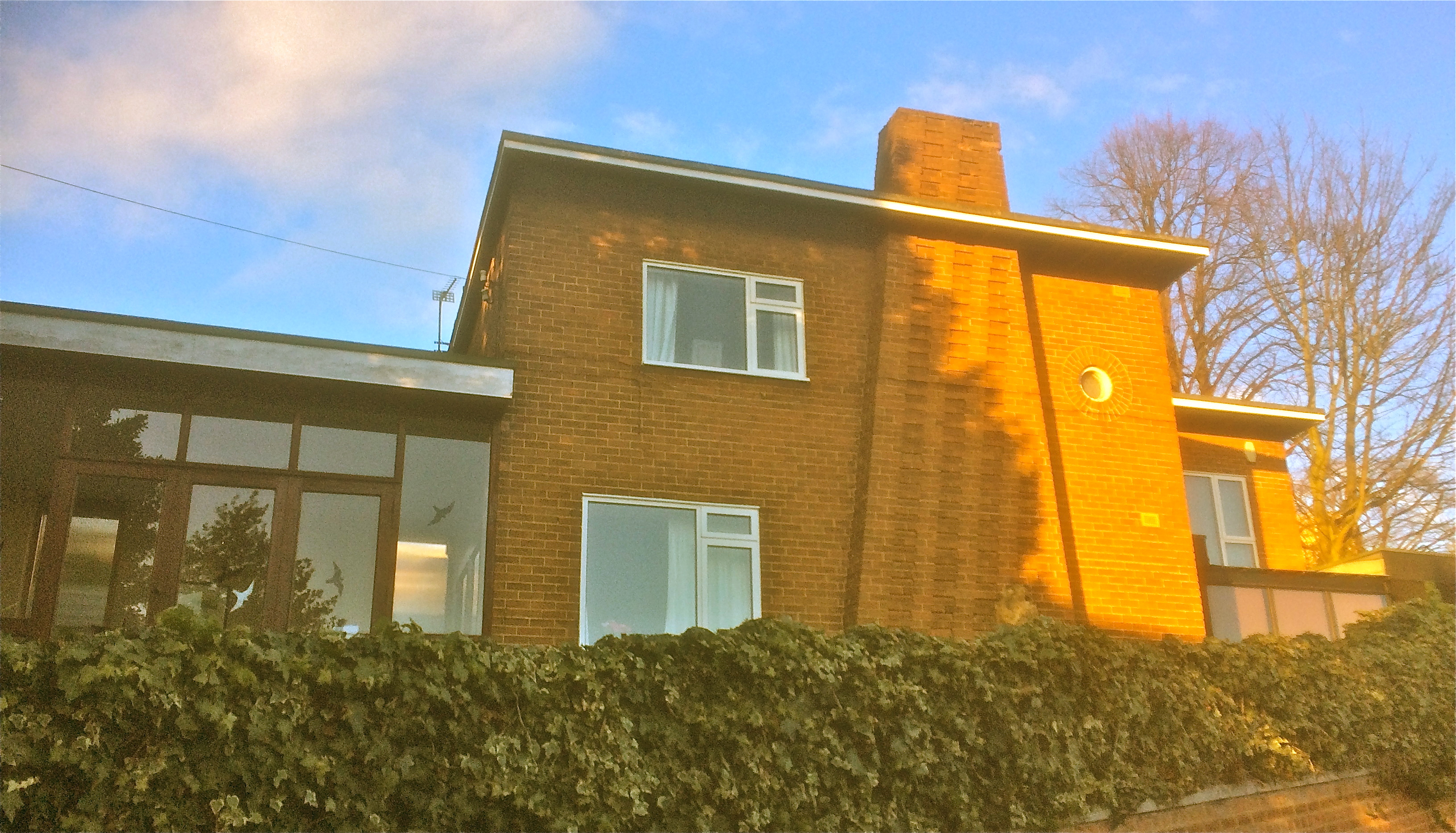
5 Gibralter Hill Lincoln, by Edward Alban, 1955

His brother-in-law, Dr Richard Weck, was instrumental in getting Tony Bartl to England on a visa through the Arts Council in 1947. On arrival, Tony stayed with his sister Katie and Richard in Weybridge at a refugee camp run by Dame Ethel Locke King, whose husband established Brooklands Racetrack. They were then to move to Abington Hall, outside Cambridge and in 1948, Marchbank Salmon, the Principal of the Lincoln College of Art invited him to become a lecturer. In 1955 he had a house built at 5 Gibraltar Hill to designs by the architect Edward Albarn, a conscientious objector, who was a member of a pacifist community based at Holton cum Beckering, near Wragby. Albarn was Head of the School of Architecture at Lincoln College of Art.

== Bartl and Scorer ==
Sam Scorer, appears to have worked with Tony Bartl on a number of architectural projects. Scorer was a Lincoln architect who had read Mechanical Engineering at Cambridge and also lived on Gibraltar Hill in Lincoln. These included murals and designs for Plyglass panels for Richard Thomas and Baldwins, Scunthorpe. This was probably the laboratory for Richard Thomas and Baldwins (1958) Redbourn Works. Described by Pevsner and Harris as "an interesting structure with fifteen concrete mushroom pillars. Hence the roof comes down in lobes". It appears that it was demolished by 1989.

== Exhibitions ==
Bartl exhibited in Liverpool at the John Moores Awards and at the Bridlesmith Gate Gallery, Nottingham. Also in Leicester, Birmingham, Lincoln, London, with solo shows in Cambridge, Nottingham and Lincoln.

== Public Collections ==
- Usher Art Gallery, Lincoln.
