= Saddle roof =

Type of roof structure

The hyperbolic paraboloid is a doubly ruled surface and thus can be used to construct a saddle roof from straight beams.

A saddle roof is a hyperbolic paraboloid structure used as a roof. The form follows a convex curve about one axis and a concave curve about the other.

It is easily constructed from straight sections of lumber, steel, or other conventional materials. The saddle roof may also be formed as a tensegrity structure.

The term is used because the form resembles the shape of a saddle. Mathematically, a saddle shape contains at least one saddle point.

The historical meaning is a synonym for a gable roof, particularly a dual-pitched roof on a tower, also called a pack-saddle roof.

== Gallery ==
Gallery of hyperbolic paraboloid structures used as a roof

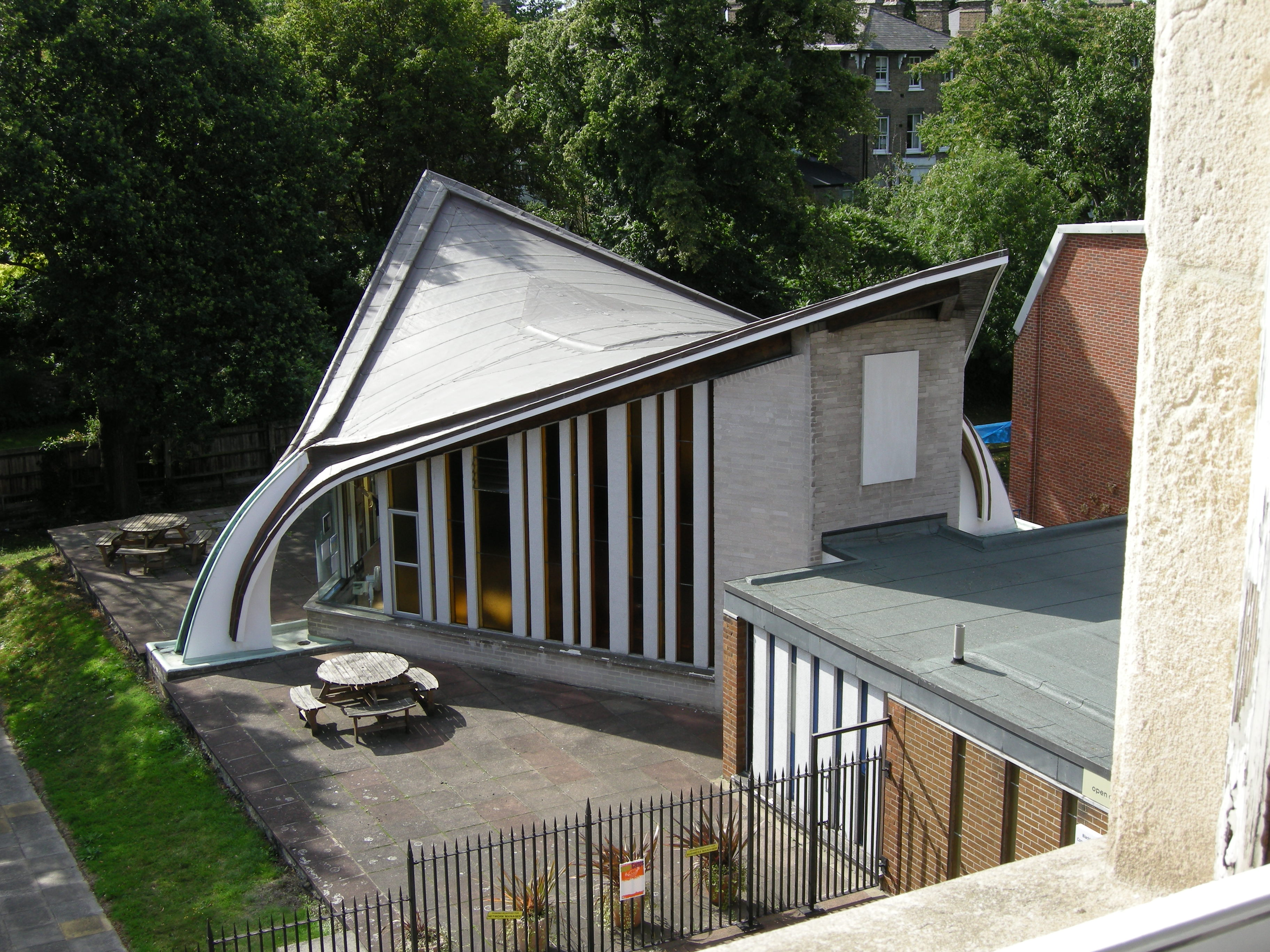
A hyperbolic paraboloid saddle roof: Church Army Chapel, Blackheath

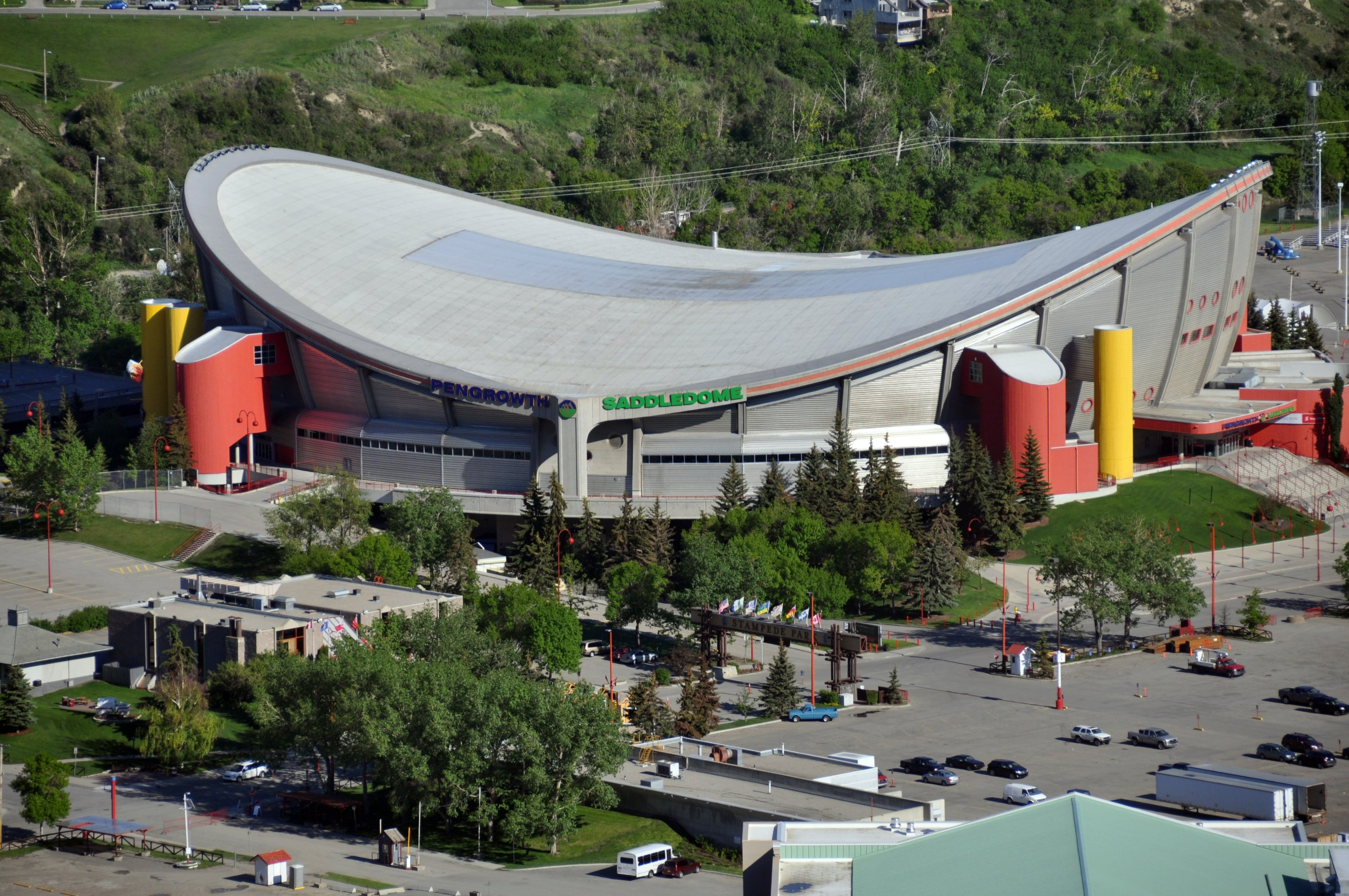
A hyperbolic paraboloid saddle roof: The Scotiabank Saddledome in Calgary, 1983

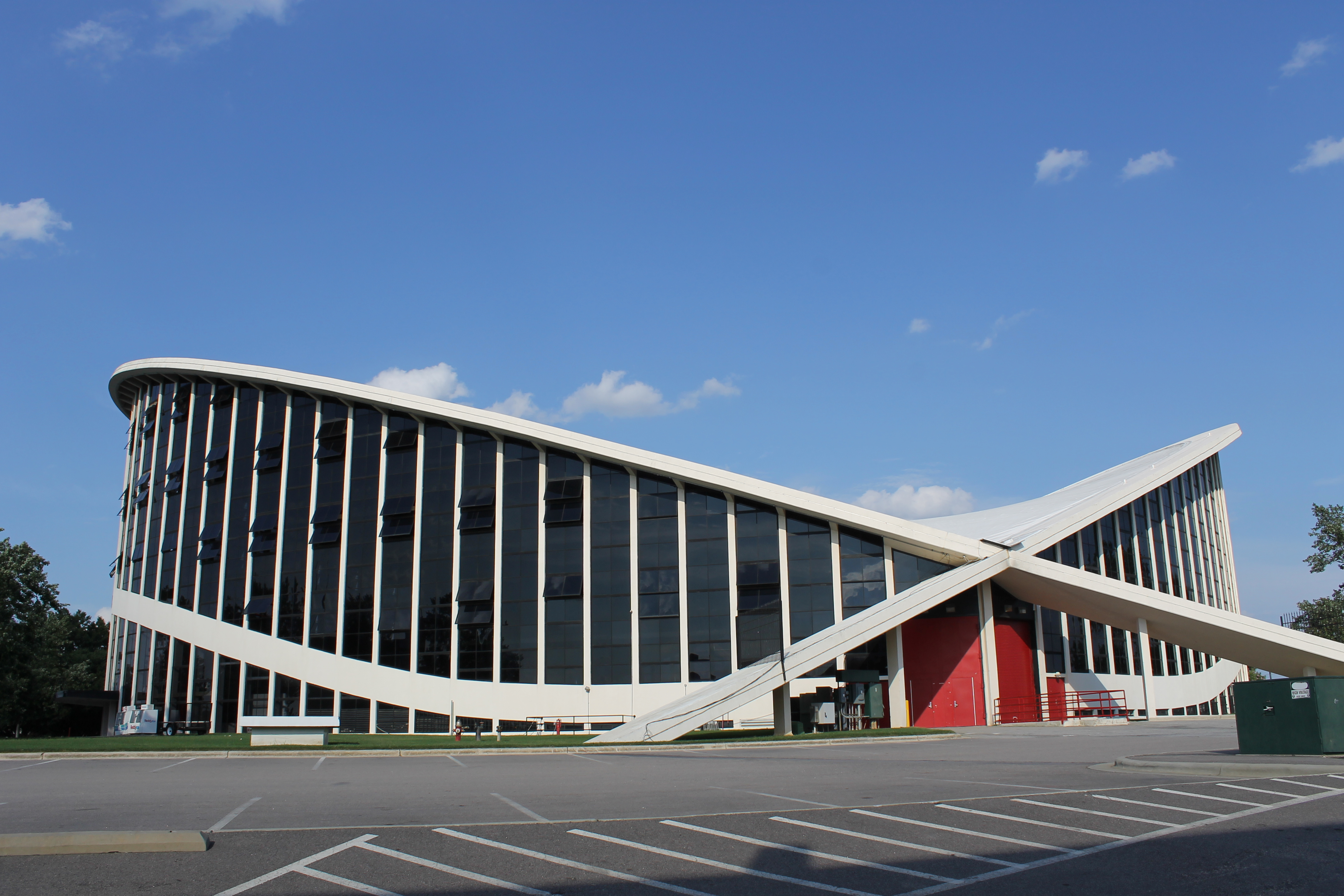
Dorton Arena designed by Maciej Nowicki, Raleigh, North Carolina, United States, 1952

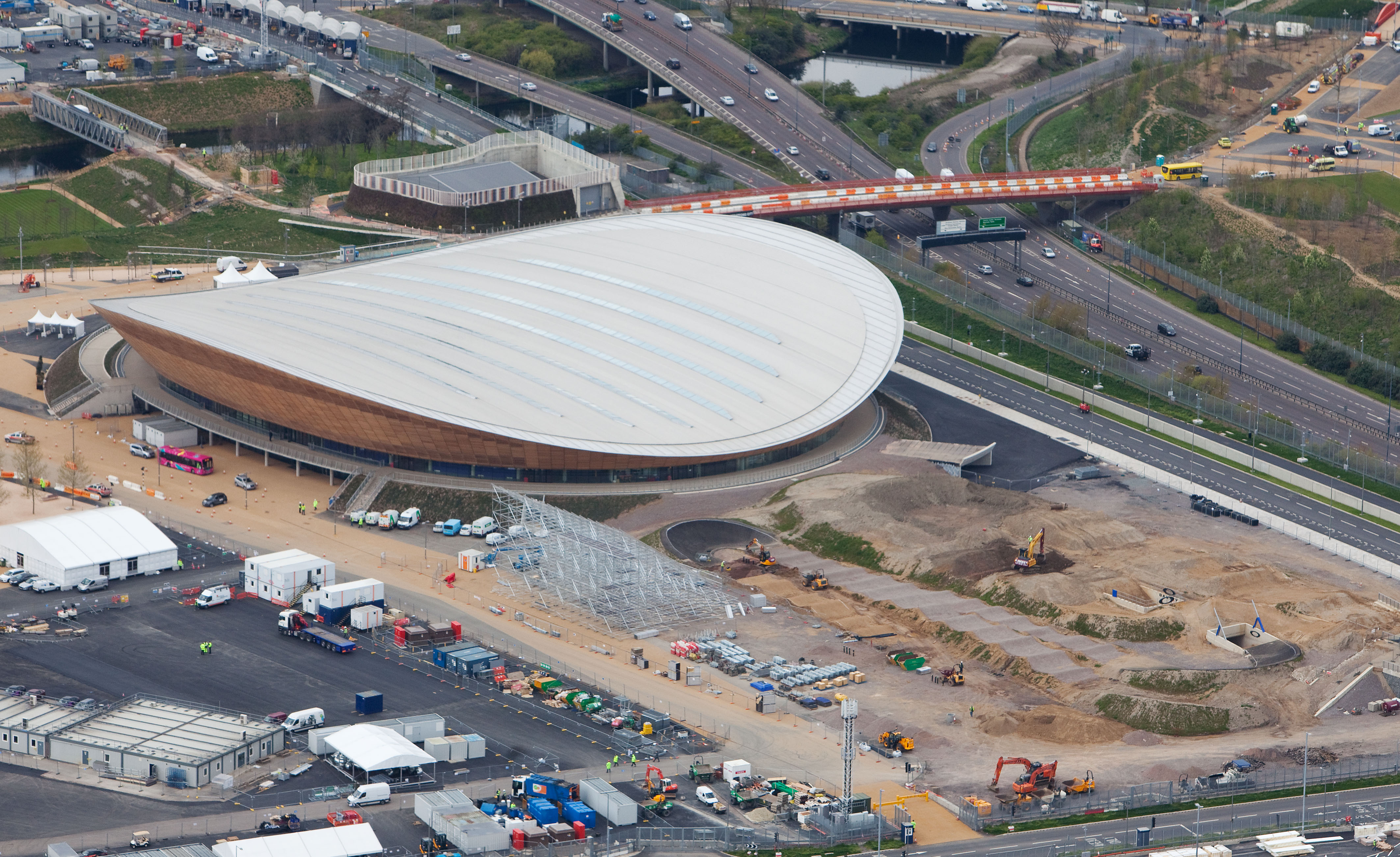
A hyperbolic paraboloid saddle roof: the London Velopark

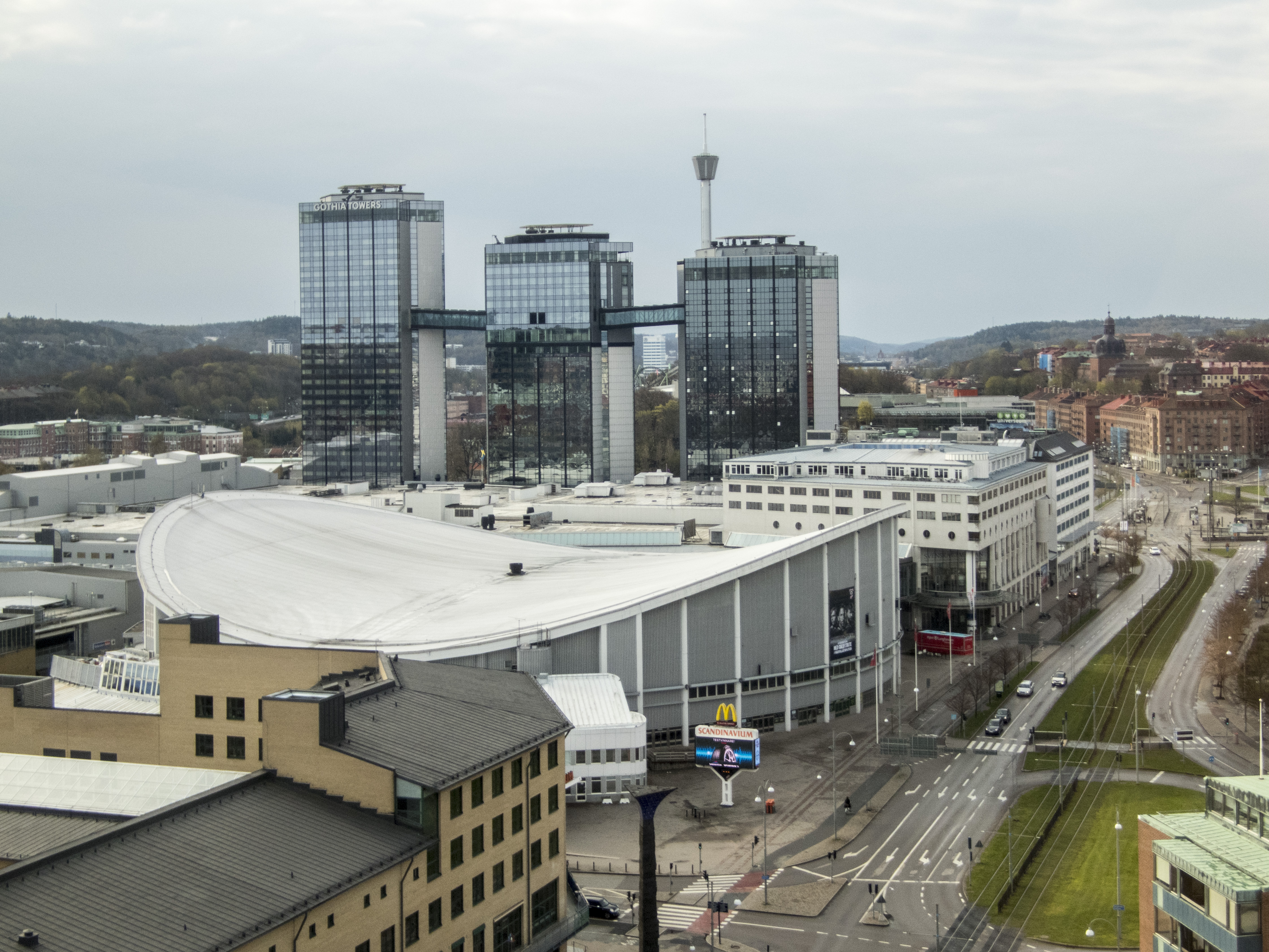
A hyperbolic paraboloid saddle roof: Scandinavium

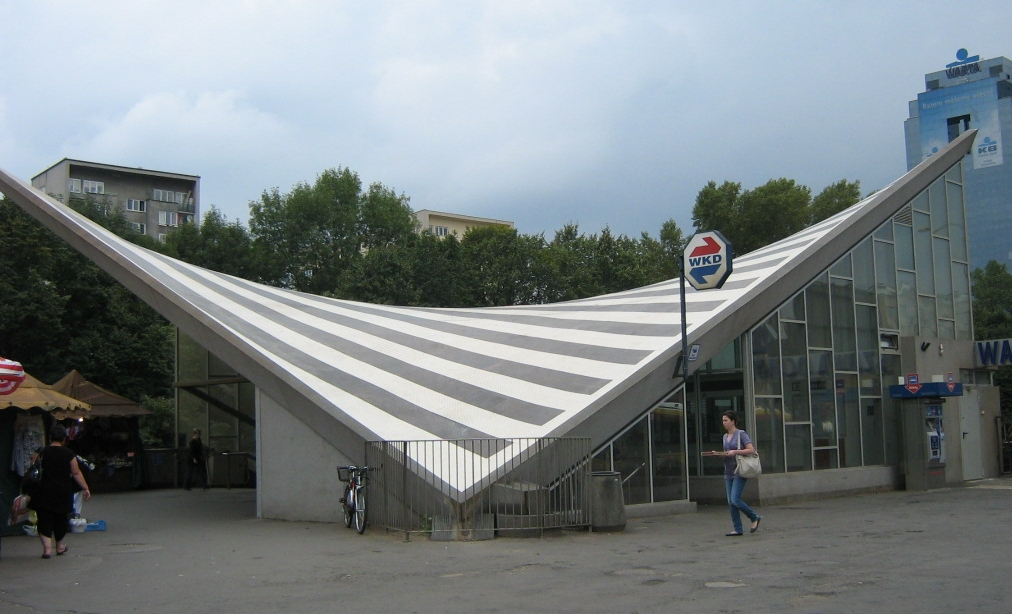
A hyperbolic paraboloid roof of Warszawa Ochota railway station in Warsaw, Poland, 1962

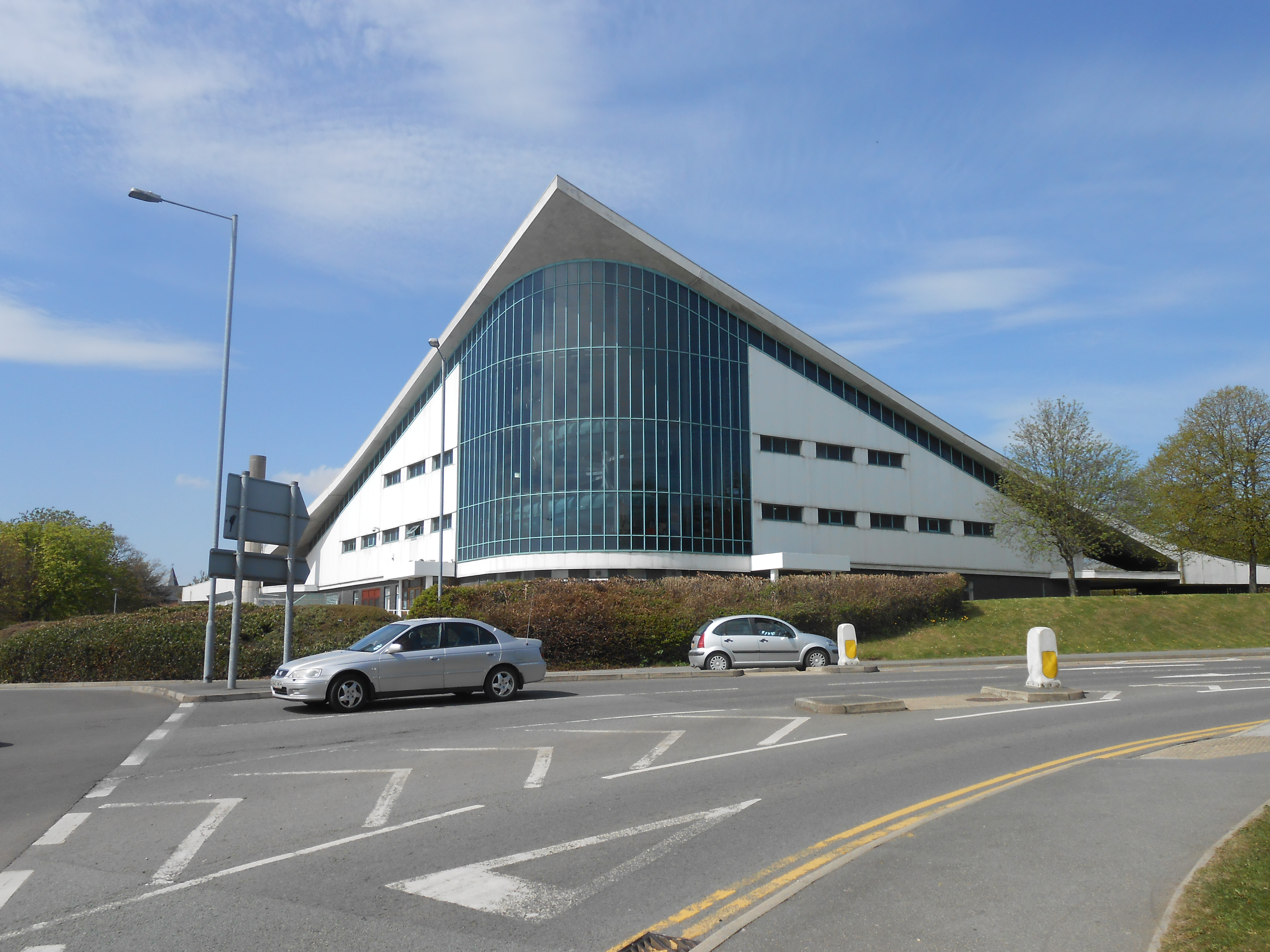
Wrexham Swimming Baths, now Wrexham Waterworld Leisure and Activity Centre, features a hyperbolic paraboloid roof in Wrexham, Wales, United Kingdom, 1969

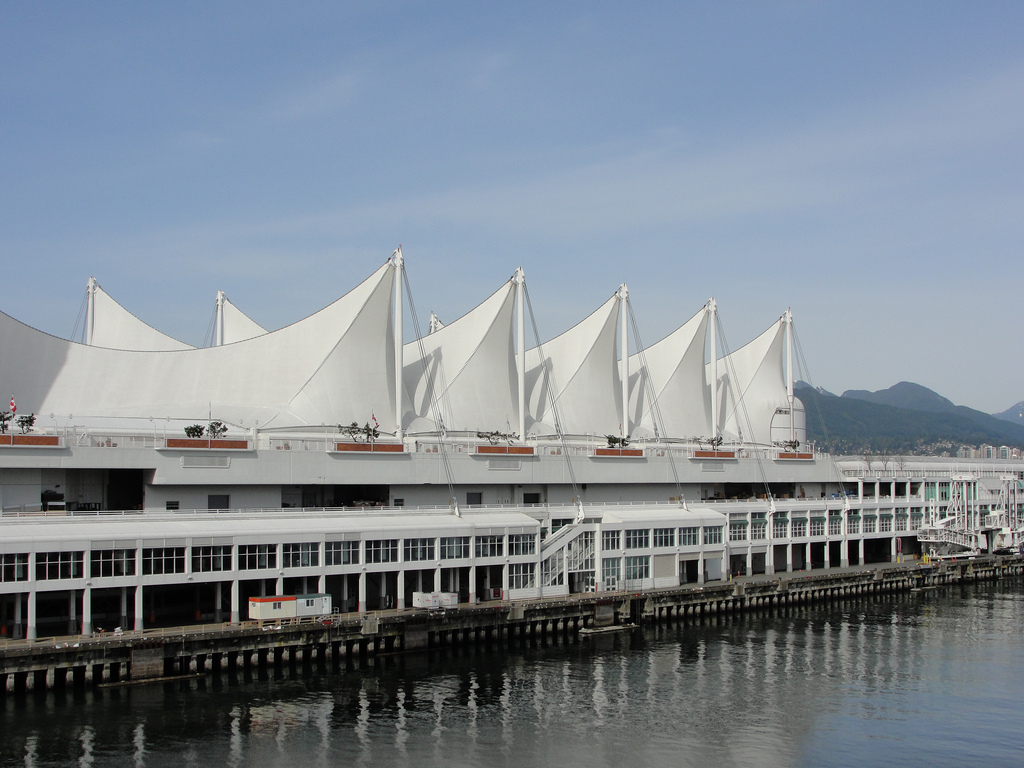
Multi-semi-hyperbolic-paraboloid roofs on Canada Place, Vancouver, Canada

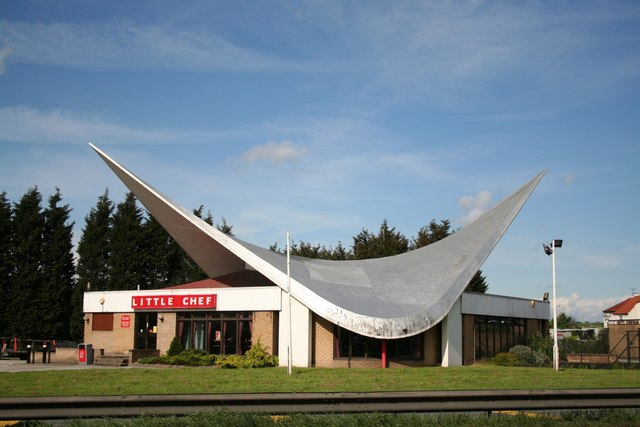
Markham Moor Service Station roof, Nottinghamshire, United Kingdom, 1959-60

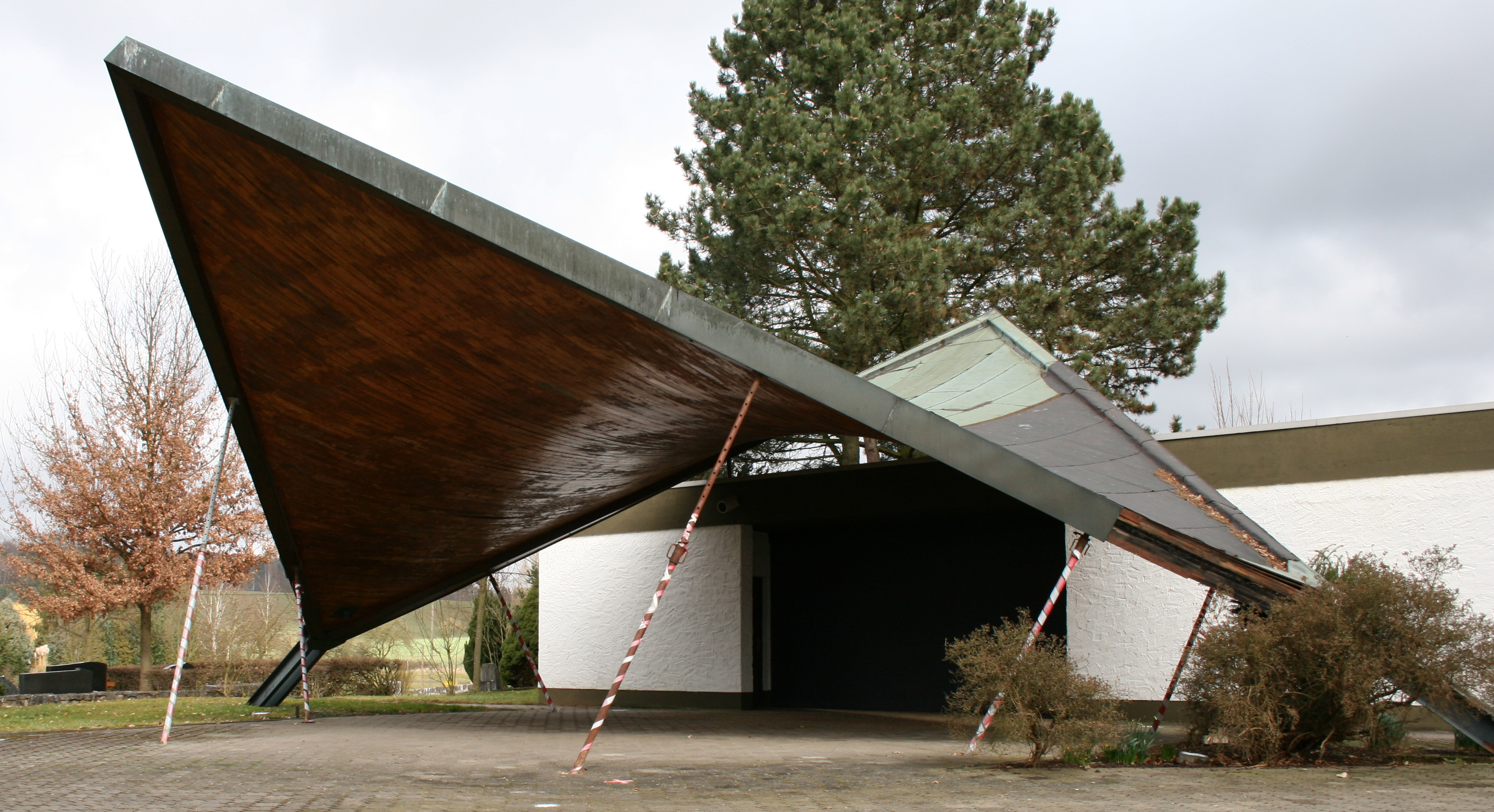
Schupbach cemetery hall, Germany

STL hyperbolic paraboloid model

=== Other examples ===
- Philips Pavilion Expo '58, Brussels (1958)
- IIT Delhi - Dogra Hall Roof
- St. Mary's Cathedral, Tokyo, Japan (1964)
- St Richard's Church, Ham, in Ham, London, England (1966)
- Cathedral of Saint Mary of the Assumption, San Francisco, California, US (1971)
- Scotiabank Saddledome in Calgary, Alberta, Canada (1983)
- Scandinavium in Gothenburg, Sweden (1971)
- L'Oceanogràfic in Valencia, Spain (2003)
- London Velopark, England (2011)
- Waterworld Leisure & Activity Centre, Wrexham, Wales (1970)
- Markham Moor Service Station roof, A1(southbound), Nottinghamshire, England
- Cafe "Kometa", Sokol district, Moscow, Russia (1960). Architect V.Volodin, engineer N.Drozdov. Demolished.
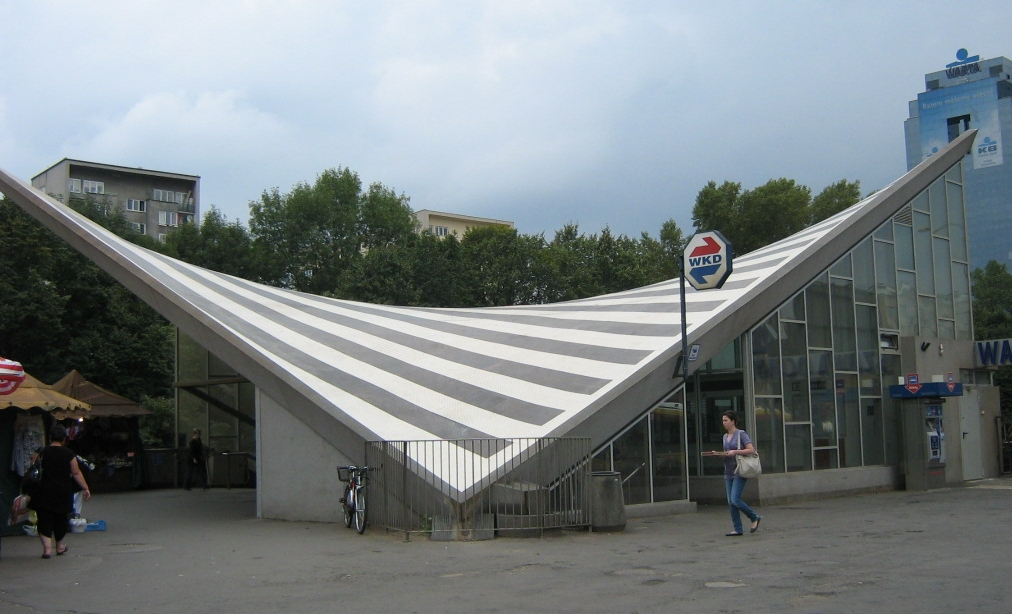
Warszawa Ochota railway station, an example of a hyperbolic paraboloid structure

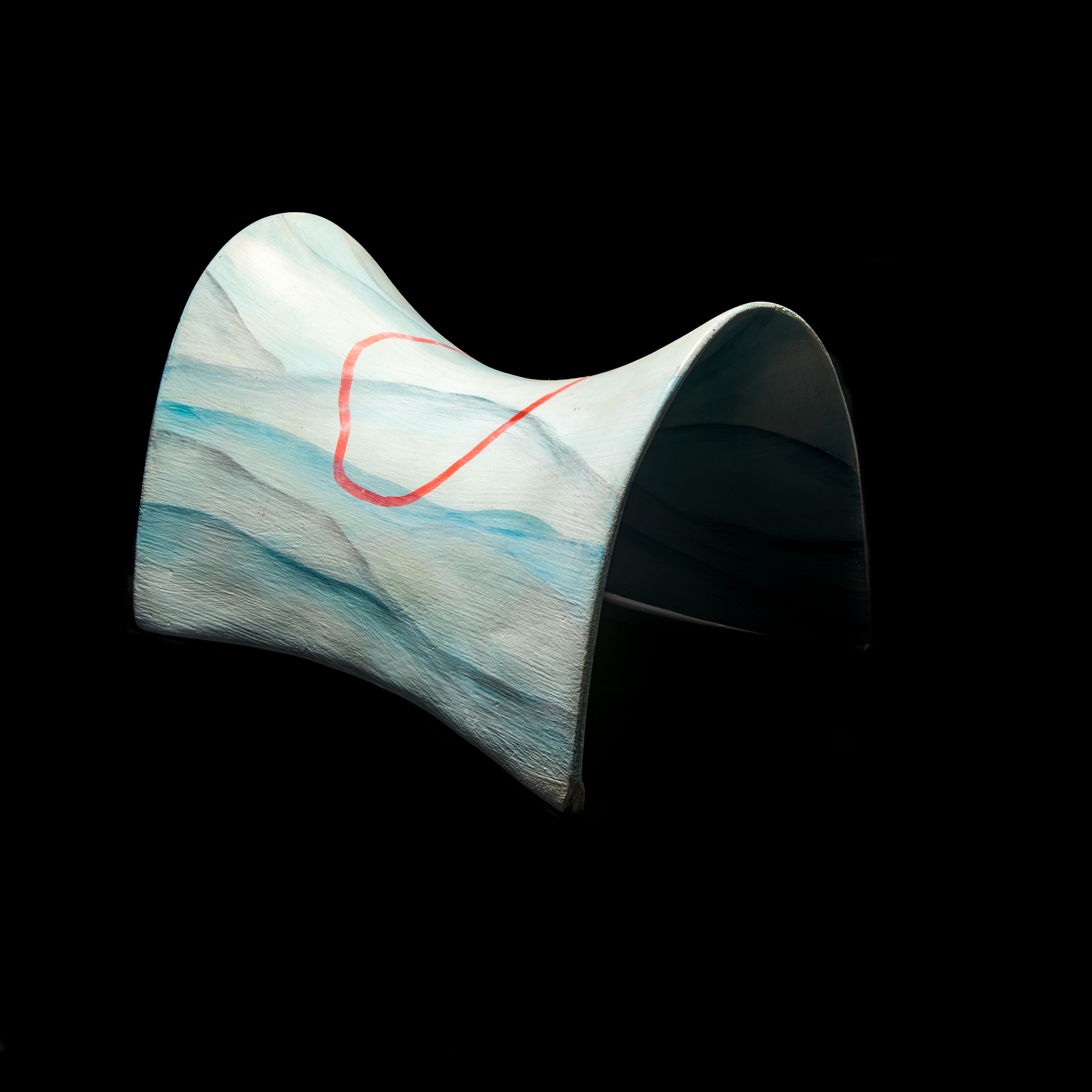
Surface illustrating a hyperbolic paraboloid

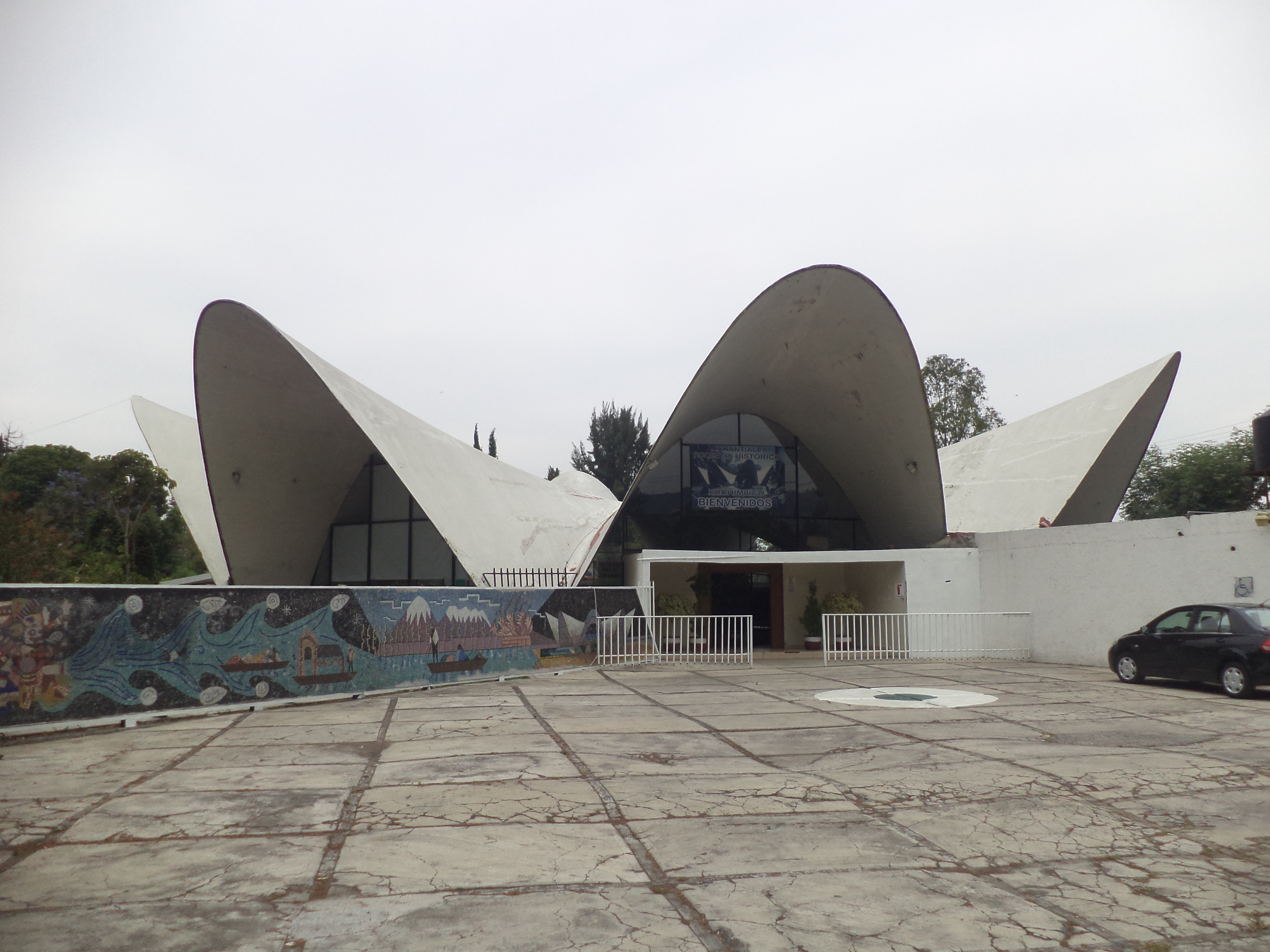
Restaurante Los Manantiales, Xochimilco, Mexico

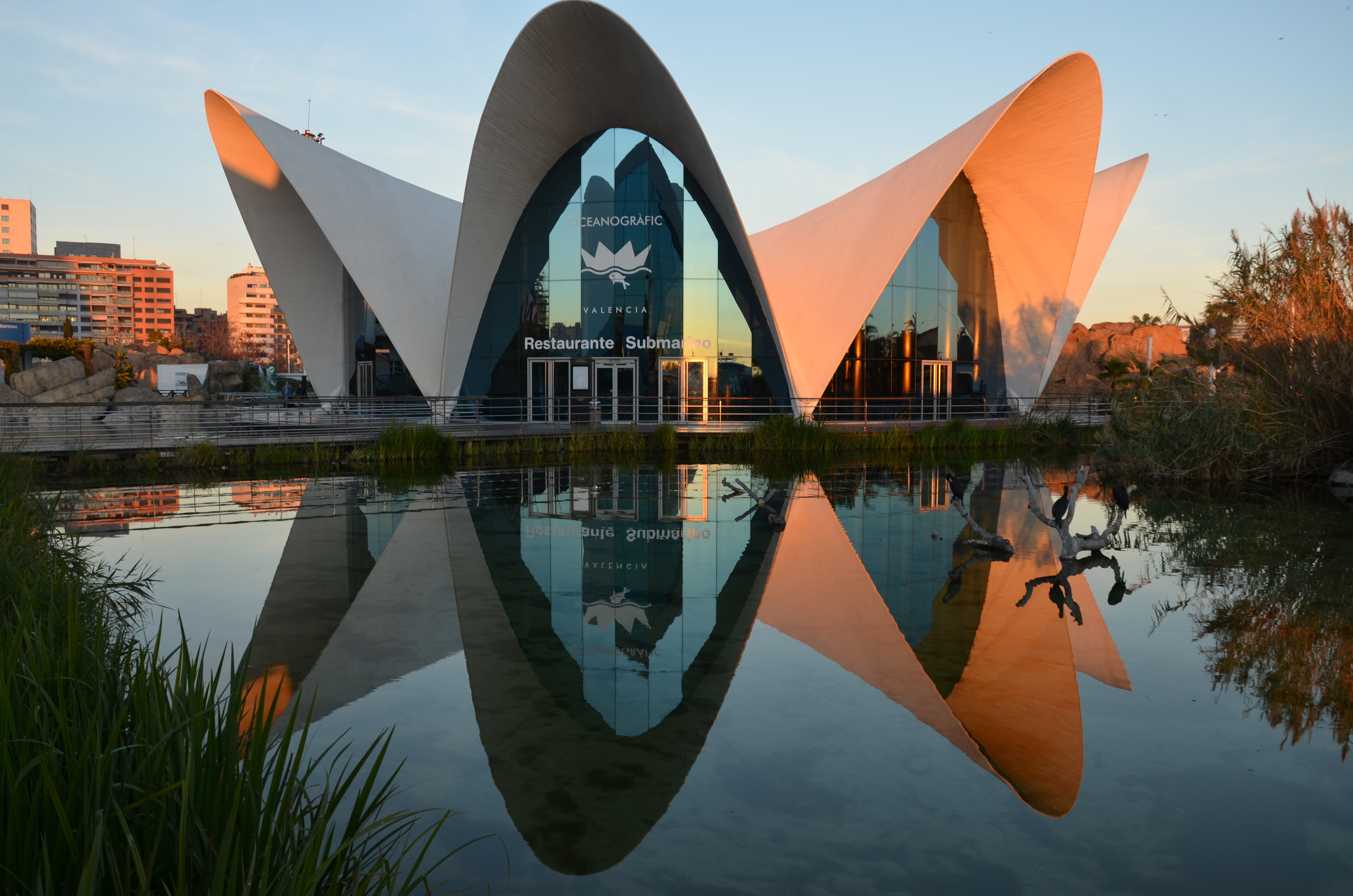
Hyperbolic paraboloid thin-shell roofs at L'Oceanogràfic, Valencia, Spain (taken 2019)

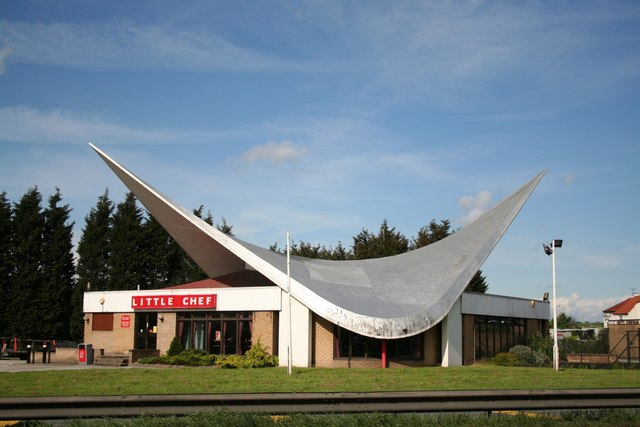
Markham Moor Service Station roof, Nottinghamshire (2009 photo)

== See also ==
- Sagrada Família
- eight hyperbolic parabolas rise to form the roof of Cathedral of Saint Mary of the Assumption and St. Mary's Cathedral, Tokyo.
- Hyperboloid structure
- List of hyperboloid structures
- Metro San Lázaro
- Xavier University
