= William Watkins (architect) =

English architect (1834–1926)

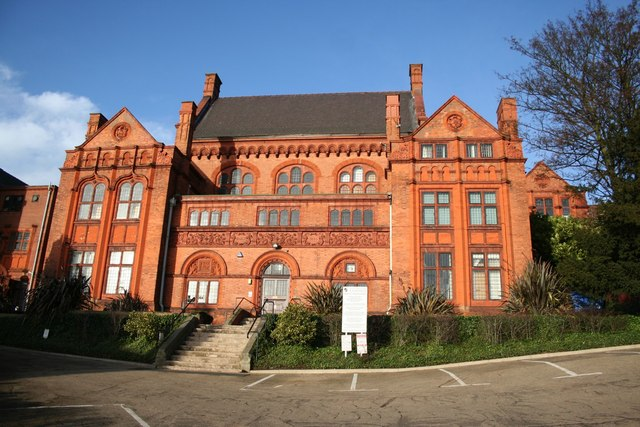
- Christ's Hospital Girls School, Lincoln
- Born: 1834; Rushock, nr. Droitwich, Worcestershire
- Died: 1926 (aged 91–92); Lincoln
- Education: Articled to Henry Day of Worcester 1854–59
- Occupation: Architect
- Buildings: Christ's Hospital Girls School, Lincoln

William Watkins (1834–1926) was an architect who worked in Lincoln, England, and is particularly noted for his Terracotta Revival Architecture.

== Career ==
Watkins was articled to the Worcester architect Henry Day between 1854 and 1859, and he then worked as principal assistant to the Lincoln architect Henry Goddard between 1860 and 1864. He set up his own practice at 200 High Street, Lincoln in 1864 and was living at Leyland House Lincoln in 1881. Between 1877 and 1883 he was in partnership with William Scorer (architect). Watkins and Scorer were to move their practice around 1871 to St Edmond's Chambers, on the corner of Bank Street with Silver Street, a building that was designed by William Scorer. Two of Watkin's sons, William Gregory Watkins and Henry (or Harry) Garnham Watkins also became architects. William Gregory (1869-1859) was articled to his father and became a partner with his father in 1897. Harry Garnham Watkins (1870/71-1956), joined the practice of Albert Nelson Bromley, formed the partnership of Bromley and Watkins from 1912 to 1928, and was to become a leading architect in Nottinghamshire. Frank Peck (1863-1931) was articled to Watkins and Scorer between 1879 and 1883 before working in the office of Sir Aston Webb, He was the architect for the Petwood Hotel in Woodhall Spa and Christ Church Cathedral, Nelson in New Zealand. A Lincoln architect Fred Baker was articled to Watkins from 1891-1895. William Watkins retired from the practice in 1918, and it was continued by his son William Gregory Watkins until 1934, when Bob Coombes (1900-1968) became a partner. The practice had moved to Heslam Chambers, 191 High Street, Lincoln by 1959. The practice later moved to 4 Burton Road Lincoln (now the Bronze Pig restaurant), and it ceased operating about 1990.

Watkins became a member of the City Council in 1877, served as Mayor of Lincoln in 1888-89, and became a Justice of the Peace in 1901.

=== Watkins' Architectural Practice ===
- William Watkins 1864-1881
- Watkins and Scorer 1877-1883
- Watkins and Son (W.G Watkins)
- Watkins and Coombes (1934–1948)
- Watkins, Coombes & Barrell 1948-1951
- Watkins, Coombes & Partners 1951-

== Works include ==
=== Public buildings ===
It is suggested by Antram that the Lincoln Drill Hall was by Watkins The attribution is incorrect – the architect was Henry Goddard.

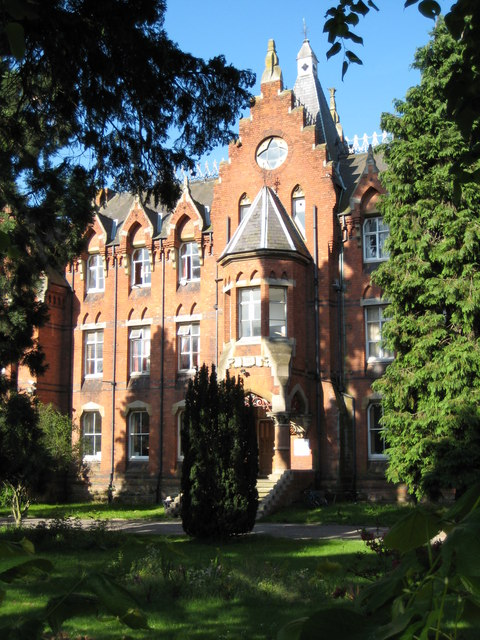
Royal Albert Orphanage, Worcester

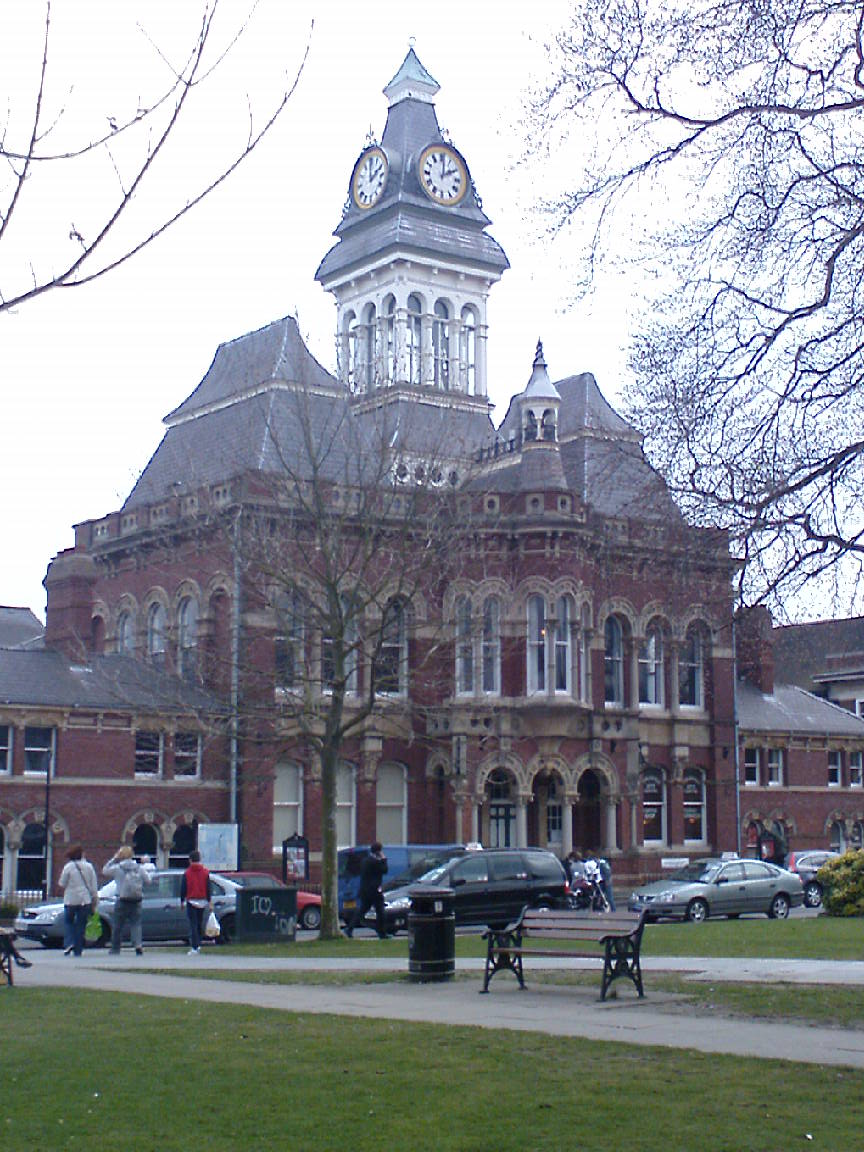
Grantham Guildhall 1867–1869

- Royal Albert Orphanage, Henwick, Worcester. 1868. The building cost £5,000 and the contract was won by Watkins in open competition. Funds were raised for the construction of permanent premises for the institution, with a donation of £4,000 being received from local MP Alderman Richard Padmore, and legacy of £1,000 in 1866 from Mr Edward Wheeler. A site was obtained on Henwick Road, Worcester, and a competition held for designs for the new building. The plans put forward by William Watkins and Samuel Dutton Walker were chosen.
- Infirmary, Kidderminster.(1869) Plans submitted by Watkins were the winning entry for the Infirmary.
- Grantham Guildhall, Grantham. 1867–1869. This is an early work by Watkins in an Italianate/ Jacobethan Revival style with stone dressing and florid Corinthian columns surmounted by a clock tower giving a heavy and ungainly appearance. The Guildhall, as originally designed, was made up of three separate buildings – the main building, which housed a ballroom and courtroom (or session's hall); a governor's residence and a gaol for up to 18 men and women on two floors. The work was carried out Mr Wartnaby, of Little Gonerby, for £7,260. In 1991 it was redesigned by the Sleaford architect Tim Benton and re-opened as the council owned Guildhall Arts Centre at a cost of £1.2 million.

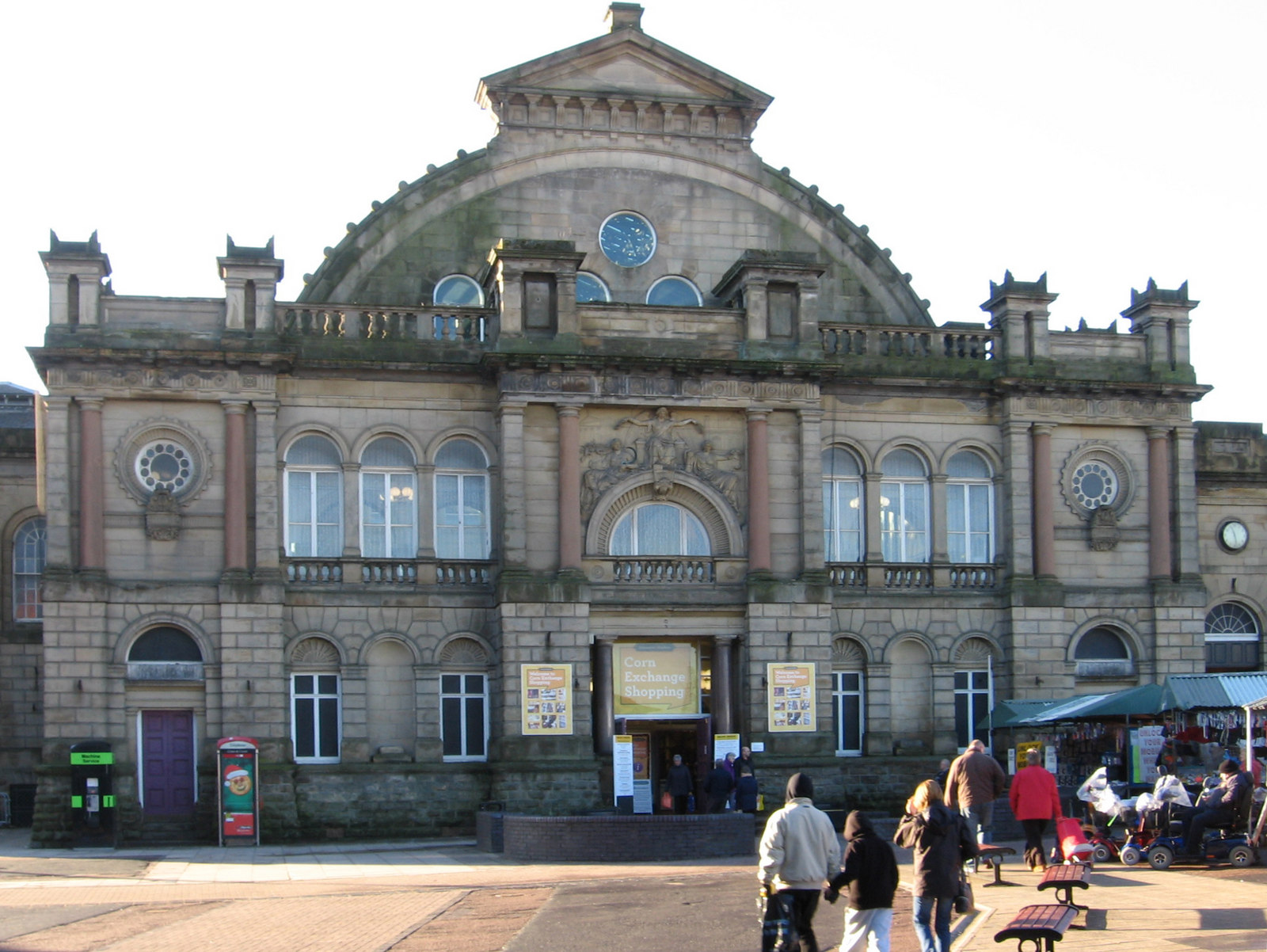
Doncaster - Corn Exchange 1870-1873

- Doncaster Corn Exchange. The impressive facade and arched Exchange buildings were built to the designs of Watkins of Lincoln, who won an architectural competition in 1870. It is set within an earlier U-shaped Market Hall structure of 1847-1849 by J Butterfield, the architect to Doncaster Corporation. The Corn Market, Market Hall and Fish Markets were further extended in 1930 and the overall complex is Grade II listed. The Corn Exchange has advanced central and side bays with projecting stonework to corners, acting as plinths for clasping) corner pilasters and adjacent engaged red sandstone columns to first floor. The balustrade to front has a plinth inscribed Wm Cotterill Clark Mayor 1873. The interior of the corn exchange is very elaborate with a gallery supported on a round arched arcade with alternating plain and panelled pilasters between the arches. Galleries to sides have paired iron columns with foliate capitals supported by round arches of pierced ironwork with sumptuous decoration to the spandrels. Roof with iron arched trusses with decorative bracing, with a large central ridge light supported on foliate trusses.
- General Dispensary, Silver Street, Lincoln. 1879. By Watkins and Scorer. (This was on the south side of Silver Street and was demolished about 1963.)

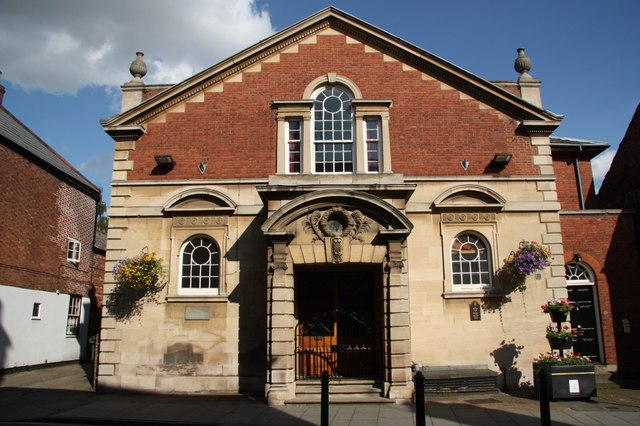
County Assembly Rooms. Bailgate, Lincoln. Facade by Watkins 1914.

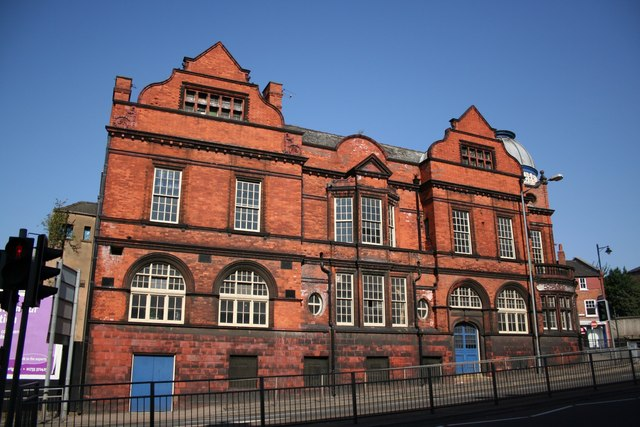
Lincoln Constitutional Club-Silver Street/Broadgate

- Outpatients at Lincoln County Hospital, Sewell Road, Lincoln. 1891.
- Masonic Hall and Concert Room, Newland, Lincoln (1871). Originally built for the Masonic Hall Company. This was not a successful venture and the project became insolvent around 1888. Gothic revival style. Later Palace Theatre and then Plaza Cinema. It was demolished as a result of a fire in the 2nd World War.
- Constitutional Club, on corner of Broadgate with Silver Street, Lincoln 1895. With a domed circular vestibule at the corner and enriched with terracotta work presumably from Ruabon.
- County Assembly Rooms, Bailgate, Lincoln. 1914. Watkins added a new facade to this building with a Venetian window set in the gable above the entrance. The building contains a fine interior dating from 1745
- Lincoln Municipal Technical School (1908) Monks Roads. Brick with stone dressing. Now demolished.

=== Banks ===
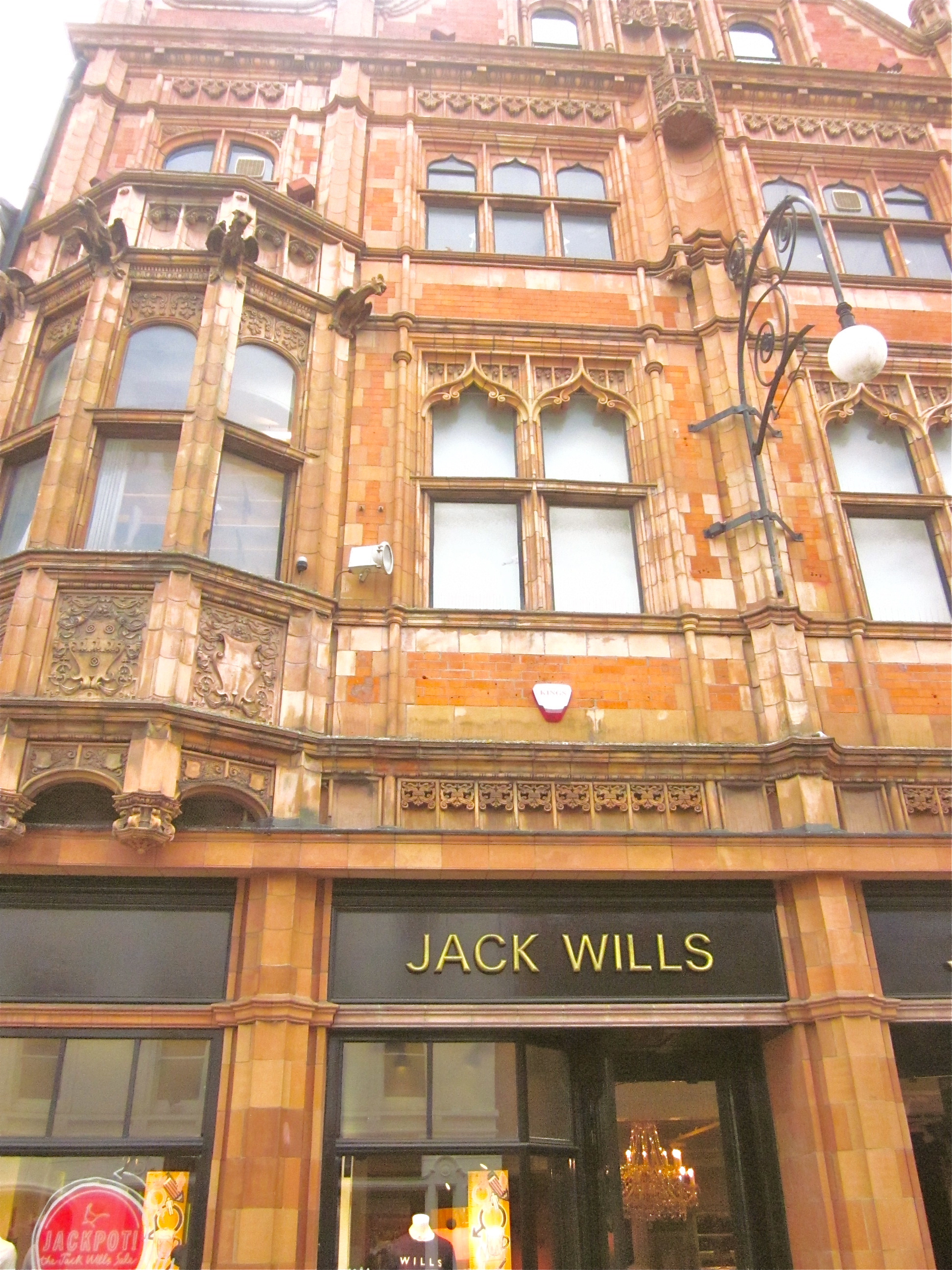
Doulton Terracotta detailing on the former Peacock & Willsons Bank, High Street, Lincoln

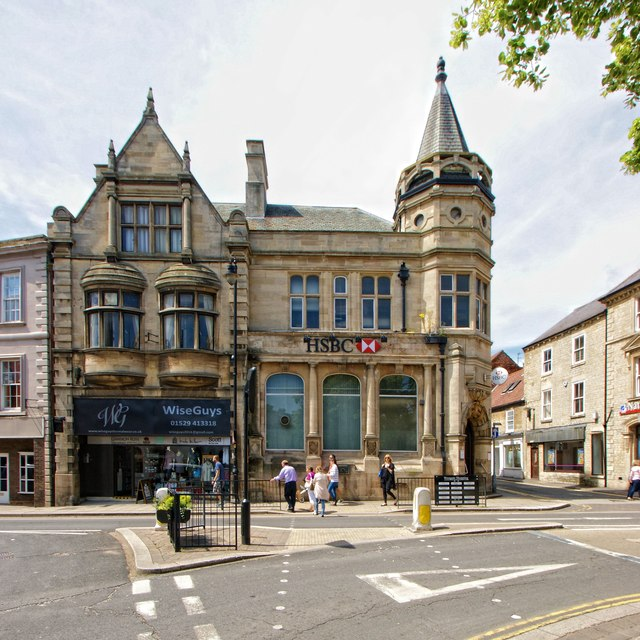
HSBC Bank, Market Place, Sleaford, 1903

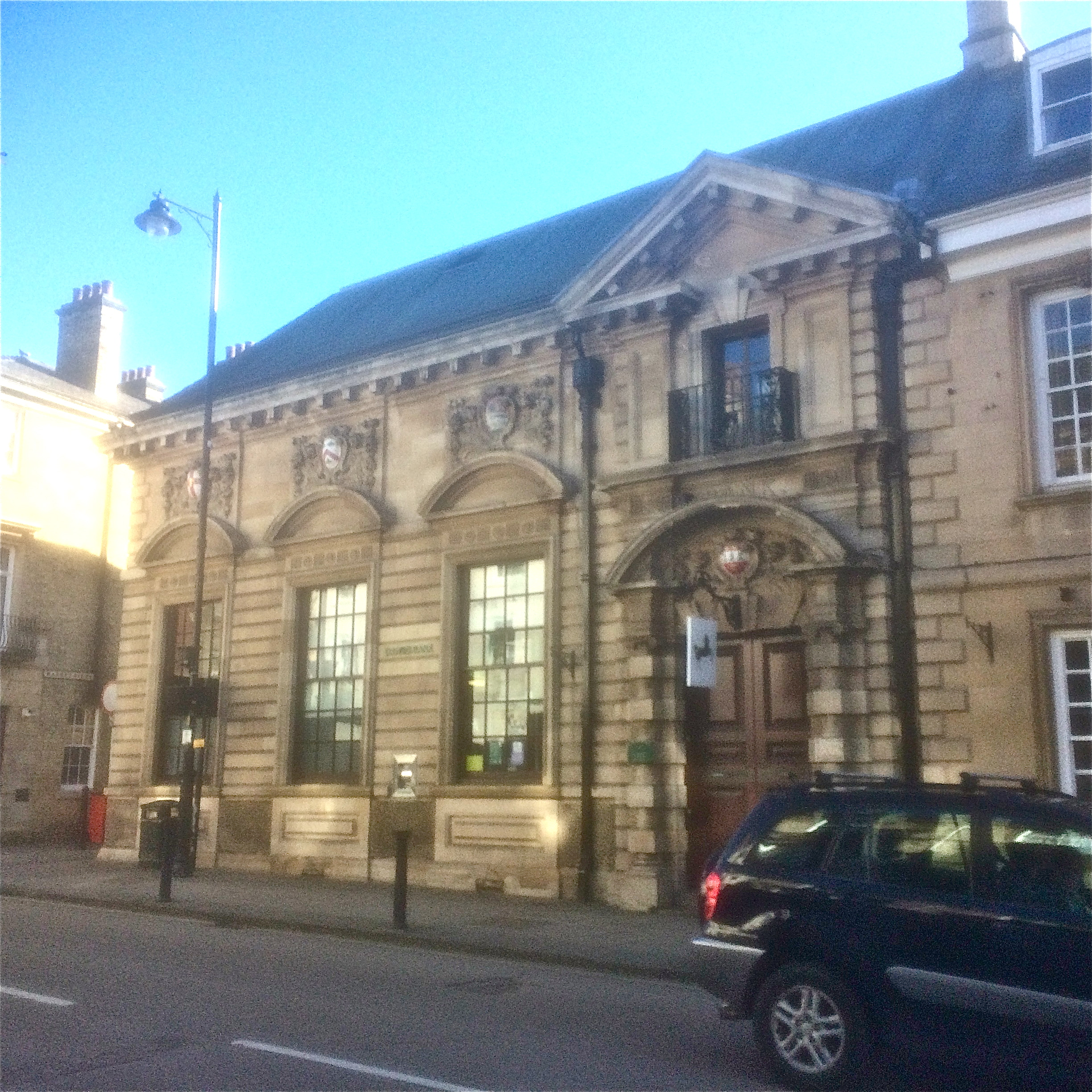
Lloyds Bank Sleaford, Lincolnshire

- Peacock and Willson's Bank, 1900-1, High Street Lincoln. 1897. (Now Jack Wills). This building is an important example of Flemish Gothic Revival style and is probably Watkins finest work. Watkins provided the drawings used to fashion the elaborate terracotta mouldings which were provided by Doulton and Company, probably from their production plant at Rowley Regis in the West Midlands. It was restored to its original appearances at street level in 1992.
- HSBC, High Street Lincoln, 1893. Formerly the Lincoln and Lindsey Bank, later Midland Bank, The earlier building was occupied by Hepworths the clothiers. Watkins left the upper part of the building untouched, but the exterior walls and the ground and first floors were removed and the stone facade and strongrooms were inserted. The new banking hall has an impressive ceiling with Elizabethan style strap-work decoration and the coats of arms of the Lincolnshire Boroughs. The building was extended between 1923 and 1926.
- Sleaford. The Midland Bank (now HSBC) was built in 1903, designed by William Watkins and Son, in a stone faced Jacobethan/Renaissance Revival style with shaped gables and oriel windows. The ground floor entrance at the corner of Westgate with Southgate Street has a heavily moulded entrance with a corner tower above and the ground floor windows are set between columns.
- Lloyd's Bank, Northgate, Sleaford 1905. Baroque revival. Formerly Peacock Willson & Co Bank which was established in 1792 in a house built in 1702 for Robert Alvey. Watkins and Son extended this building in a matching architectural style to the north of the original building which is adjacent to the Sleaford Sessions house. The new building was technically advanced, heated with low pressure hot water with electric lighting throughout. The 9 foot diameter glass dome in the centre of the banking chamber was fitted with a patent air extractor.

==== The HSBC Bank, Lincoln, Gallery: work by Watkins ====
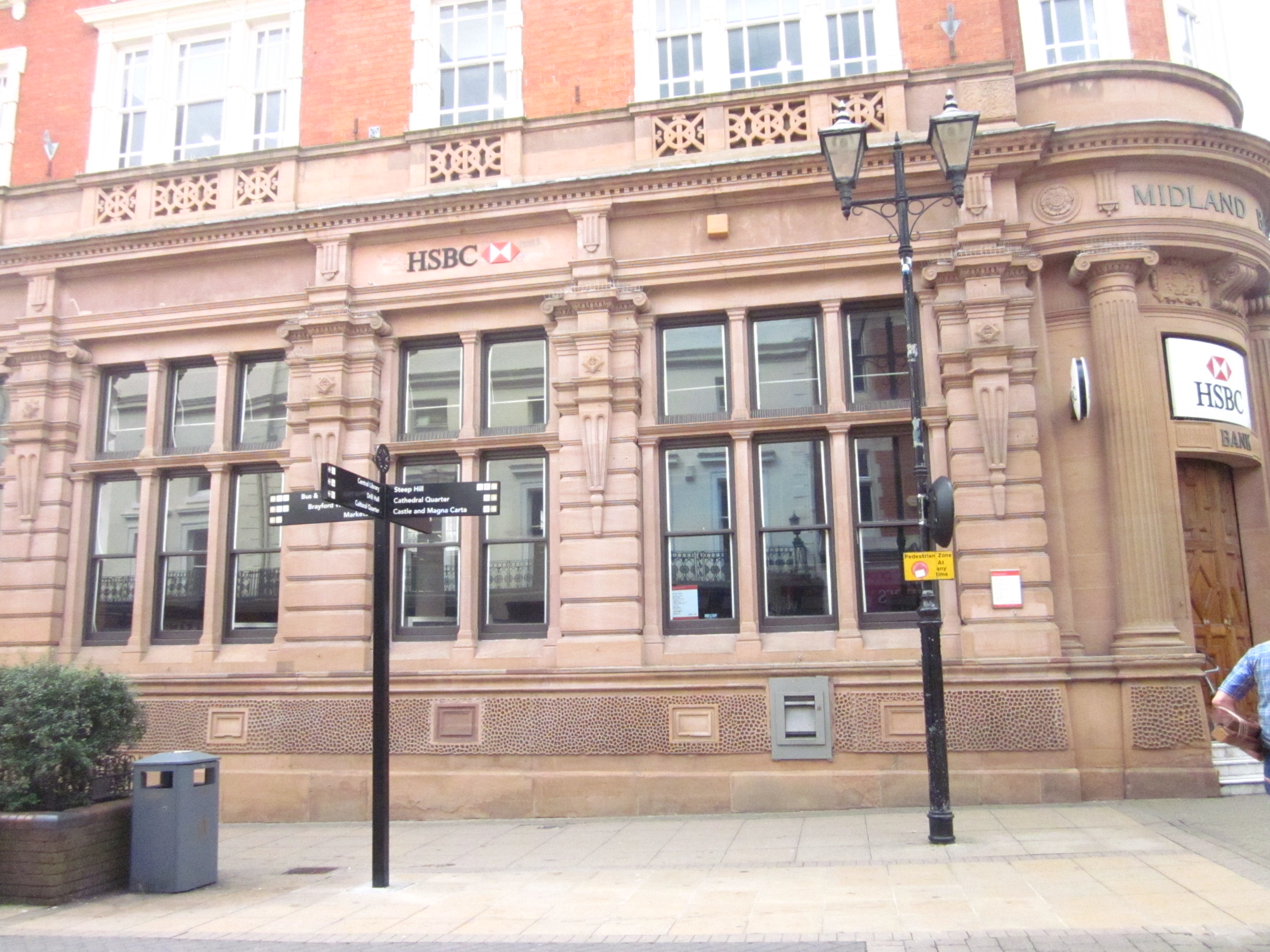
HSBC Lincoln

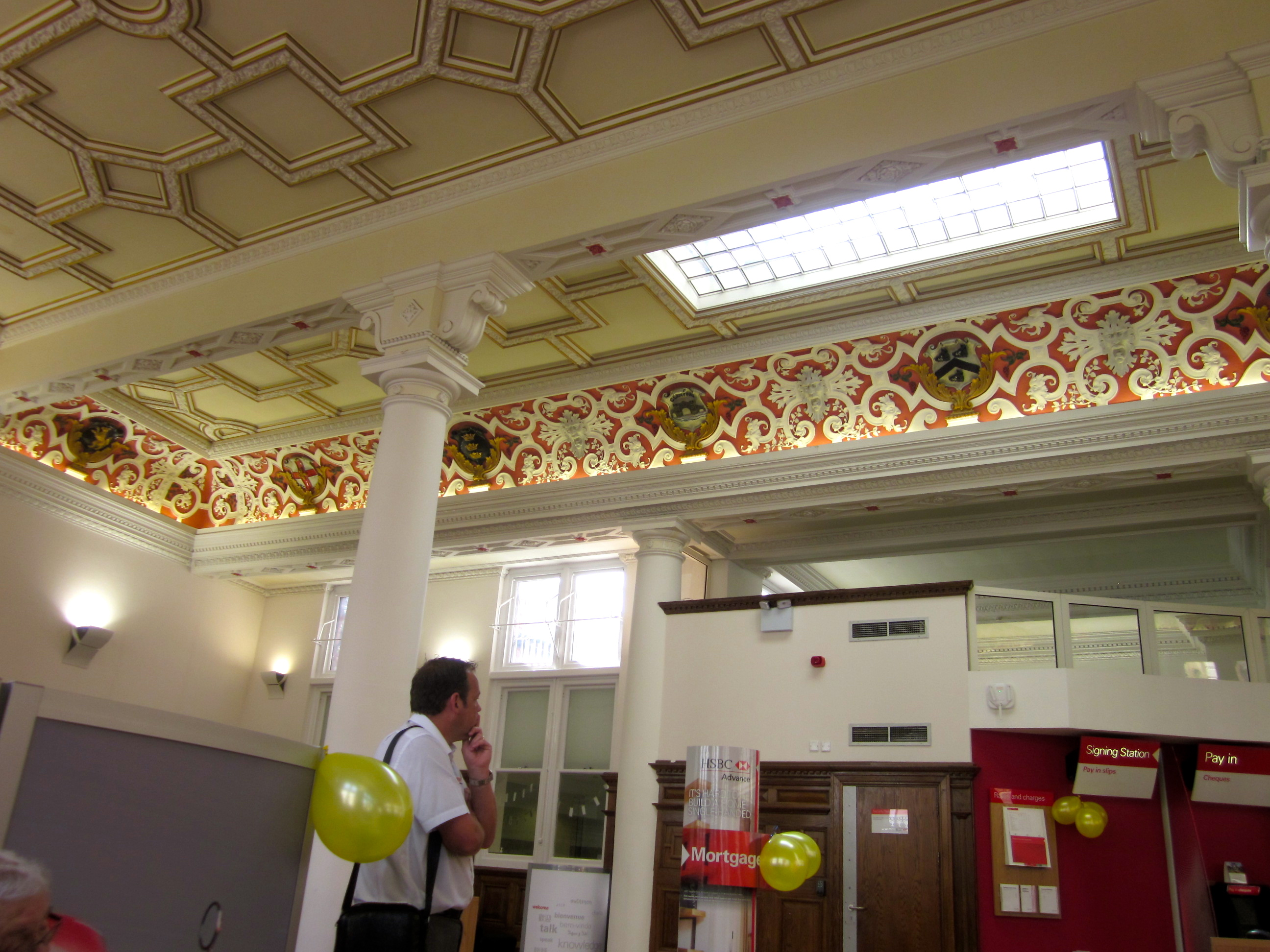
HSBC Bank Lincoln

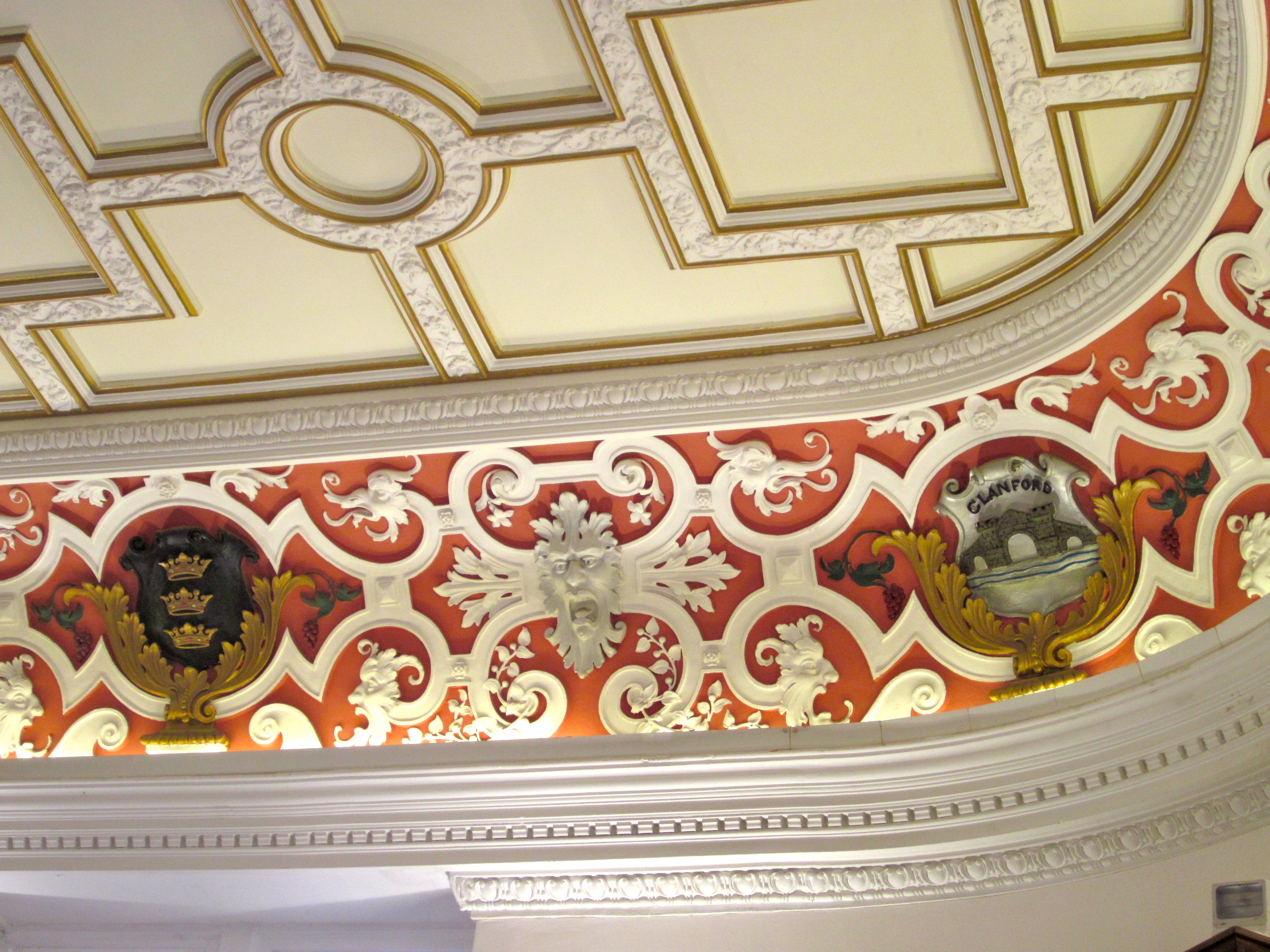
HSBC Bank Lincoln

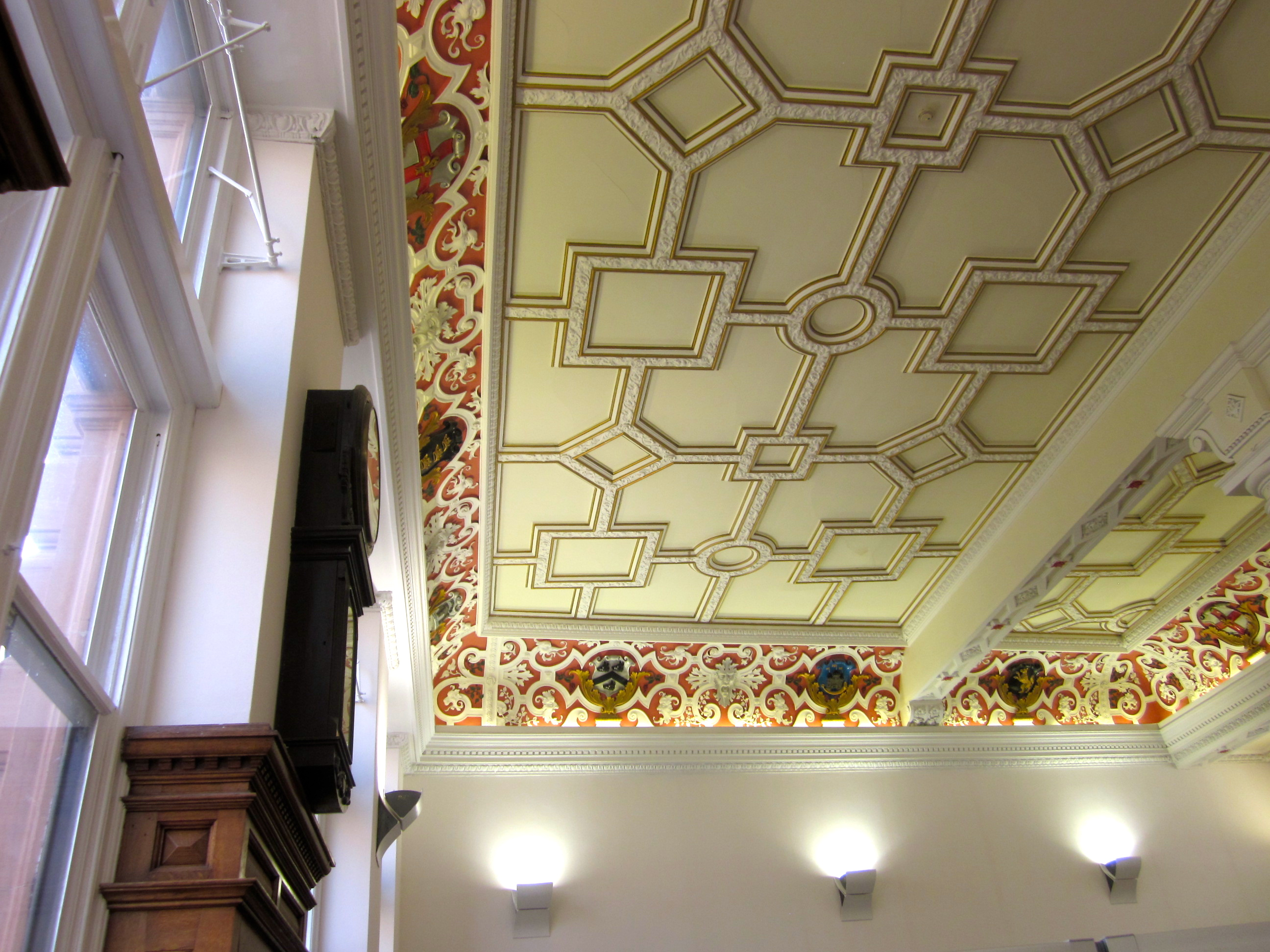
HSBC Bank Lincoln

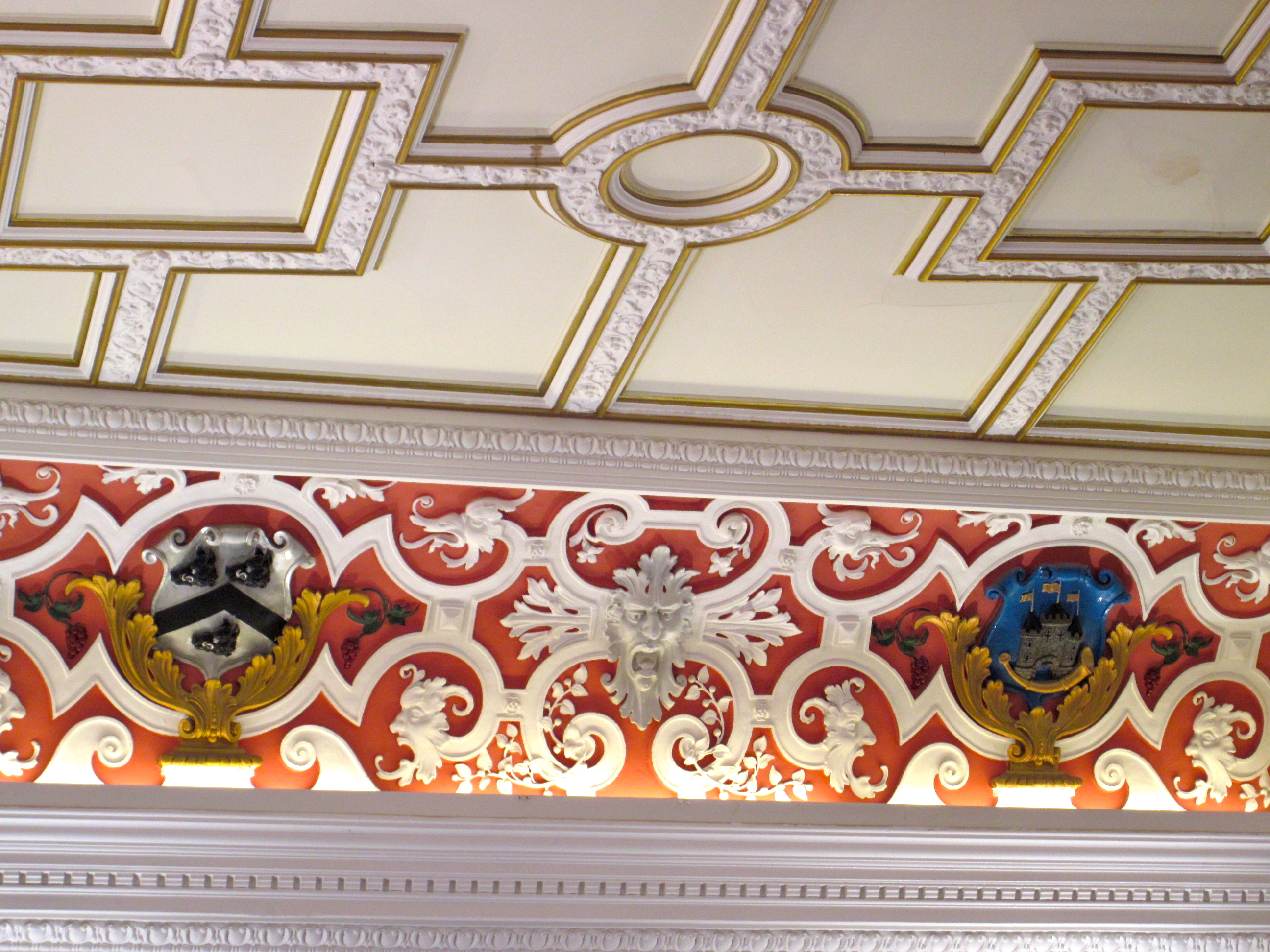
HSBC Bank Lincoln

=== Shops ===
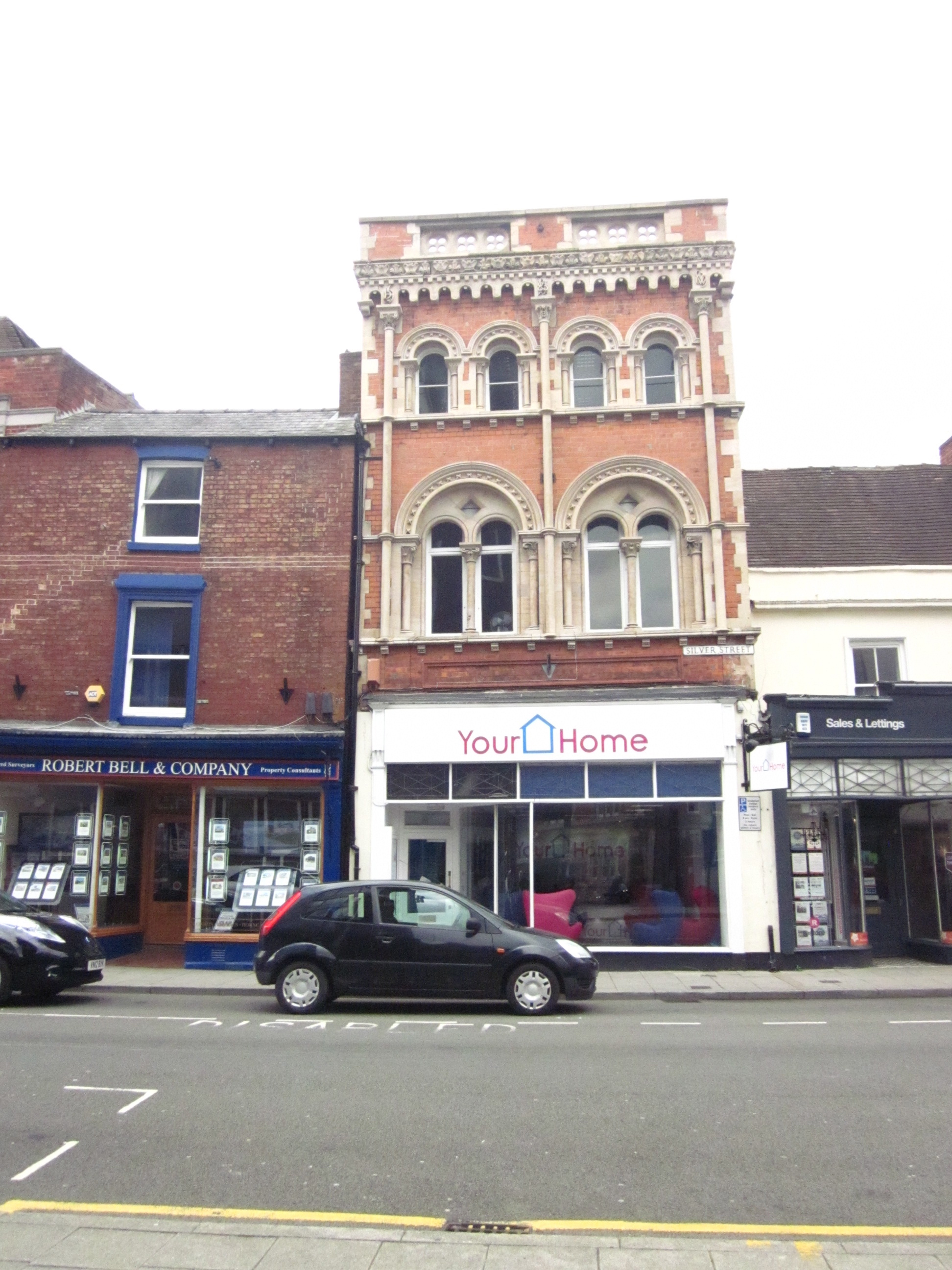
42 Silver Street, Lincoln

- 42 Silver Street, Lincoln. 1873. Originally built as a warehouse by William Watkins for Mr J Harrison and in 1896 was Lincoln Working Man's Conservative Club. An example of Romanesque Revival Architecture in the Florentine style, but it shares many similarities with Bristol Byzantine architecture. Brick with stone dressings. Three storeys. Quoins, bracketed string courses, wavy corbel table, billeted frieze, pierced, balustrade, ringed wall shafts.

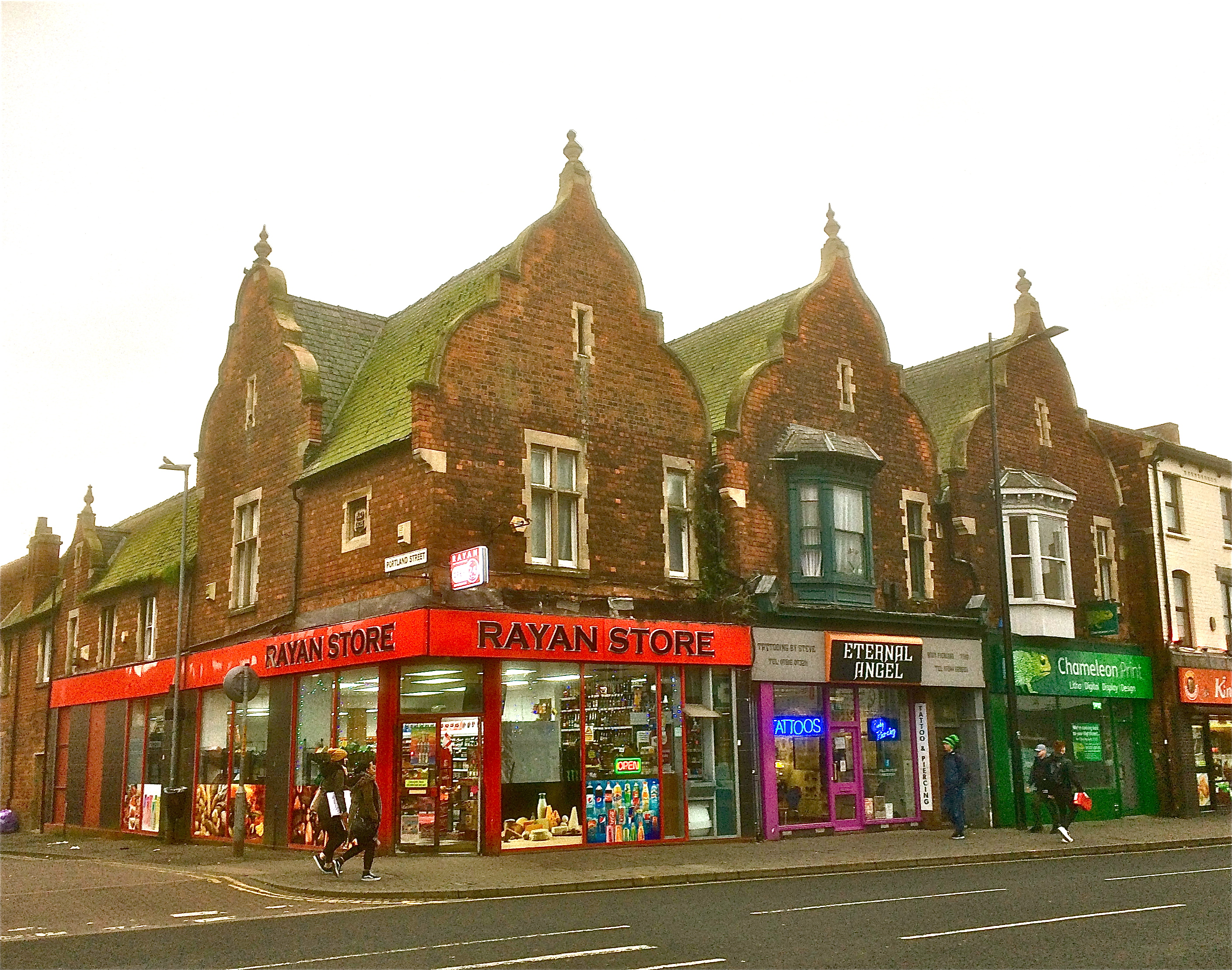
365-7 High Street, Lincoln

- 365-7 High Street, Lincoln. On the corner of Portland Street with the High Street and dated 1874. Originally built for Messrs. Usher and Axtell. Three brick buildings with stone dressings, with shaped or Dutch Gables facing the High Street, and a larger and smaller gable facing onto Portland Street. The High Street gables have been offset to emphasise the individuality of the buildings. At the time the style would be described as ‘‘Elizabethan’’, but to-day as Jacobethan.

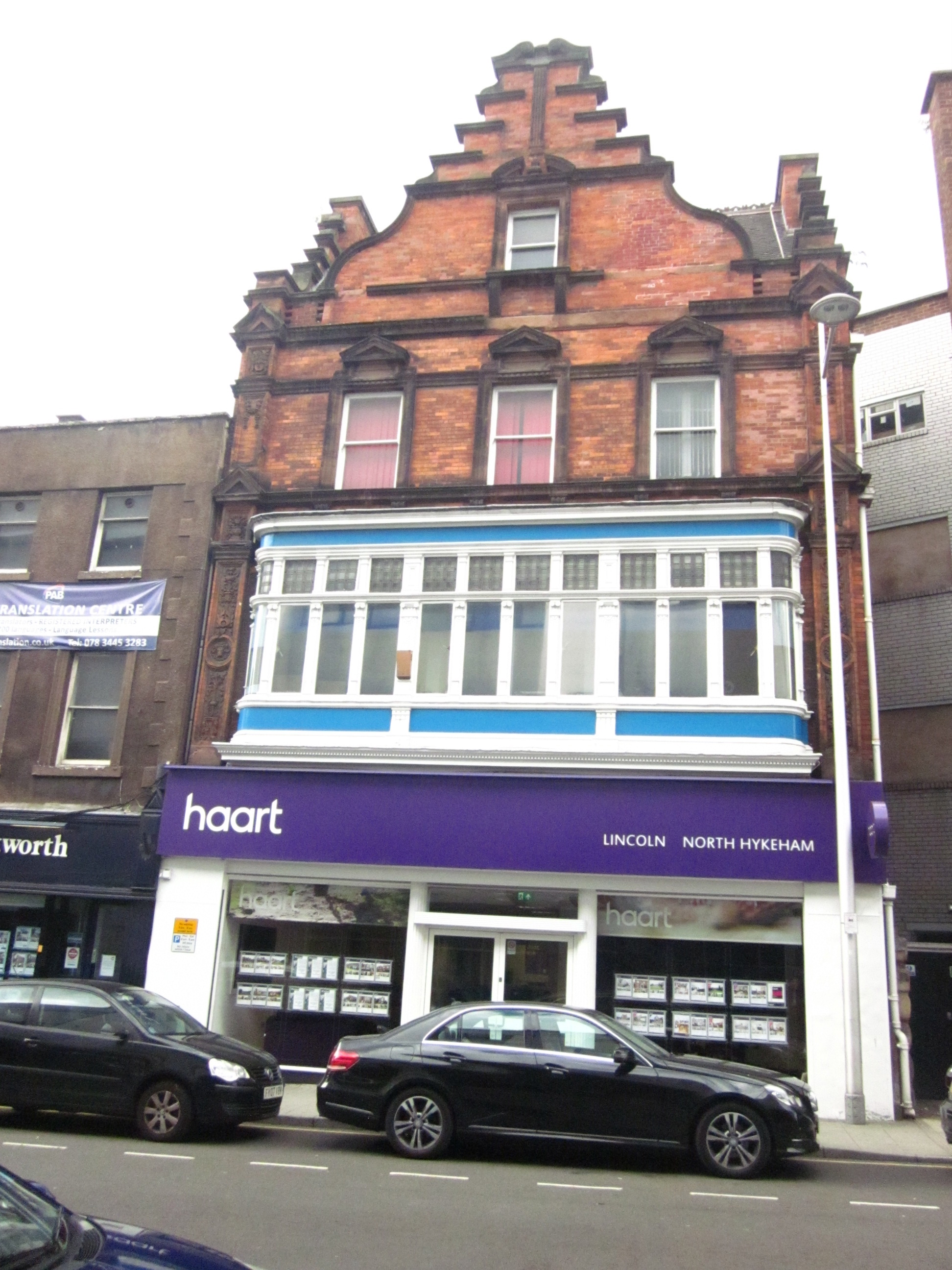
37 Silver Street, Lincoln Terracotta shop facade 1889

- 37 Silver Street, Lincoln. Brick with terracotta embellished corner pilasters. Prominent Dutch gable on the street frontage with gables also on the sides. Full width glazed balcony display window. Frontage altered for R. C. Carline

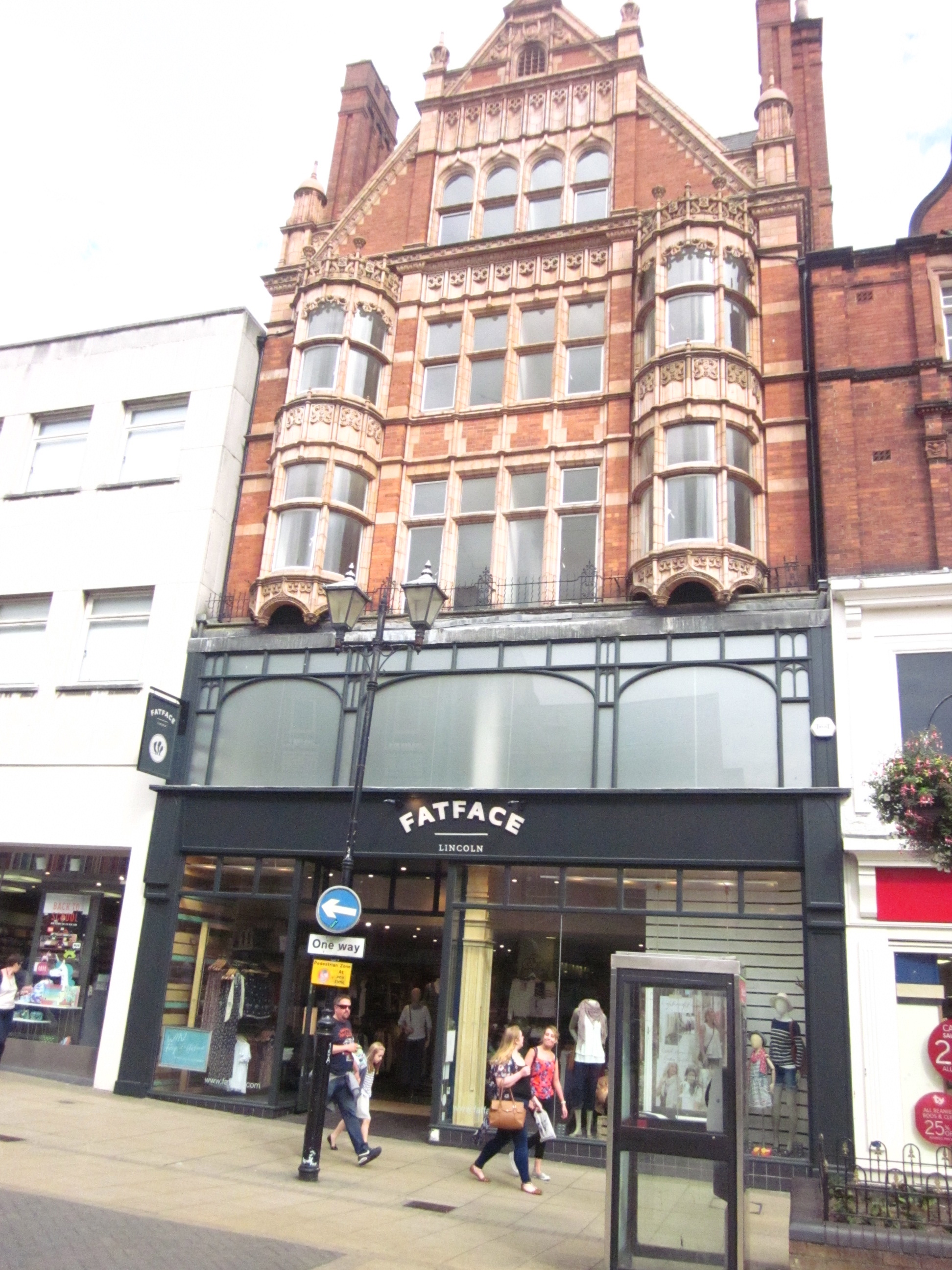
Hathern Terracotta by Watkins for Hewitt Brown and Co, 305/6 High Street, Lincoln, 1900

- 305/6 High Street, Lincoln. 1900, designed for Hewitt Brown & Co. (Now Fat Face). Brick with terracotta dressings-terracotta dressings were made by the Hathern Station Brick Co. of Loughborough. Flemish Renaissance Revival style. Giant pilasters, those at the angles with domed finials, enriched moulded cornice and coped gable. 4 storeys plus attics, 3 bays. Windows have terracotta mullions and transoms. Fascia with a full-width glazed panel above it. Above, window flanked by single bow windows, and above that a gable has a 4-light ogee-headed window with a blind arcade and a latticed round-headed opening in the gable peak, flanked by pilasters with domed finials.
- 216 High Street Lincoln. 1902. Shop for C. J. Fox and Co. This has been demolished and is now the site of Primark.

=== Restoration work ===
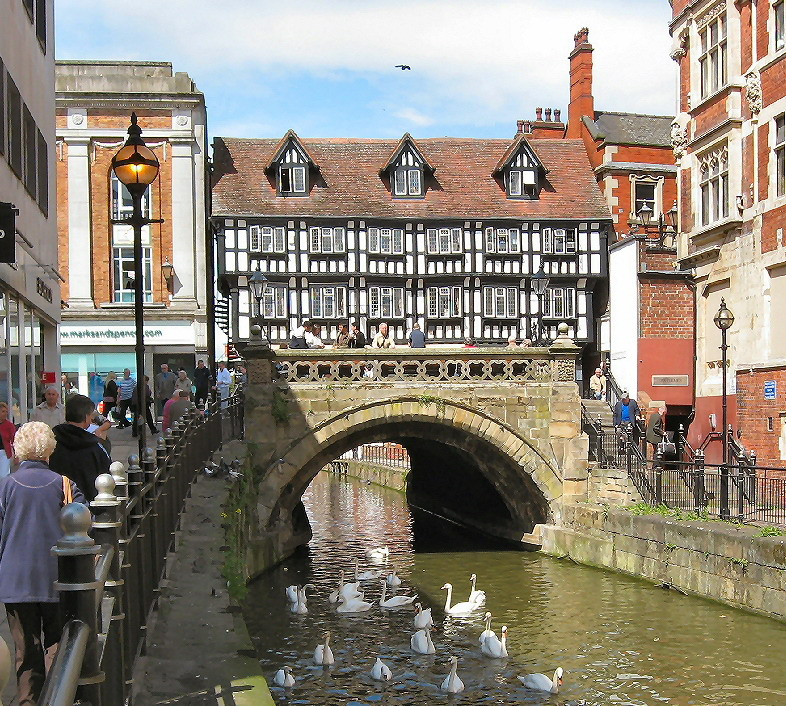
High Bridge, High Street, Lincoln

- Greyfriars, Free School Lane (formerly the City and County Museum). Watkins converted the undercroft of the Franciscan Friary into a museum in 1909.
- The High Bridge, Lincoln. The 16th-century jettied timber framed shops on the bridge were partly dismantled and re-erected by Watkins in 1900–01.

=== Churches ===
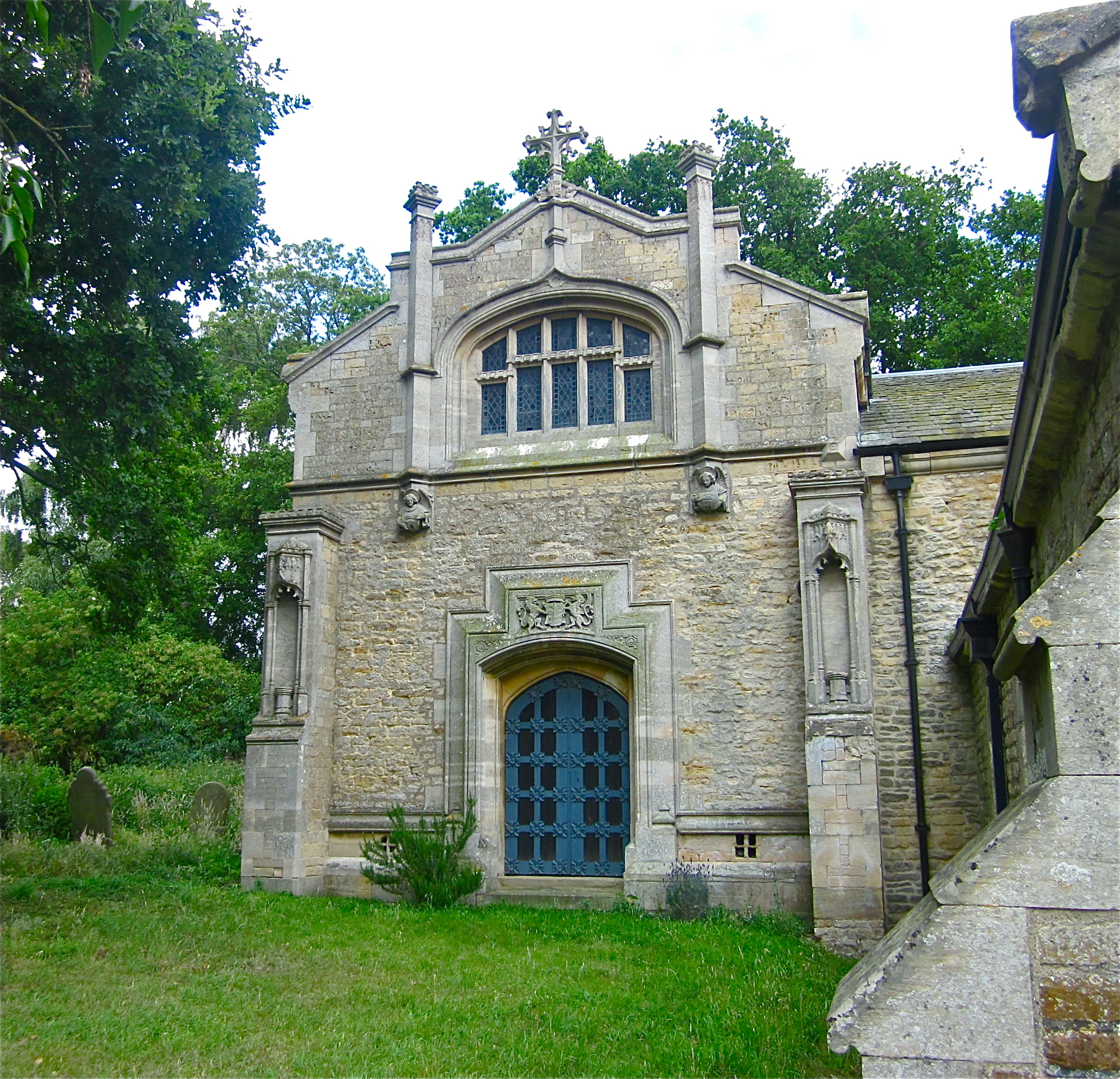
The Monson Mausoleum at South Carlton Church, 1897–98

- St. Mark, High Street Lincoln 1871–72. Large church in 13th. century style without aisles and with lancet windows and tracery. Slender north tower with spire.
- St Botolph, High Street, Lincoln. Nave and north aisle 1861, by Henry Goddard. The chancel was rebuilt in 1878, and the south aisle and south chapel added 1884 by William Watkins. Dressed stone and ashlar with slate roof.
- All Saints Sixhills, Lincolnshire. Partial rebuilding and restoration of church for Edward Heneage. Pevsner states that this work was by James Fowler of Louth, but this appears to be incorrect.
- St Mary-le-Wigford, Lincoln. Restoration of the tower in 1908
- South Carlton, Lincolnshire, The Monson Mausoleum was added to the north transept or chapel of South Carlton Church by Watkins in 1897–98.
- St Mary-le-Wigford, Lincoln. Restoration of the tower in 1908

=== Methodist Chapel ===
- Wesleyan Free Methodist Chapel, Bigby Street, Brigg. (1865). Described in 1964 by Pevsner as a brick horror. In fact a very competent example of Methodist chapel building, already using decorative brickwork in the Ruskinian Gothic style. Now demolished. The Lincolnshire Chronicle records in May 1864 four designs were sent in, Mr. Watkins, who has lately commenced practice in this city, had the first premium awarded him, and is engaged to carry out the works. The other competing architects were Messrs. Bellamy and Hardy, of Lincoln and Mr. Kitchen, of Hull. The chapel is intended to accommodate 350 persons, and will have schools beneath for 250 children.

=== Schools ===
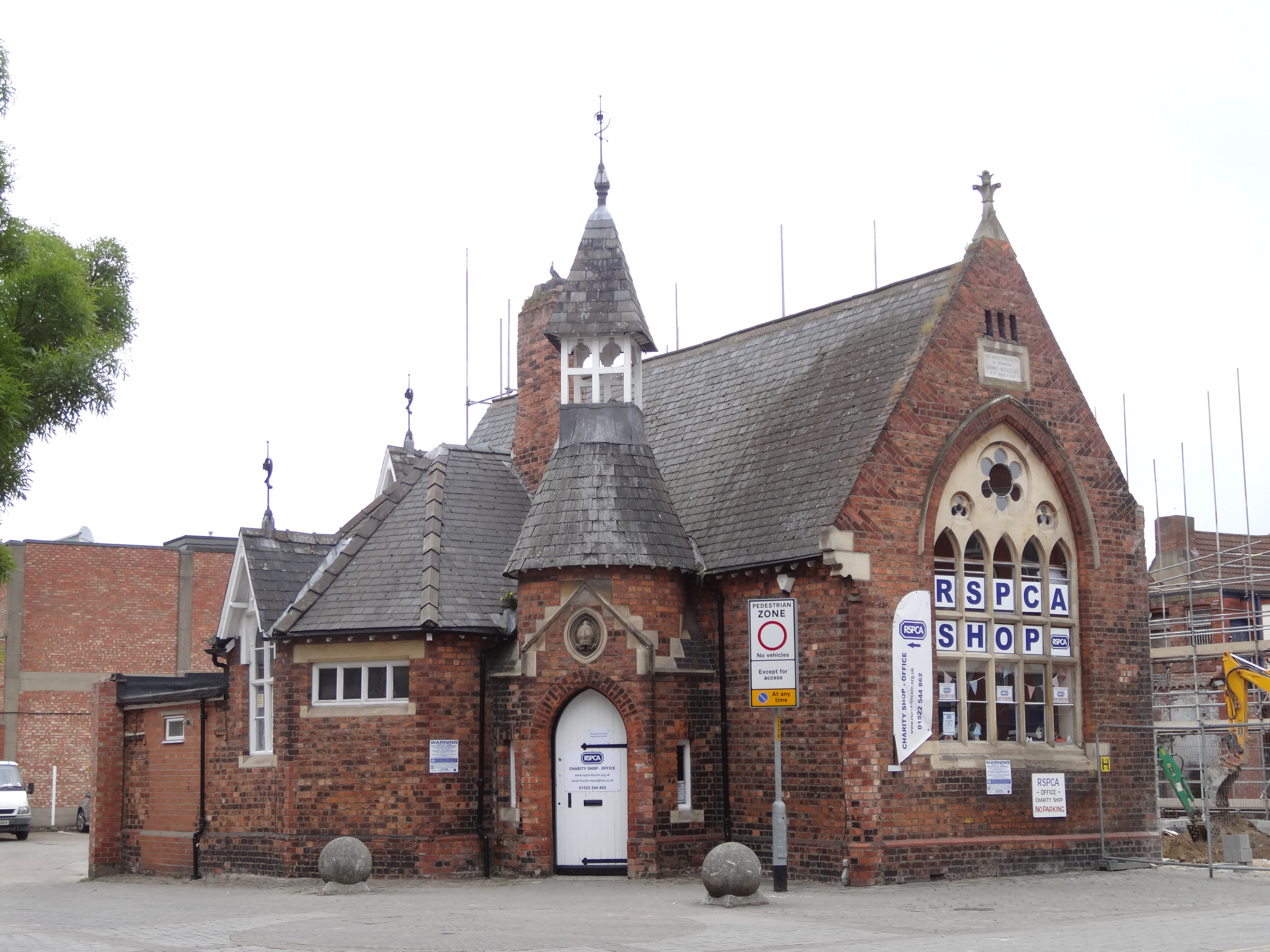
St Mark's Parochial School,1875

- Osgodby Village School, Market Rasen. 1868. In Tudor Gothic style. Schoolroom with lateral chimney stack. Cream coloured brick with red brick tumbling on gables
- St. Mark's Parochial School. Lincoln The school was built in 1875, and was closed in December 1907 as the premises were deemed to be unsuitable for a public elementary school. Later St Mark's Church Hall and now RSPCA charity shop. L-shaped brick building with circular turreted entrance set in the angle. Above the door a bishop's mitre, conical roof surmounted by a cupola. Large gothic window on the south elevation of the main school hall.

Bracebridge, Lincolnshire. Board School,(1880) between Francis Street and Ewart Street. Watkin's original building's now appear to have been largely replaced.

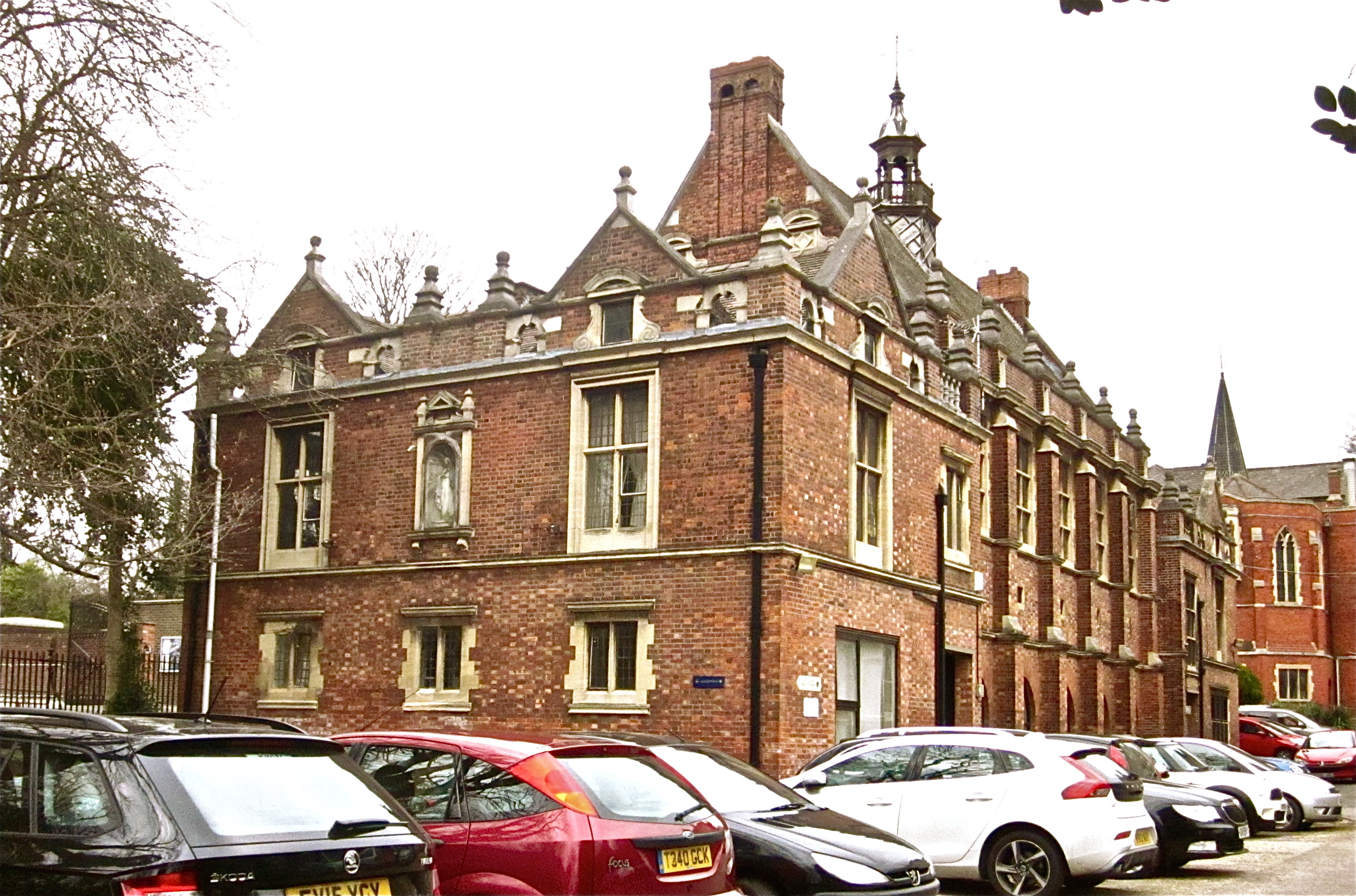
Old Lincoln Grammar School Buildings by William Watkins, 1884

- Grammar School, Lindum Terrace, Lincoln (now Lincoln Minster School) 1884. The school was designed by Watkins in 1883–84 and was moved from this site to Wragby Road in 1906. It became the St Joseph Convent School and is now part of the Lincoln Minster School. Lincoln Minster School was formed in 1996 through a merger of the Cathedral School for Boys, St Joseph's School for Girls and Stonefield House School.
- Christ's Hospital School for Girls, Lincoln. 1893 and extended in 1911. This is a particularly fine example of Romanesque Revival architecture in the United Kingdom After 1974 the building became part of Lincoln School of Art. It is built in red brick with Ruabon terracotta ornamentation.
- St Peter in Eastgate Primary School, Eastgate, Lincoln. A further school was built on this site by Watkins in 1881 which was later combined with the earlier school of 1851 by William Adams Nicholson

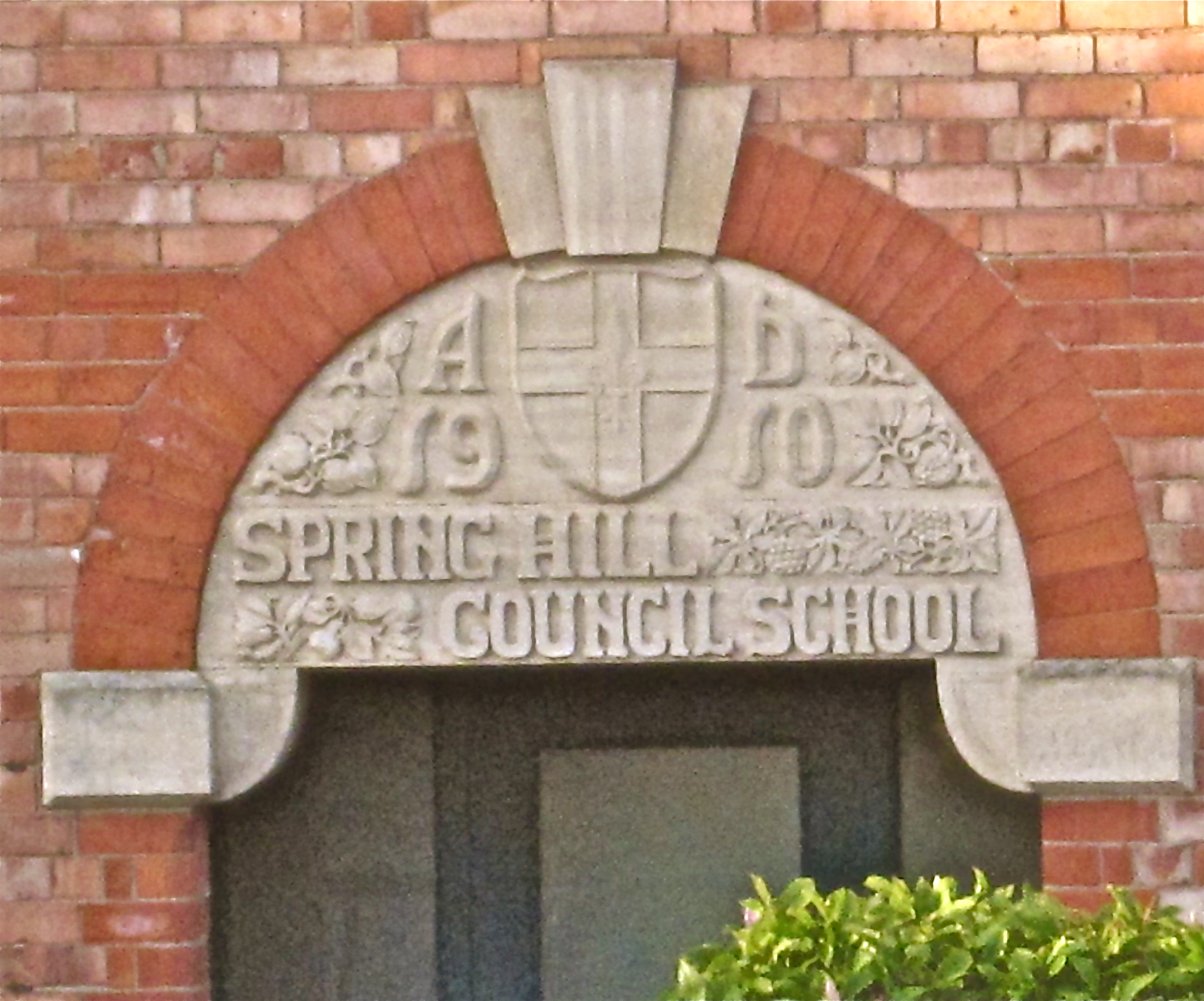
Spring Hill Council School, Lincoln

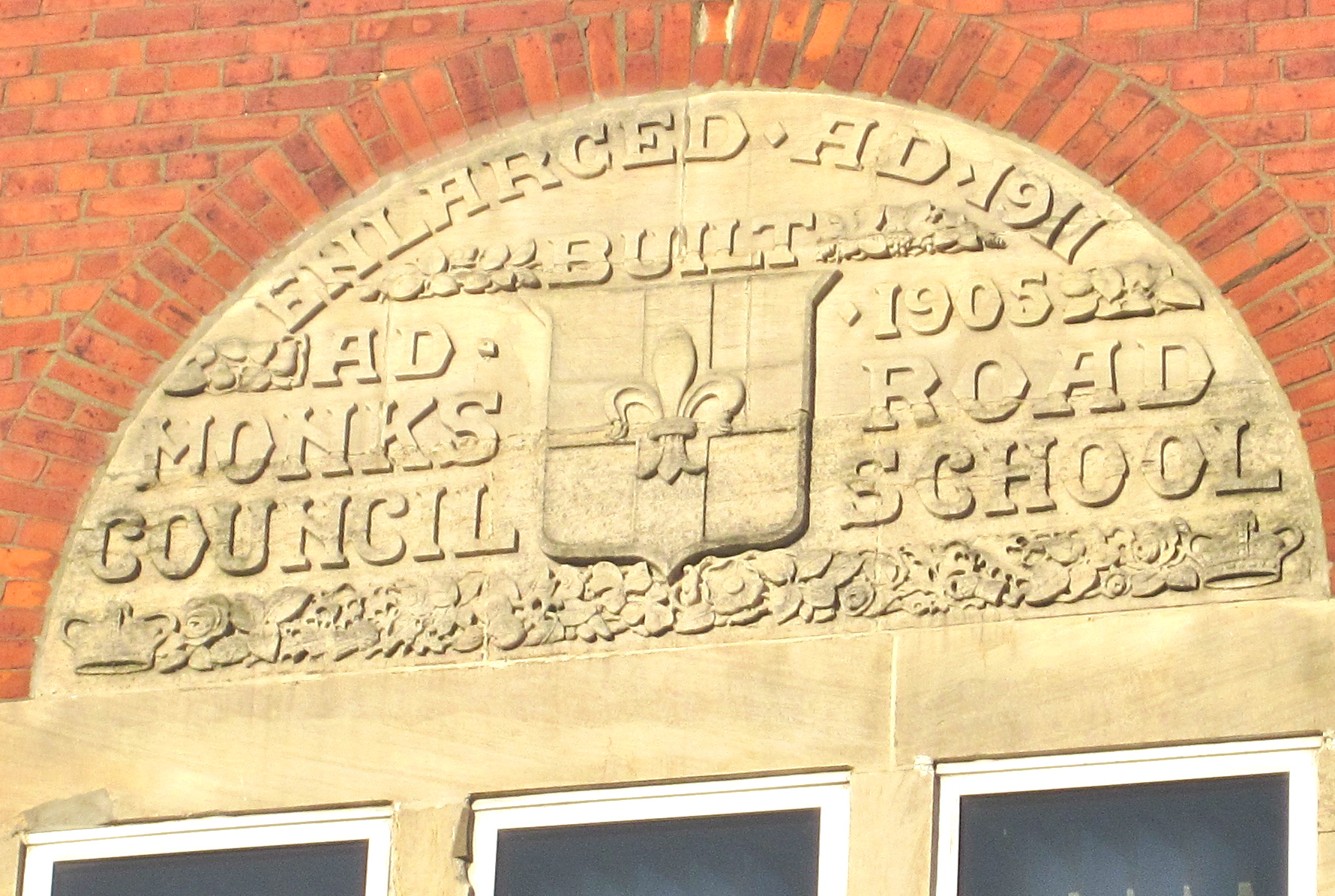
Datestone Monk's Road Primary School, Lincoln. 1905/1911

- Spring Hill National School, Hungate, Lincoln. 1910. School buildings now converted into the Ropery housing development.
- Monk's Road Primary School, Lincoln. 1903/4 and later extended. A similar datestone to the Spring Hill School is above the gable window on this school.
- Sincil Bank School, Lincoln. 1912.

=== Houses ===
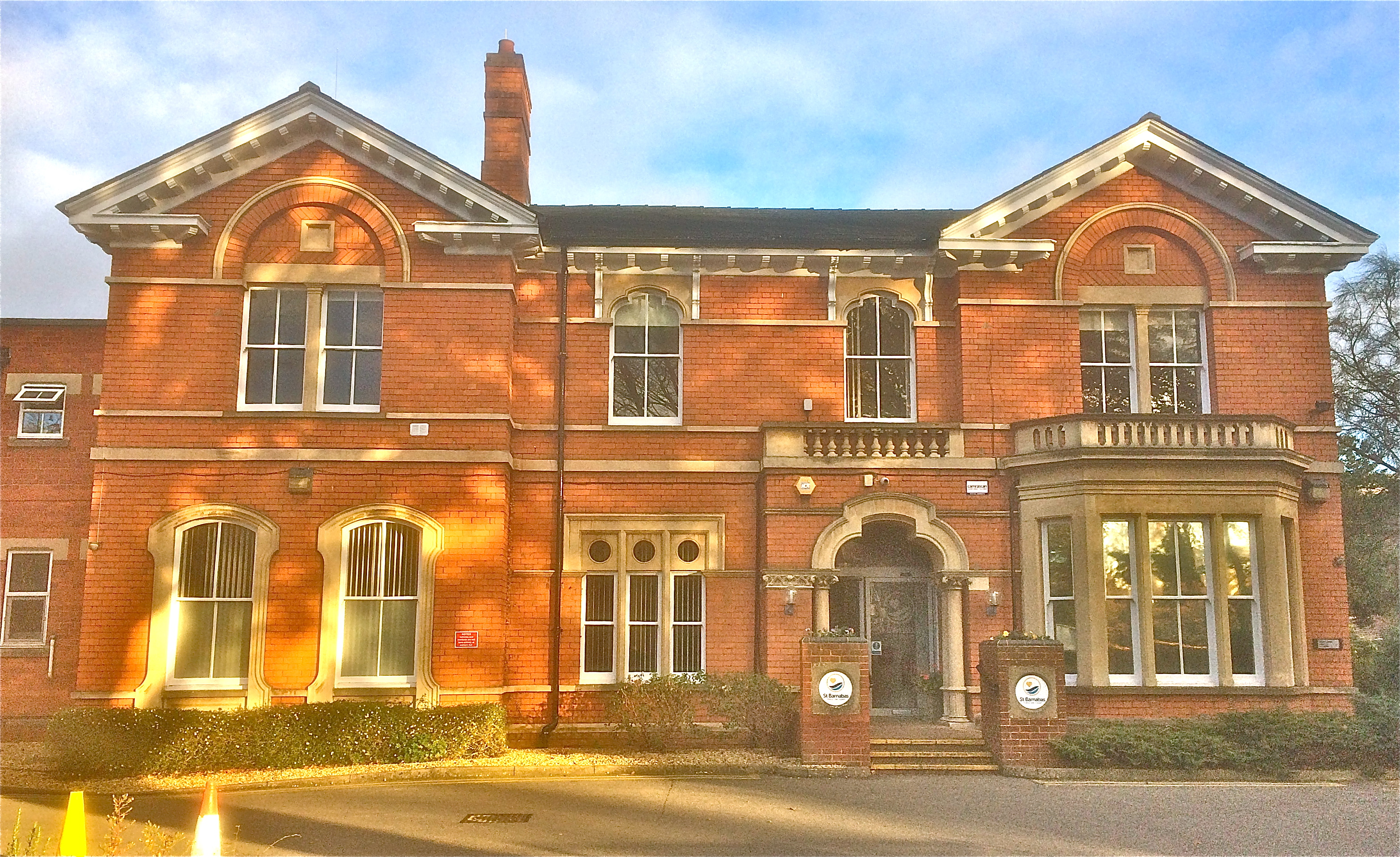
Essendon, 36 Nettleham Road, Lincoln

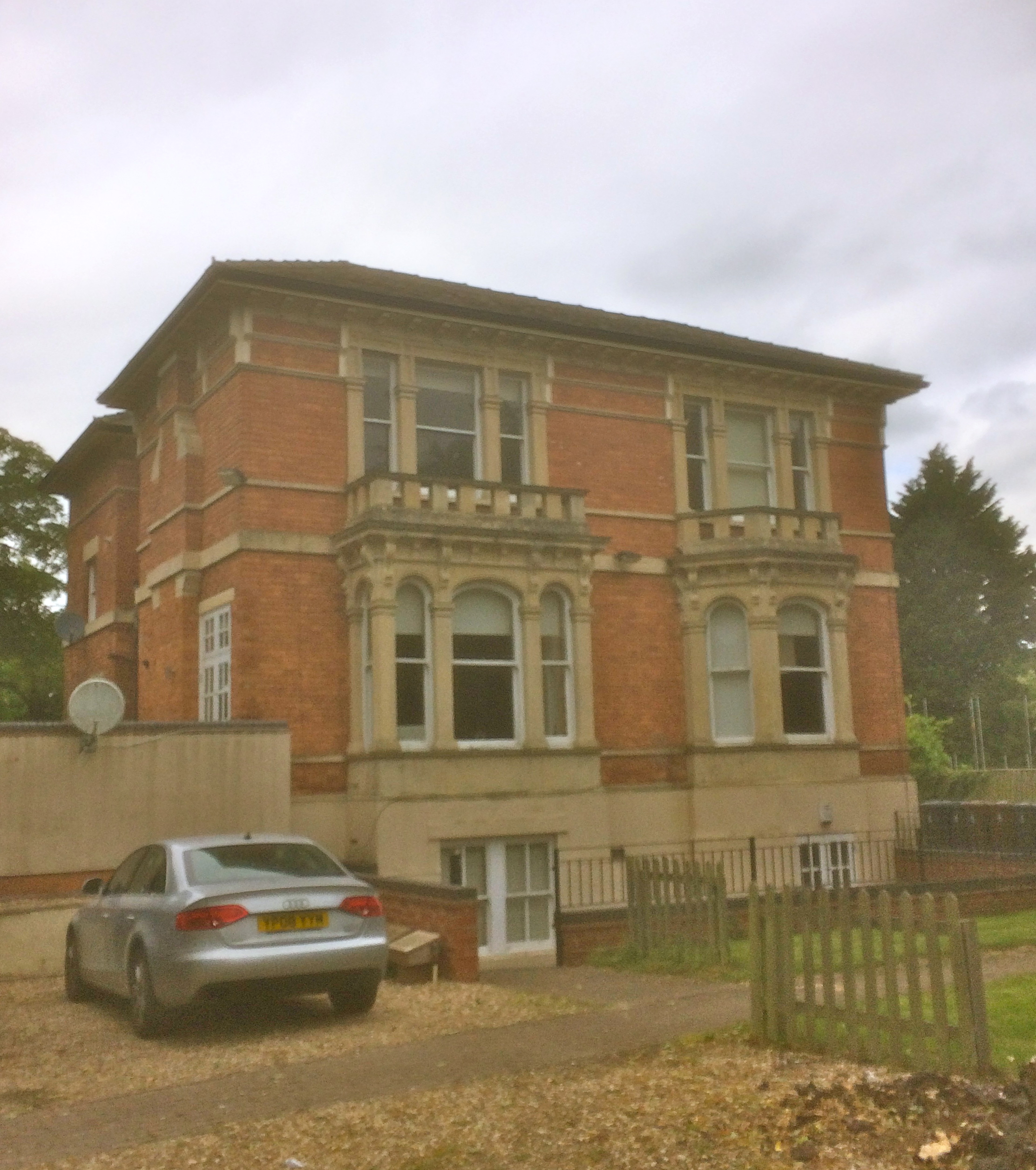
77 South Park Lincoln

- House for William Old. Lindum Terrace, Lincoln. 1864.
- House on the Strait, Lincoln, 1868. Opposite the Jews' Court, built for himself. This appears to be a mis-attribution.
- Hilton Lodge, Union Road, Lincoln. 1871.
- 77 South Park, Lincoln. A house built for the Lincoln industrialist Robert Robey in 1871. This overlooks the South Common.
- Burton Hall, Burton by Lincoln. Alterations and additions for Lord Monson in 1872, including the design of the gates.
- Essendon House, 36 Nettleham Road, Lincoln. Built in 1872 for Miss Barley. A further classroom was added later.
- The Mount, Wragby Road. 1874. Now Minster School Girls Boarding House. Built for G Mears. Brick. Early Queen Anne style.
- Leyland House, 2 The Grove, Nettleham Road, 1875. Watkins' family.home.
- Nettleham Hall, Nettleham. 1876. Destroyed by fire in 1937 and now in ruins.
- Willoughby Hall, Ancaster, 1876. A house designed in 1873 by Watkins for F. W. Allix. In Jacobethan style with shaped gables and showing French renaissance. The house was completed by 1875 at an estimated cost of £28,000. The estate was sold in 1912 and again in 1928 The sale particulars show that it had a lofty hall with four main reception rooms with elaborate carved fireplaces, a smoking room, a broad staircase leading to a first floor with eight main bedrooms and nine bedrooms on the second floor. During World War II it was occupied by the army and was then used for bombing practice by the RAF. It was finally destroyed with dynamite in 1963. The stable block, dated 1876 survives and was converted into a house in 2010.

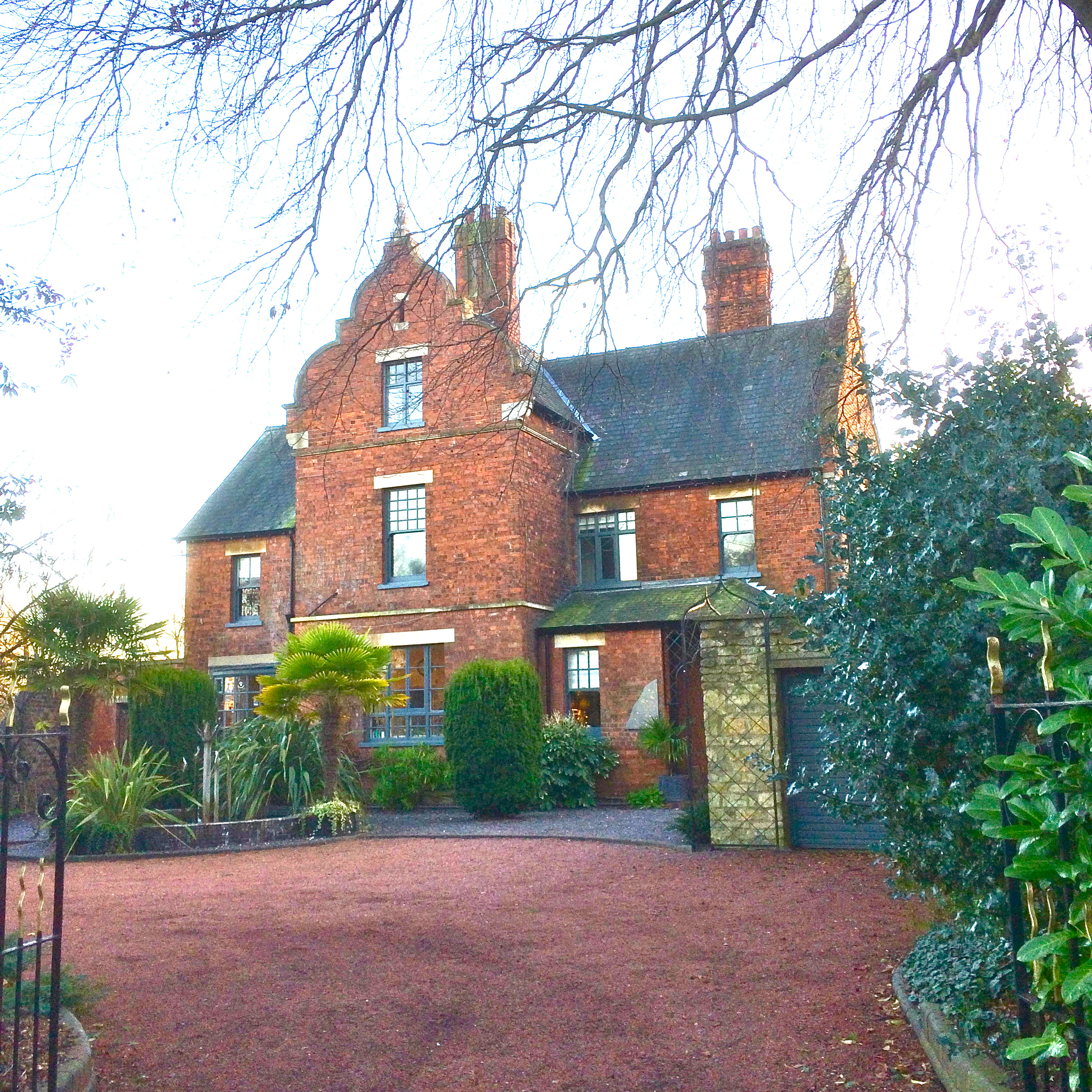
13 Greetwell Road Lincoln

- 13 Greetwell Road, Lincoln 1877. A “villa” residence for Mr T C Lazenby, designed by William Watkins. Brick with shaped Dutch gables.

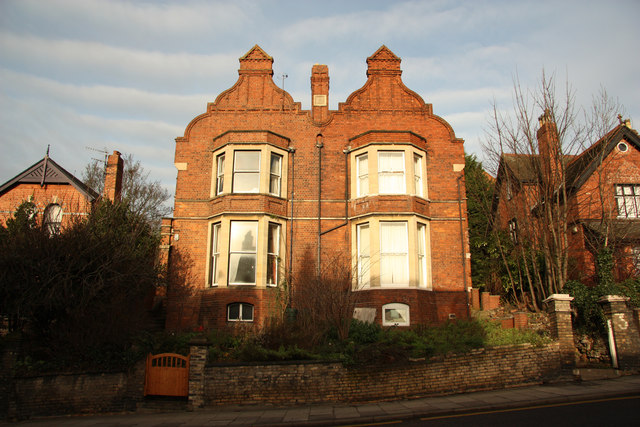
2-3 Temple Gardens, Lindum Road 1877

- 2-3 Temple Gardens, Lindum Road, Lincoln (1877). Built for W. Watson. Brick with prominent shaped or Dutch gables
- Coombehurst, 1 Greetwell Road. Lincoln. 1878. Large house built for Charles Scorer, Clerk to the Lindsey County Council.
- St Nicholas Parsonage, Newport, Lincoln 1879. Built for the Rev F.B. Blenkin for £1950 plus £100 architect's commission. This was replaced in 1912 by the vicarage built for Canon Leeke to the north of St Nicholas Church.
- Highfield Lodge 4 Upper Lindum Street, Lincoln. 1882. Queen Anne Style House

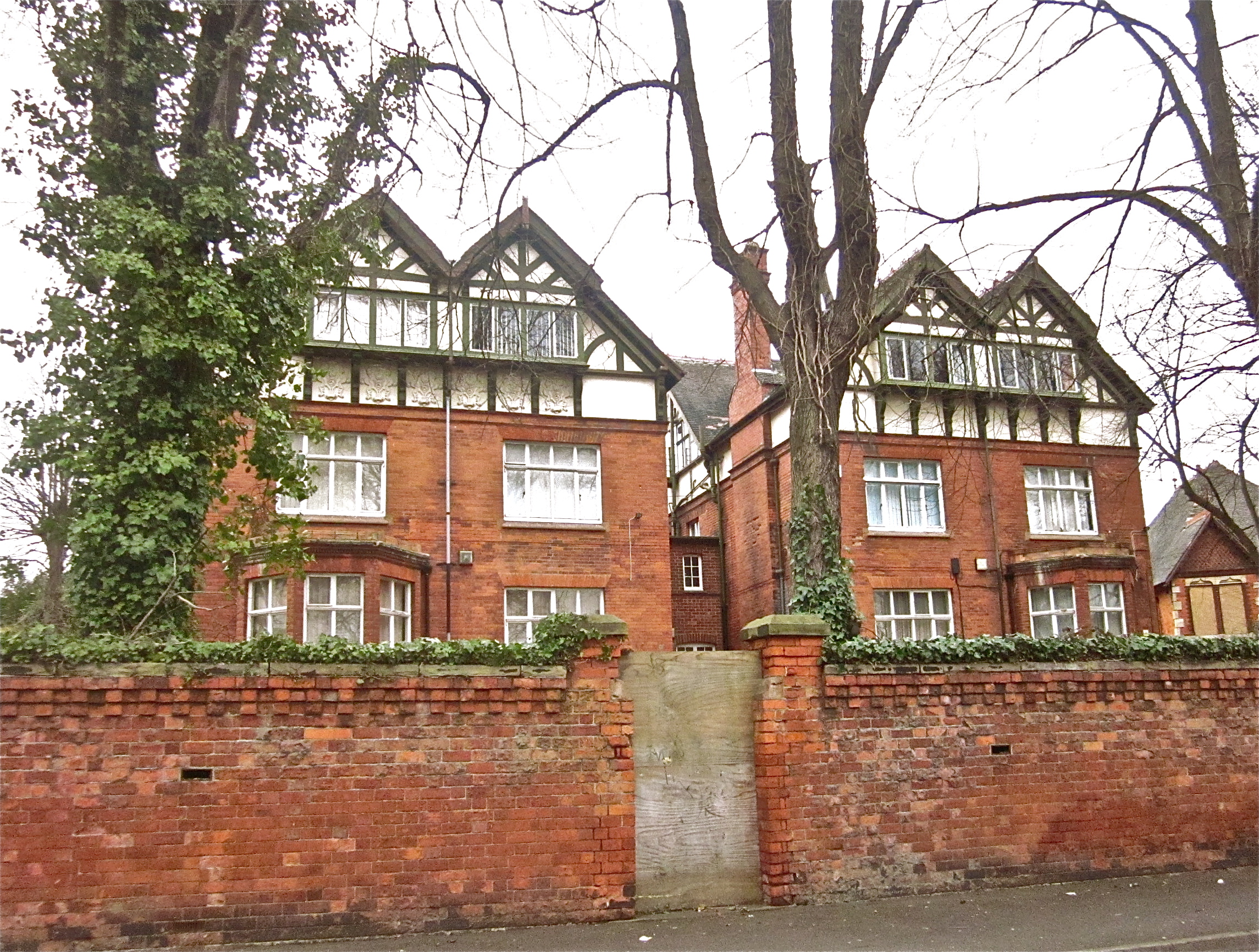
Arts and Crafts Style 9/11 Lindum Terrace by William Watkins, 1896

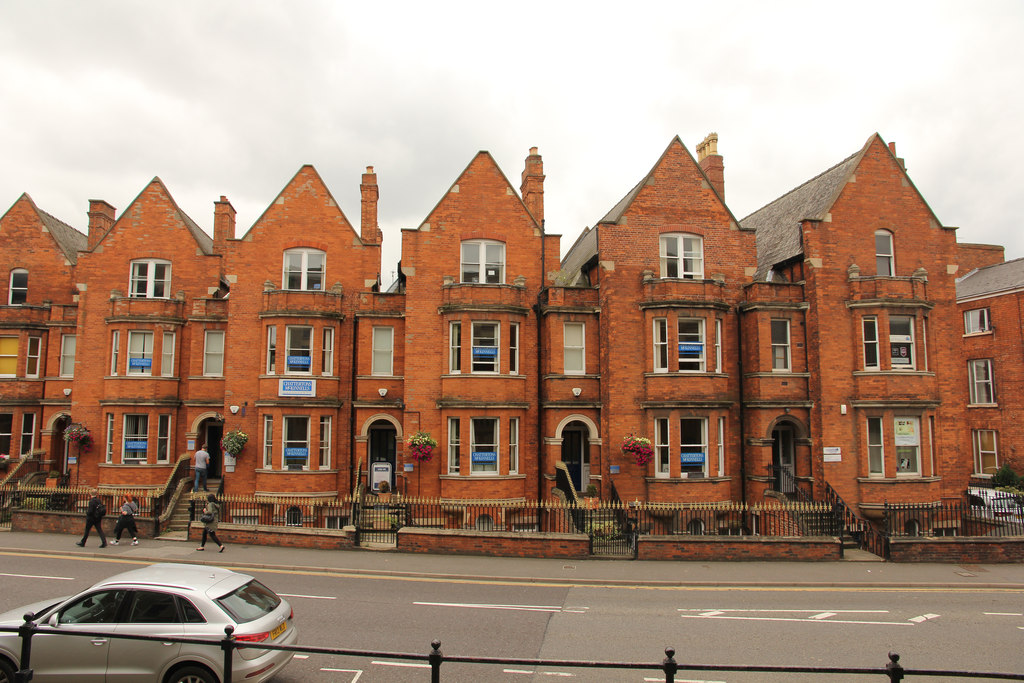
15-25 West Parade 1885

- 1885 15-25 West Parade, Lincoln, Six terraced houses, brick with stone dressings and with original cast iron railings. Each house has three storeys above a sunken basement level with two storeyed balconied bay windows. Each house has a triangular gable and is offset against the next and has an advanced round arched entrance porch with a single bay above. Built for Charles Tomlinson, local chemist and property owner, most are in original condition, complete with boundary walls and railings. Built as town houses but all are now offices.

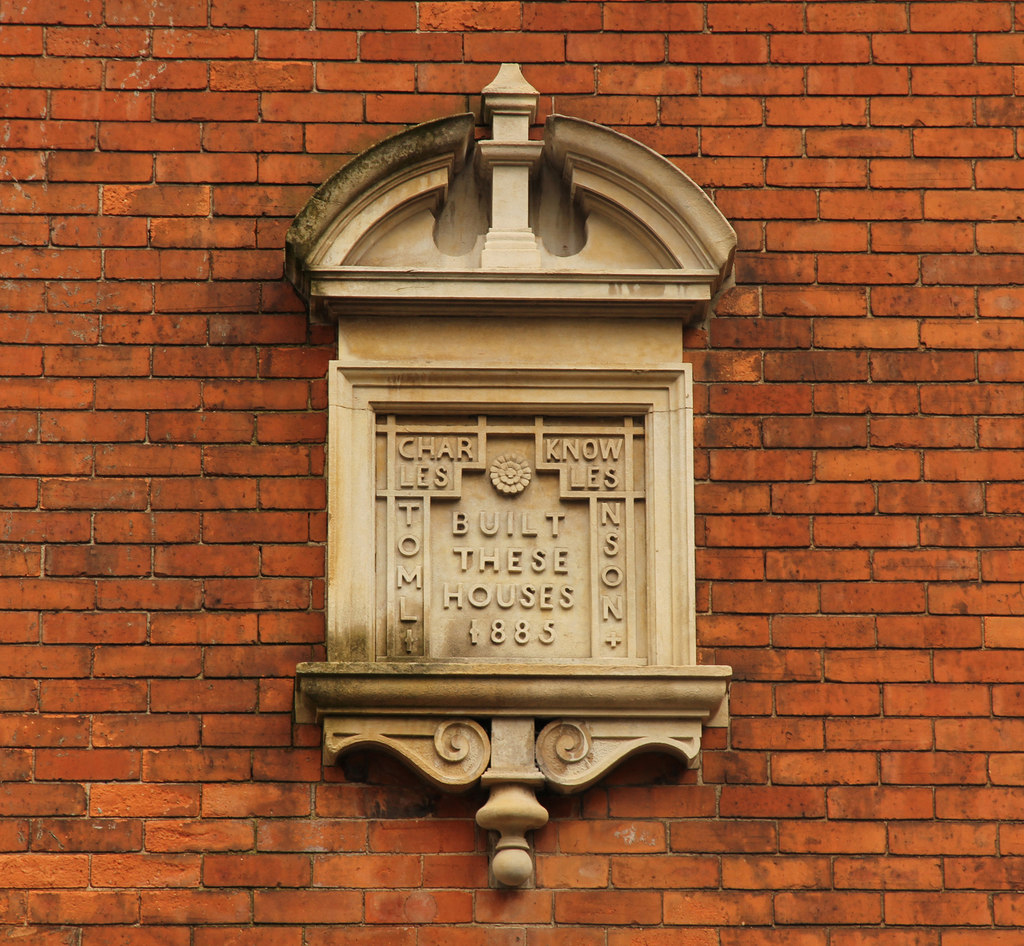
Beaumont Fee datestone 1885

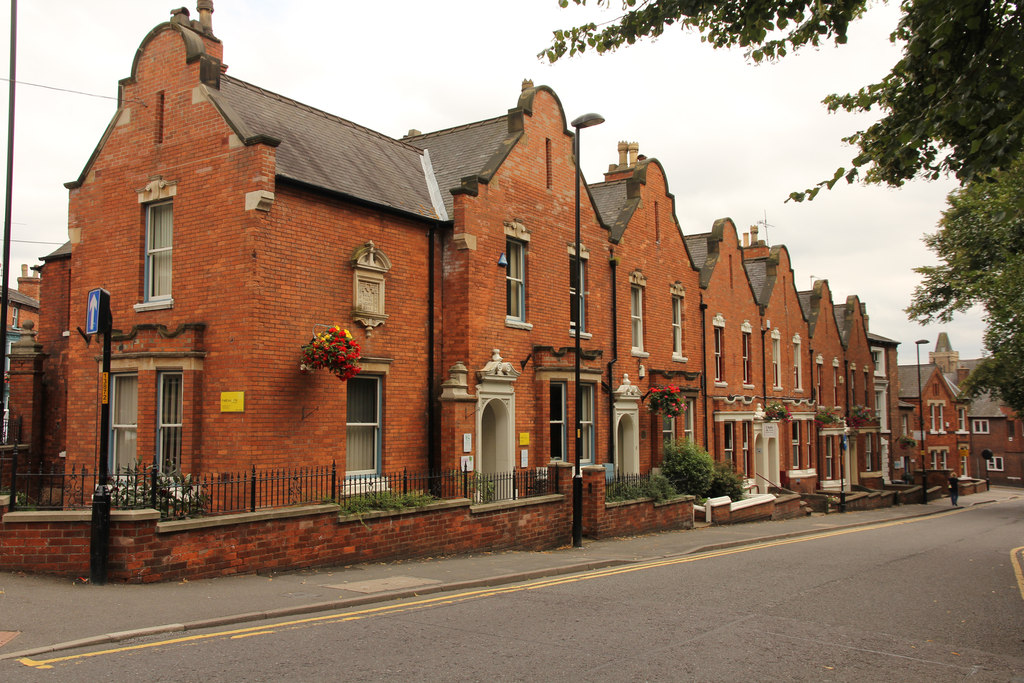
Beaumont Fee 1885

- 5, 7, 9, 11, 13 & 15 Beaumont Fee, Lincoln.(1885) Six terraced brick houses with shaped gables facing the street and no. 15 with a wing with a shaped gable towards West Parade. The houses facing the street have two bays to each gable at first floor level, a single storied bow window, with, at the side, a stuccoed entrance porch with a broken scrolled pediment above. On the wall of the wing to no. 15 is a datestone with the inscription CHARLES KNOWLES TOMLINSON BUILT THESE HOUSES 1885. The architect was William Watkins. Built as town houses but all are now offices

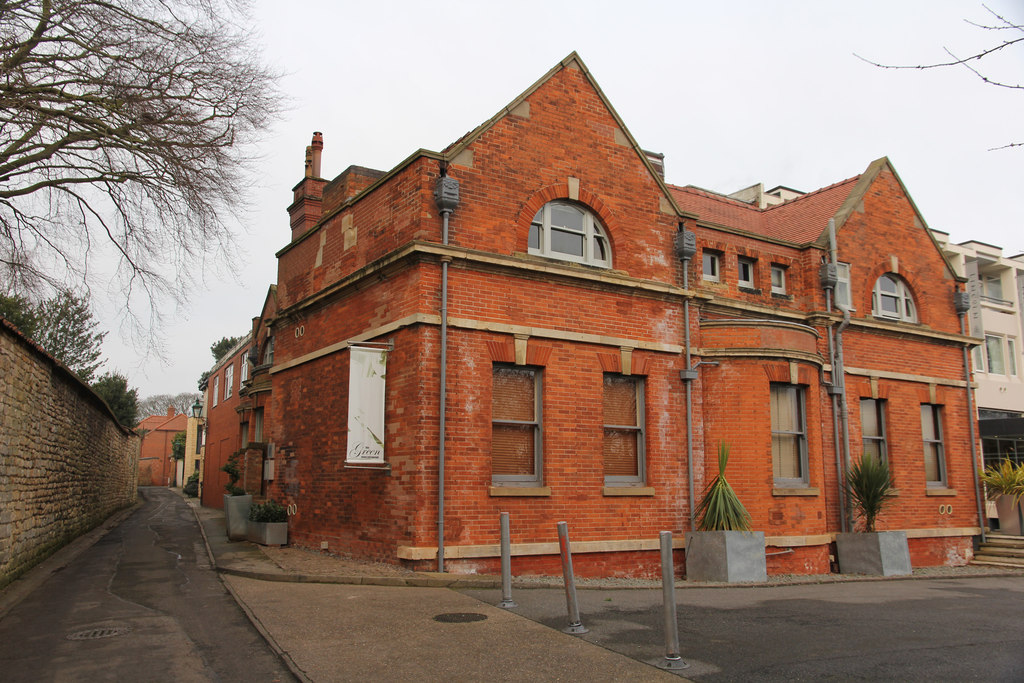
Eastgate House, West wing1888

- Eastgate House, Eastgate. Lincoln. An extension to the Georgian house, originally built for Sir Cecil Wray, which was purchased in 1888 by Alfred Shuttleworth, the son of Joseph Shuttleworth, the co-founder of Clayton and Shuttleworth. The main house was demolished in the 1930s, but the when the Eastgate Hotel (now Lincoln Hotel was built in 1963/65 Watkin's wing was incorporated into the new hotel.
- Canwick House, Canwick, Lincolnshire. 1889. now Canwick House Care Home. Red brick, terracotta, with decorative terracotta panels and gables. Built as Canwick Rectory in a Queen Anne Revival, or Dutch Revival, style.
- 1896. 10/11 Lindum Terrace, Lincoln. Arts and Crafts with timbering and pargeting.

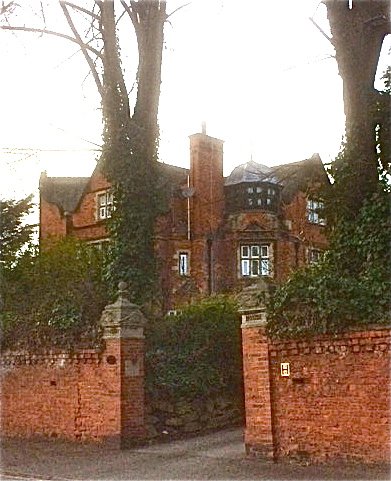
Somerby House, 8 Lindum Terrace, Lincoln 1898

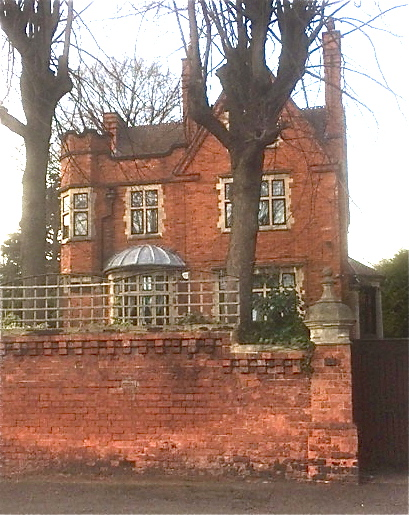
9 Lindum Terrace, Lincoln 1899

- Somerby House, 8 Lindum Terrace. A very large house in a Neo-Elizabethan style on the corner with Eastcliff Road. Designed by Watkins & Sons for W Dawson. The main range set east–west, with radial wings towards the south and the south-west with further ranges to the north. The south-west range has a shaped gable. Domed tower and entrance at the south east, upper part with half timbering and below a pedimented window. Brick with stone dressings.
- 9 Lindum Terrace, Lincoln. 1898. Red brick with stone dressing. Corner tower with crenulated top. Tall chimney stacks and crested ridge tiles. Built for W Dawson. Domed bay windows,

== Literature ==
- Antram N (revised), Pevsner N & Harris J, (1989), The Buildings of England: Lincolnshire, Yale University Press.
- Brodie A. (ed), Directory of British Architects, 1834–1914: 2 Vols, British Architectural Library, Royal Institute of British Architects, 2001.
- Pevsner N & Harris J, (1964), The Buildings of England: Lincolnshire, Penguin, London.
- Scorer S.(introduction), (1990) The Victorian Facade: William Watkins and son, architects, Lincoln 1858-1918 Lincolnshire College of Art and Design. ISBN 0951634003. Booklet to accompany exhibition at the Usher Gallery, Lincoln.
- Stratton, M. (1993) The Terracotta Revival : Building Innovation and the Image of the Industrial City in Britain and North America. London: Gollancz.
- Welsh C. (1983), William Watkins (1834-1926): His Life and Work, Degree dissertation, Nottingham University Department of Architecture.
