= William Gregory Watkins =

English architect

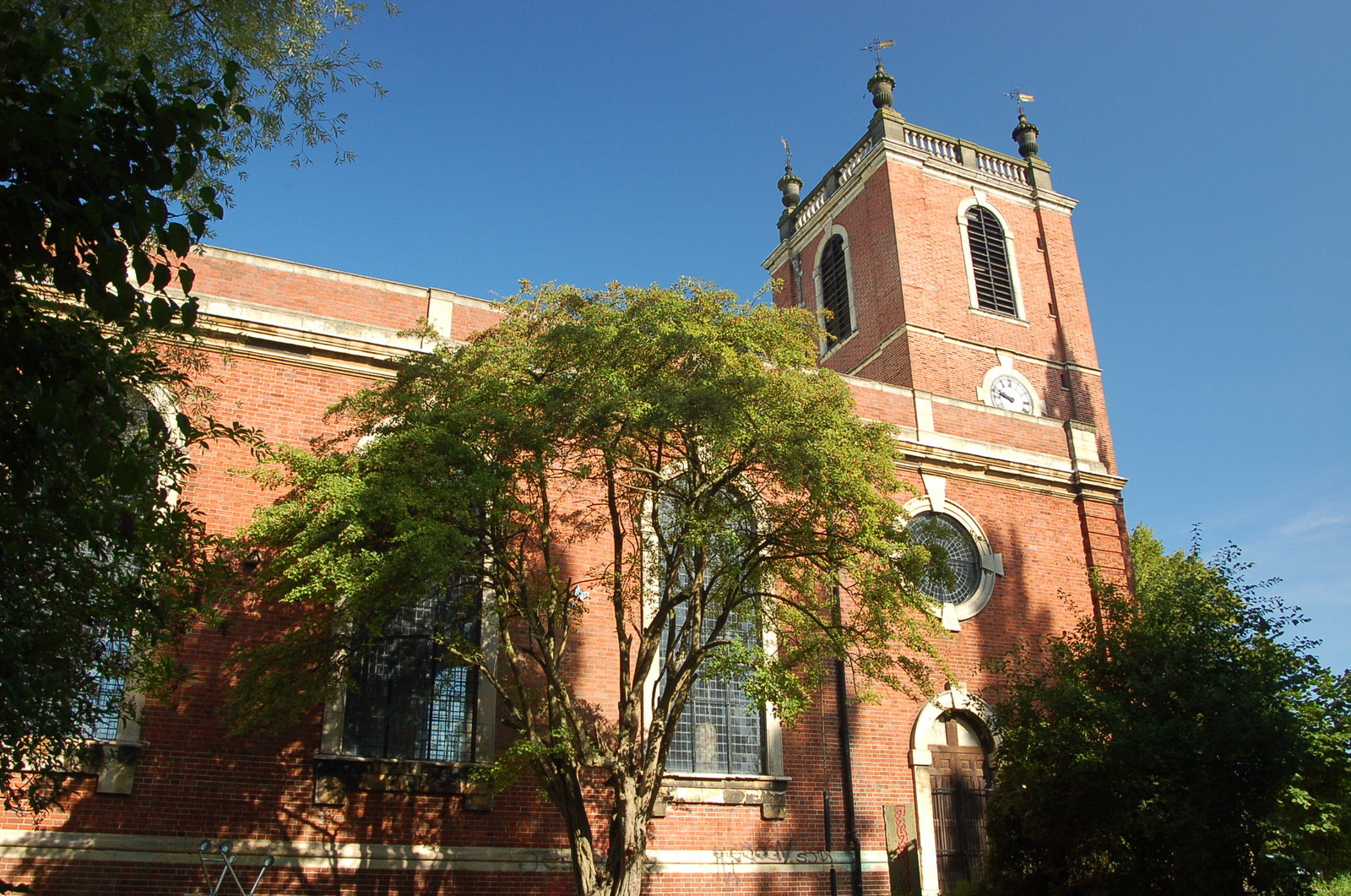
- St Giles Church, Lincoln.
- Born: 1869 ? Lincoln
- Died: 1959 (aged 89–90) ?Lincoln
- Education: Articled to his father William Watkins in 1886
- Occupation: Architect
- Practice: St Edmond's Chamber, Silver Street, then Heslam House 191, High Street Lincoln.
- Buildings: St Giles Church, Lincoln

William Gregory Watkins (1869–1959) was an architect who worked in Lincoln, England. He was the son of the Lincoln architect William Watkins and his younger brother was the Nottingham architect Harry Garnham Watkins. He was a Diocesan surveyor for the Diocese of Lincoln and President of the Nottingham, Derby and Lincoln Society of Architects, 1937–1939. He was elected FRIBA in 1921.

== Career ==
William Gregory Watkins was articled to his father in 1886 and then worked in the architectural practice of White, Elkington and Elkington at 95 Cannon Street, London. He became an ARIBA in 1893 and commenced practice with his father in St Edmond's Chambers in Lincoln in 1897. His father retired from the practice in 1918 and he continued the practice until 1934, when Bob Coombes (1900–1968) became a partner. The practice had moved to Heslam Chambers, 191 High Street, Lincoln by 1959. The practice later moved to 4 Burton Road Lincoln (now the Bronze Pig restaurant), and it ceased operating about 1990.

== Works include ==
- School Chapel, Upper Lindum Street, Lincoln. School chapel built for St Josephs Convent School, architect W G Watkins. Opened 10 October 1923. In Gothic style, constructed in red brick with stone dressings and slate roof. The plan is cruciform and the chapel has tall lancet windows over a lower classroom and store rooms.

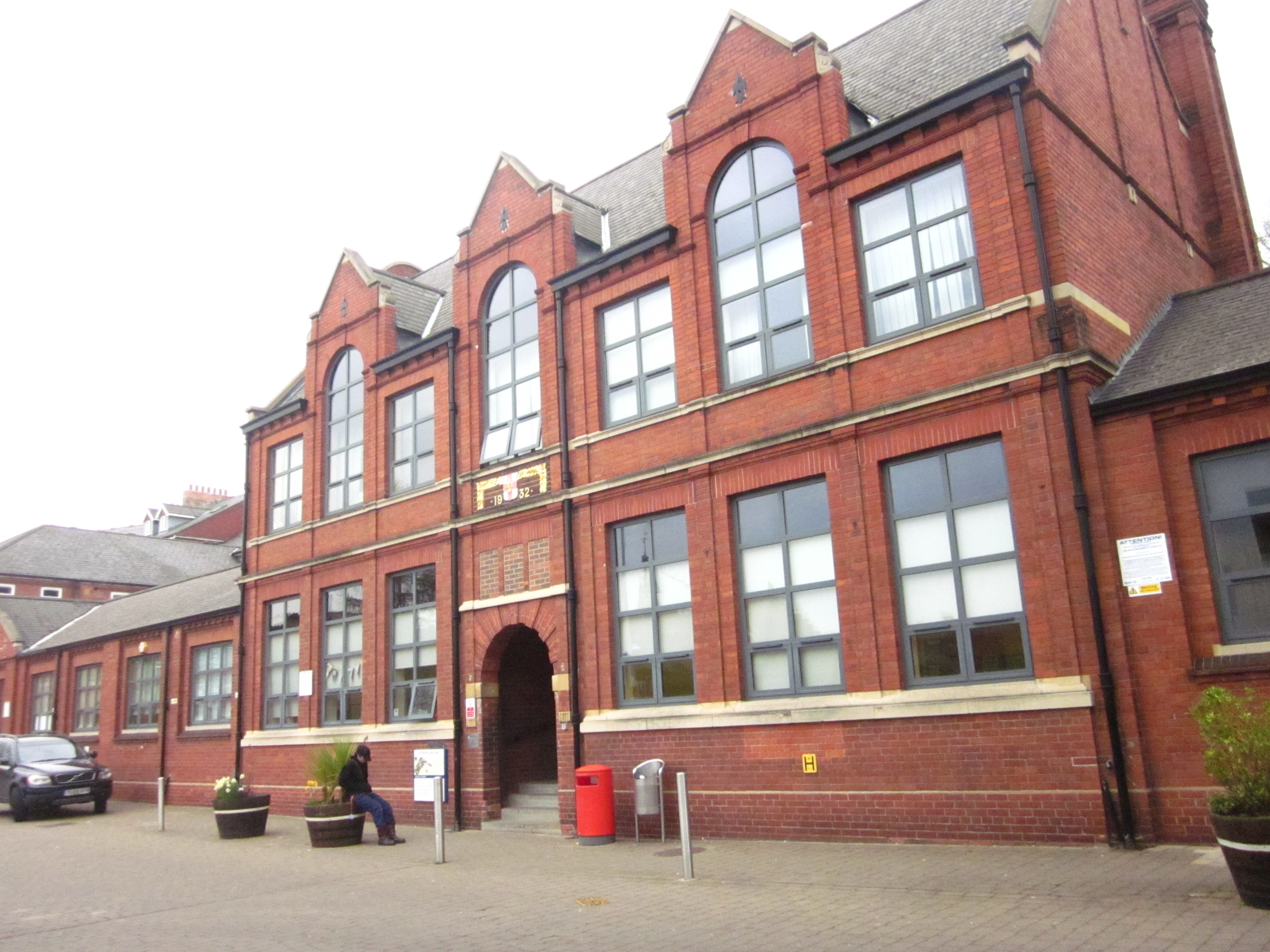
Lincoln College, Lincoln, 1932

- Engineering Buildings, Lincoln Technical College Building, Cathedral Street, Lincoln. 1932. Watkin & Son, designed by W G Watkin. Brick, Neo-Georgian.

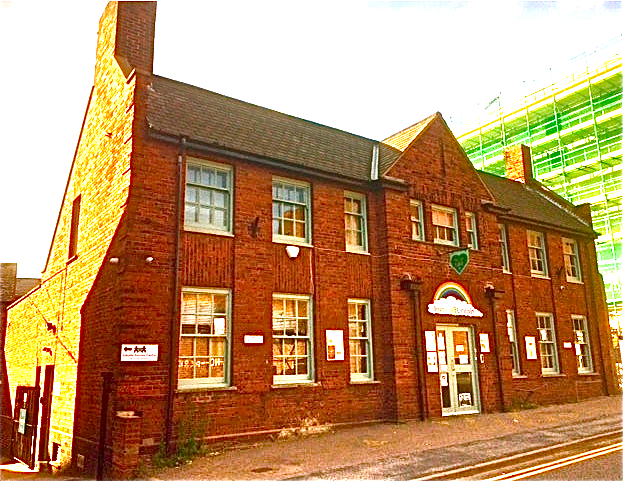
Involve, Mint Lane, Lincoln 1935

- New Public Dispensary, 12 Mint Lane. (1935) Now Involve. This building probably replaced the Lincoln Public Dispensary in Silver Street. Neo-Georgian. Brick with two storeys. Central advanced gabled front with three bays to either side. recessed sash windows with the bricks laid vertically between first and second floor windows. Brick rustication to corners and advanced front.
- Revolution, 10 Park Street Lincoln. 1935. Originally National Farmers Union offices. Brick. Neo-Georgian. Two storeys with roof storey with dormers. Doorway offset at corner with two bays towards Park Street and four forwards Hungate. Five bay later Neo-Georgian extension towards Park street.

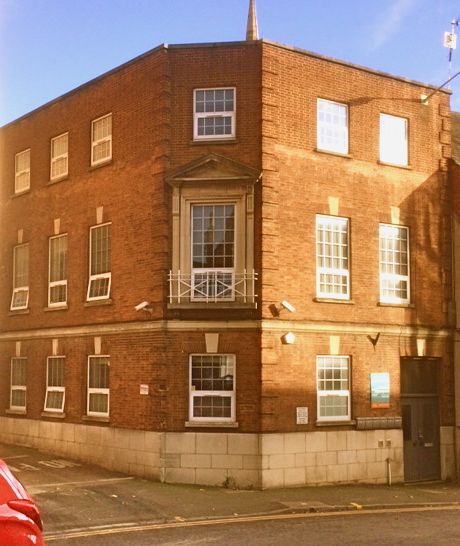
3-4 Bank Street Lincoln 1936

- 3-4 Bank Street Lincoln Offices for Danby Epton & Griffiths 1936

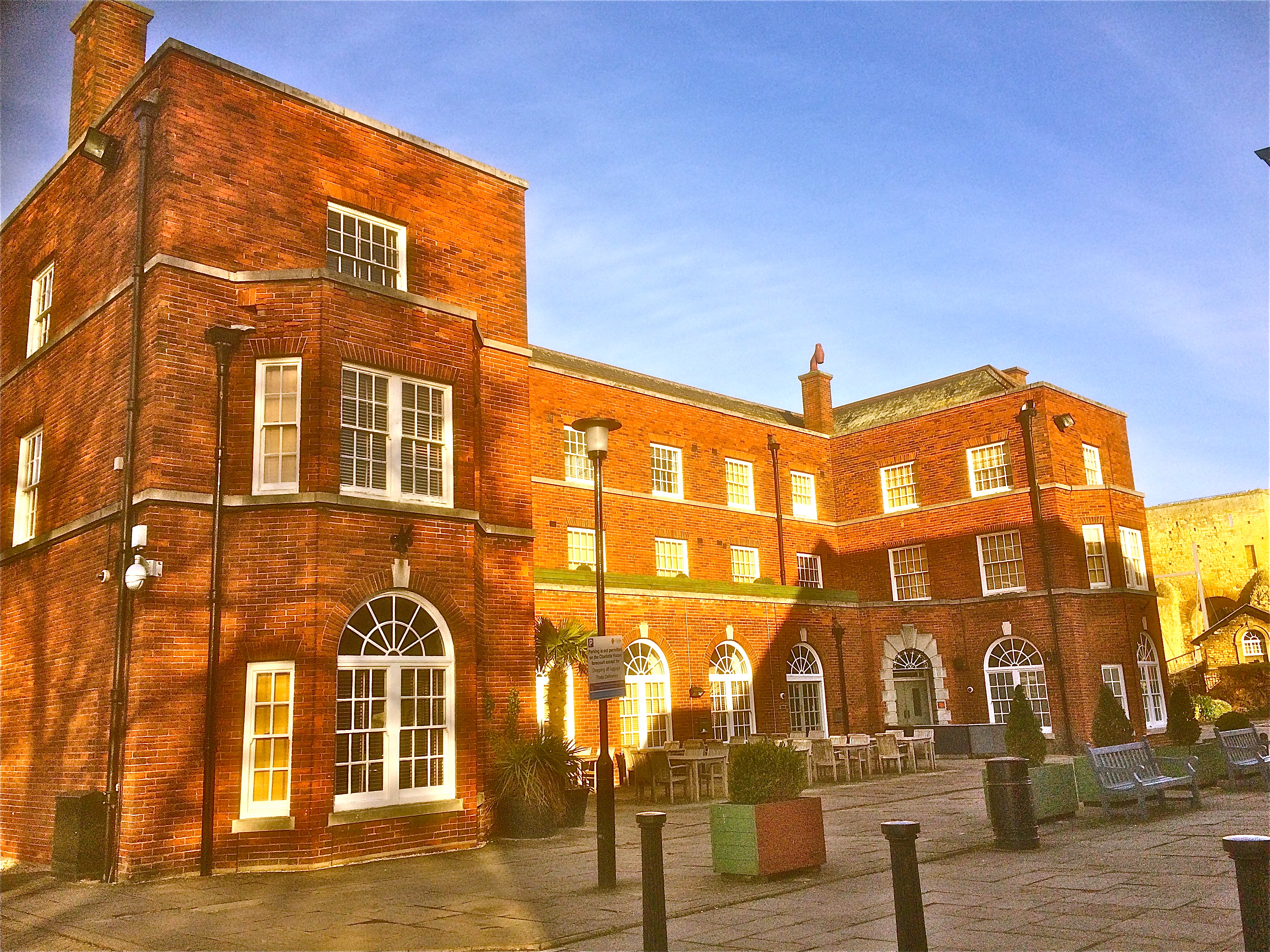
Charlotte House Hotel, Lincoln

- Former Nurses Home, The Lawn, Union Street, Lincoln. Now the Charlotte House Hotel Designed by the Lincoln architects, Watkins and Coombes in 1937

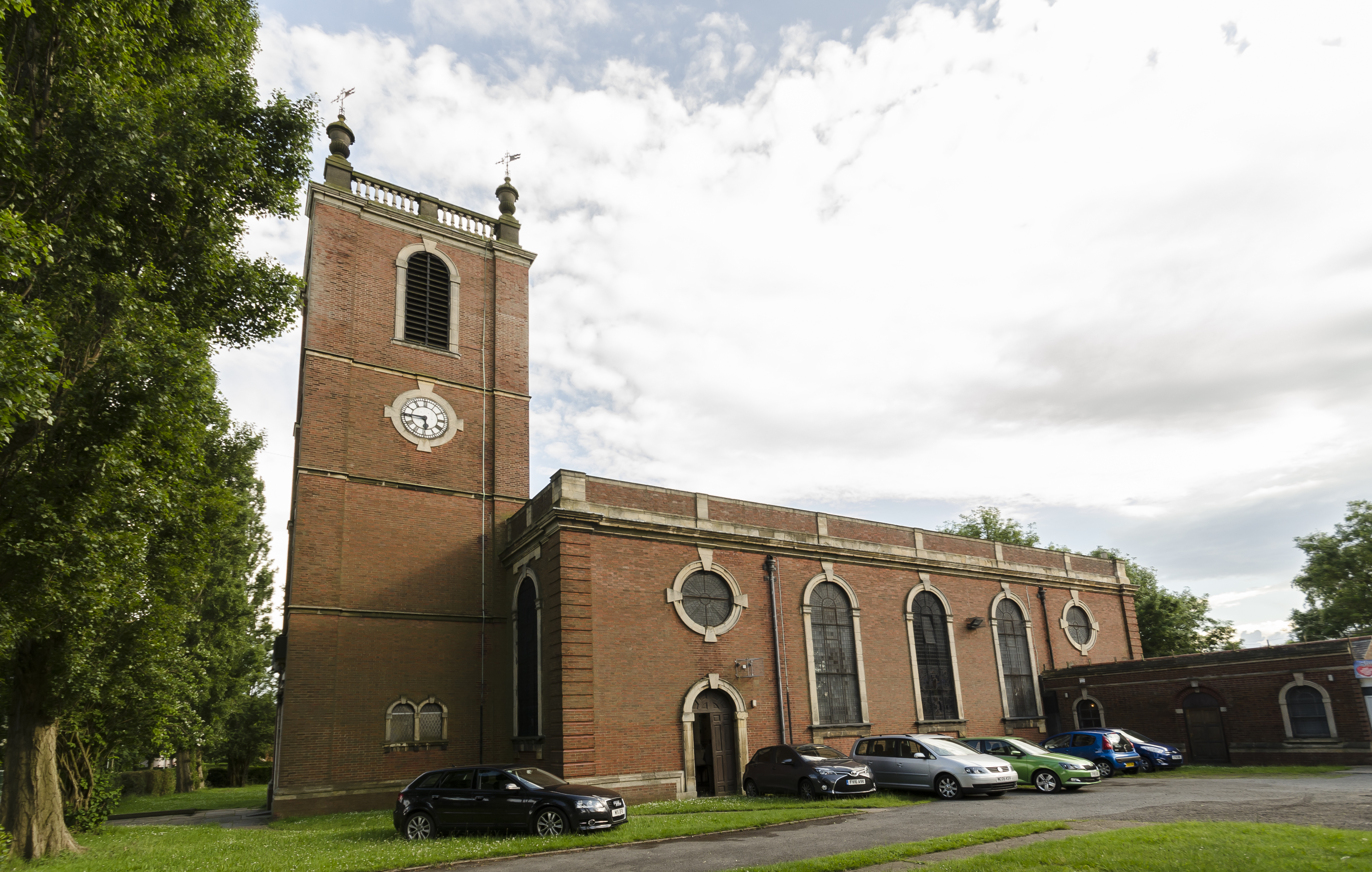
St Giles church, Lincoln

- St Giles Church, Lincoln. Lamb Gardens, 1936. The church was originally designed in 1720 by William Smith as the church of St Peter at Arches, Lincoln. This was demolished in 1930 and re-erected and extended in 1936 by William Watkins of Lincoln. The plan of the rebuilt church was similar but the size was increased by one bay. It is built in 20th century brick with 18th-century ashlar dressings and copper roofs. The church consists of an eastern tower, nave with north and south aisles, a chancel with apps and a north vestry. The top part of the tower has a balustrade with urns at each corner with wind vanes. Most of the windows in the church are round headed. The nave has five bay arcades with Doric piers and round arches with keystones.
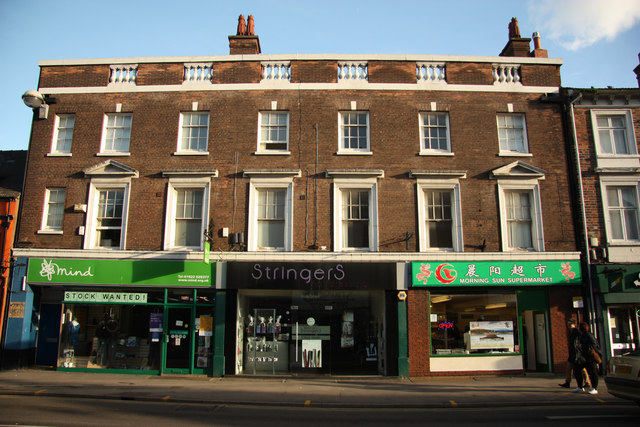
  High Street shops
  At the east end there is a large wooden gallery with the organ. At the west end of the north aisle there is a doorway to the vestry with reset fragments of 12th century stonework. There are some 19th-century stained-glass windows, the other windows are clear.

- 340-341a High Street, Lincoln. Neo-Georgian/Italianate style. Three lock up shops with offices above, built for Lawson Illman & Co Ltd in 1938.

== Literature ==
- Antram N (revised), Pevsner N & Harris J, (1989), The Buildings of England: Lincolnshire, Yale University Press.
- Brodie A. (ed), Directory of British Architects, 1834–1914: 2 Vols, British Architectural Library, Royal Institute of British Architects, 2001.
