= Fred Baker (architect) =

English architect (1874–1936)

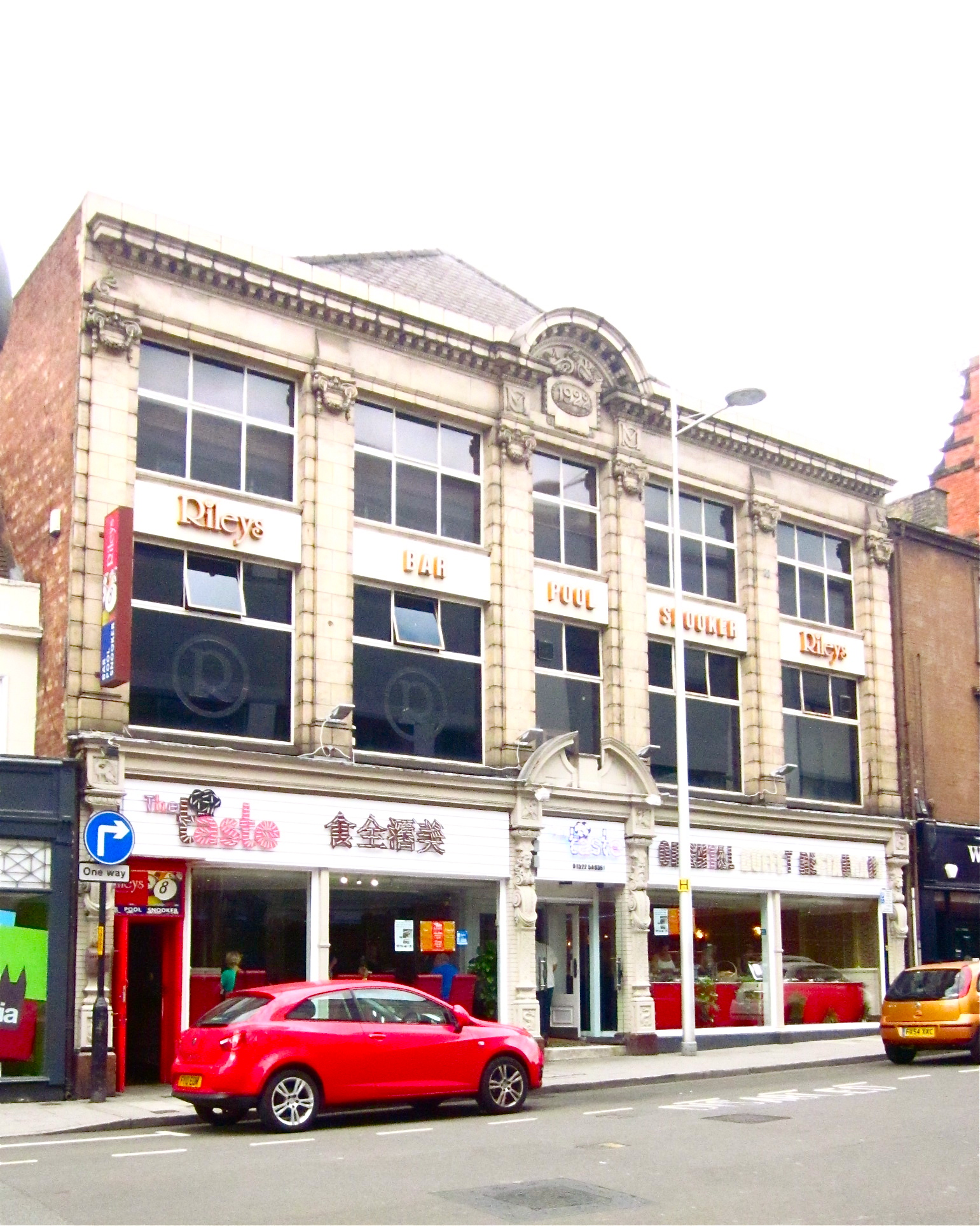
- Curtis and Mawer Department Store 1922.
- Born: 1874; Spilsby, Lincolnshire, England
- Died: 6 March 1936 (aged 61–62); Bloomsbury, London
- Occupation: Architect
- Practice: In Lincoln, Bank Street Chambers in 1910
- Buildings: Curtis and Mawer Department Store

Fred Baker (1874 – 6 March 1936) was an English architect working in Lincoln, Lincolnshire.

== Life ==
Fred Baker was articled to the Lincoln architects Michael Drury in 1890 and to William Watkins from 1891 to 1895. He was then an assistant to the Lincoln architects William Scorer, J. H. Cooper and William Watkins. In 1910 he qualified as LRIBA and had set up his own practice in Lincoln by 1918 and continued working until 1935. Most of the work he undertook was in housing development in Lincoln. His son was Tom Baker, Director of Lincoln Libraries, Museum and Art Gallery, until 1974.

== Work ==
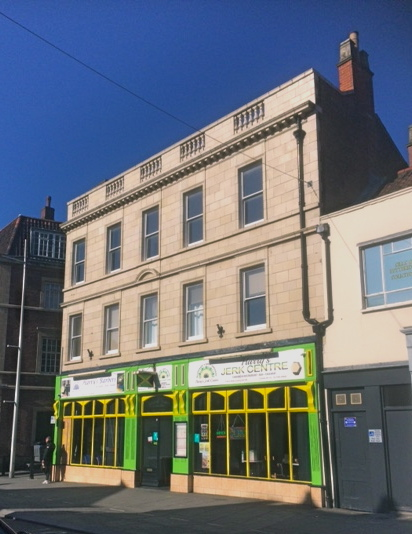
47 & 48 Silver Street, Lincoln 1920

- 47 & 48 Silver Street. St Peter's Chamber. Recently Zucchini's. Offices and showrooms. 1920. White faced glazed terracotta, by one of the Lancashire manufacturers such as Shaw's Glazed Brick Company of Darwen, Lancashire. An Italianate/Neo Georgian design by the Three storeys facing Silver Street with five bays, corner bay, corner bay, and two bays facing St Peter's Court.
- Former Curtis & Mawer Department Store, later Courts. Silver Street, Lincoln. 1922. The building is faced in white Doulton Carrara Ware Terracotta which was produced at the Doulton brickworks at Rowley Regis in Warwickshire. Examples of use of Carrara ware include the old Debenhams in Wigmore Street and the Russell Hotel in Russell Square in London. In Birmingham it was used in the Great Western arcade and Turkey Café in Leicester and also in the Everard Building in Bristol. Figure work on these buildings was often designed by Henry Charles Fehr (1867-1940). Other possible examples of Doulton's Carrara facing in Lincoln are the old Post Office in Guildhall Street and Zucchinis, at 47 Silver Street. Pevsner remarks the building is a modest example of the department store style developed from Selfridges in London. White giant terracotta giant pilasters with swags and modillion cornice. Termini caryatids support the ground floor. MC monograms for Curtis and Mawer are placed below the cornice. This building is an example of Inter-war years architecture when Lincoln was trying to establish itself as a regional shopping. centre
