= Scores =

Scores may refer to:

- Scores New York, a strip club in New York
- Scores (album), a 2004 album by Barry Manilow
- Scores, an album by Welsh band Hybrid
- Scores (computer virus), a computer virus affecting Macintosh computers
- Scores (restaurant), a restaurant chain in Canada
- Scores on the doors, a term for published and displayed food hygiene results
- The Scores, a neighbourhood in St Andrews, Scotland

== See also ==
- SCORE (disambiguation)
- Score (disambiguation)
- The Score (disambiguation)
