= KQAC =

Classical radio station in Portland, Oregon

- Portland, Oregon; United States
- Broadcast area: Northwest Oregon; Southwest Washington
- Frequency: 89.9 MHz (HD Radio)
- Branding: All Classical Radio

Programming
- Format: Classical music
- Subchannels: HD2: ICAN International Children's Arts Network; HD3: Community (KXRY)
- Affiliations: APM; NPR

Ownership
- Owner: All Classical Public Media, Inc.

History
- First air date: August 1, 1983
- Former call signs: KBPS-FM (1983–2009)
- Call sign meaning: "Quality All Classical"

Technical information
- Licensing authority: FCC
- Facility ID: 59343
- Class: C1
- ERP: 5,900 watts
- HAAT: 440 meters (1,440 ft)
- Transmitter coordinates: 45°30′59″N 122°43′58″W
- Translator: See § Repeater stations
- Repeater: See § Repeater stations

Links
- Public license information: Public file; LMS
- Webcast: Listen Live
- Website: www.allclassical.org; icanradio.org (HD2)

KQAC (89.9 FM, "All Classical Radio") is a non-commercial radio station licensed to Portland, Oregon, United States. KQAC is owned by All Classical Public Media, Inc., a non-profit 501(c)(3) organization. It airs a classical music format, broadcasting from studios in the KOIN Tower in downtown Portland.

The transmitter is atop the KOIN-TV tower in the Sylvan-Highlands section of Portland. KQAC broadcasts using HD Radio technology, with several digital subchannels. The station's live stream is available through its mobile app. Programming is also heard on a network of repeater stations and FM translators.

== Programming ==
Programs produced by KQAC include:

- Saturday Matinee: Saturday host Warren Black plays a mix of opera, show tunes, film themes, comic operettas, and American band music.
- The Concert Hall: John Pitman hosts a show of orchestral concert recordings.
- Sunday Brunch: Hosted by Kate Remington.
- The Score: Host Edmund Stone explores classical music used in film. This program is syndicated in several cities in the United States and internationally. (Airing only reruns since September 2026.)
- Northwest Previews: Andrea Murray hosts a five-minute program every Friday highlighting local arts events for the upcoming weekend and week ahead.
- Club Mod: Host Andrea Murray explores modernism, past and present, on this two-hour Saturday night show.
- Played in Oregon: Host Brandi Parisi celebrates the classical music scene in Oregon with a one-hour program each Sunday.
- Thursdays @ Three: Hosted by Christa Wessel, Thursdays @ Three broadcasts live performances of local and visiting artists.

Syndicated programs aired on KQAC include Composers Datebook and Metropolitan Opera.

== Financial support ==
KQAC and its sister stations rely on donations from their communities. 93% of All Classical's financial support comes directly from listeners, nonprofit arts organizations, businesses and foundations in Portland, Vancouver, the Central Oregon Coast, and the Columbia River Gorge.

Additionally, a small portion of the station's annual budget comes from various foundation grants and from the Corporation for Public Broadcasting. There is also extensive volunteer support and an internship program. All Classical holds on-air fundraisers several times each year and seeks donations on its website.

== Community outreach ==
=== JOY (Joyous Outreach to You/th) ===
In Fall 2017, All Classical Portland launched JOY. JOY (Joyous Outreach to You/th) is All Classical Radio's outreach initiative consisting of five programs:

- Youth Roving Reporters
- Artist In Residence
  - 2019 Artist in Residence: Hunter Noack, pianist
  - 2019 Young Artist in Residence: Taylor Yoon, cellist
- Where We Live: a bi-monthly radio program
- Night Out: an event series

=== Music feeds ===
In Fall 2017, in association with its annual Fall fundraiser, All Classical Portland partnered with Olson & Jones Construction and the Oregon Food Bank to help provide meals to those in need. Throughout September 2017, each donation made to All Classical Portland triggered a third-party donation from Olson & Jones Construction directly to the Oregon Food Bank, which provided over 30,000 meals to individuals and families in need. All Classical Portland repeated this partnership in 2018.

== History ==
=== KPBS-FM ===
In 1983, Portland Public Schools applied for a license to create an FM station. The school system already owned KBPS 1450 AM, but as the FM band became more popular, KBPS wanted an FM station too. Reed College's KRRC (now KXRY) agreed to shift its dial position slightly, freeing up 89.9 to become the frequency for a new non-commercial Portland FM station.

KBPS-FM signed on the air on August 1, 1983. Programming on weekdays included NPR news shows Morning Edition and All Things Considered. On weekends, syndicated programming included Pipedreams and the Minnesota Orchestra. Educational shows were also on the schedule. In KBPS-FM's early years, all programming was pre-recorded.

By the mid-1980s, station production assistant Tania Thompson began live announcing during the morning hours. In 1986, John Pitman, a recent Benson Polytechnic High School graduate, began live announcing during the early evening hours. A third announcer was hired to work throughout the night beginning in 1988, eventually transforming All Classical 89.9 FM into a 24-hour classical music station.

The continued growth of the two KBPS stations, one on AM and one on FM, caused a space crisis. At the time, station manager Patricia Swenson and a team of community leaders initiated a campaign to build a new broadcast center with private funds. It was completed in 1992.

Before the new broadcast center was completed, Oregon Ballot Measure 5 was passed. It authorized limits on property tax rates in the state. As a result, the Portland Public Schools district faced severe budget cuts, which in turn decreased funding to KBPS-AM-FM. Operating cuts caused NPR membership to be discontinued in 1993, and volunteers took a more active role in the station's operations. Pledge drives became the most viable option for the survival of the two non-commercial stations.

=== Change in ownership ===
In 2003, Portland Public Schools announced that it was selling the license for KBPS-FM, while keeping the AM station. The KBPS Public Radio Foundation purchased the Federal Communications Commission (FCC) broadcast license, ensuring that classical music would stay on the airwaves in Portland. The total for the license was $5.5 million, payable over time. The final payment of $337,500 was made on December 14, 2012, certifying the organization as debt-free.

KBPS-FM increased its power from 3,700 watts to 5,200 watts in January 2011. It made a slight increase to 5,900 watts in May 2011. The power boosts extended coverage in the Portland area by ten miles in all directions and improved reception for listeners.

=== KQAC ===
All Classical's identity and brand may have suffered due to the station's past relationship with Portland Public Schools. There was also a common misconception that KBPS-FM was part of Oregon Public Broadcasting, which owns a chain of news-talk stations around the state. In 2009, CEO Jack Allen proposed returning the KBPS call sign back to Portland Public Schools. (The BPS in KBPS stands for Benson Polytechnic School, one of Portland's high schools.)

As a result, and in order to avoid confusion, 89.9 FM changed its call letters to KQAC (with the AC standing for All Classical). The licensee of KQAC changed its official name from the KBPS Public Radio Foundation to All Classical Public Media, Inc. This reflects the change of ownership and the new call letters.

In 2012, Allen took additional steps to assure independence and brand clarity by engaging Jelly Helm, formerly of Wieden + Kennedy, to design a new identity and positioning statement. The final result was the branding "All Classical Portland – we love this music."

=== Hampton Opera Center ===
In late 2012, the station began the search for a new facility, a home for the next 10 to 20 years. All Classical Portland had long outgrown the facility designed in 1983, which lacked adequate working, meeting, creative and performance space.

In 2014, All Classical Portland moved to its new home in the Hampton Opera Center on the east bank of the Willamette River, just south of OMSI and adjacent to Portland's new Tilikum Crossing, Bridge of the People. The new facility matches the needs of the organization and includes a new performance space, the Roger O. Doyle Performance studio, which also is home to Thursdays @ Three, a weekly feature.

=== Adding listeners ===
Over the 2015-2016 year, All Classical saw a 22% increase in weekly cumulative listeners according to data published by the Radio Research Consortium and Nielsen Audio. As of 2018, All Classical grew its audience by 35% over the preceding four years. The station has the largest per capita market share of any classical music station in the country.

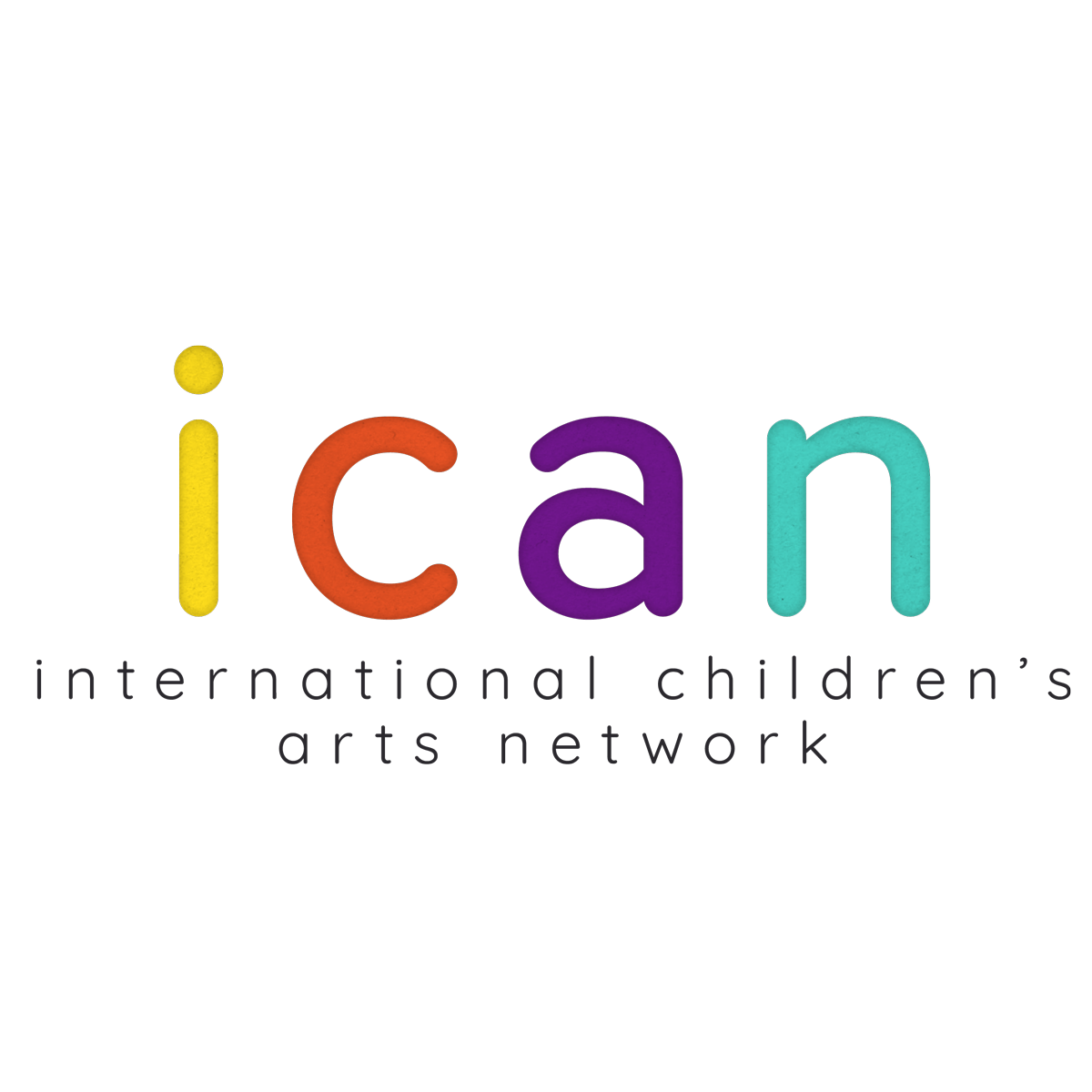
ICAN logo

On April 15, 2019, KQAC launched "ICAN", the International Children's Arts Network. The network is heard on KQAC's HD2 subchannel. The same is true for KQHR and KQOC's HD2 subchannels.

In August 2023, the radio station announced a rebranding from "All Classical Portland" to "All Classical Radio." The reason was to reflect the station's "flourishing global reach."

=== KOIN Tower ===
In December 2024, All Classical completed its move from the Hampton Opera Center to the KOIN Tower in Downtown Portland. The new facility covers 15,000 square feet (1,400 square meters), 3,000 sq. ft. more than its previous home, and more room to develop content for its 24-hour classical programming streaming worldwide.

In addition to state-of-the-art broadcast and recording studios, the new headquarters also include a 100-seat performance hall and an acoustically-sealed-off production studio for podcasts and rehearsals. The price tag was $11 million. Donations included the largest grant in the station's 40-year history, $750,000 from the M.J. Murdock Charitable Trust of Vancouver.

== Repeater stations ==
The station launched its first repeater, KQHR 90.1 FM, in the Hood River area in 2001. KQHR is the first radio station in the Columbia River Gorge to have HD digital transmission.

In May 2008, the station launched its second repeater station, KQOC 88.1 FM in Gleneden Beach. It rebroadcasts KQAC's programming in Lincoln City and Newport on the Oregon coast. The KQOC signal reaches Tillamook and Cannon Beach to the north and Yachats to the south.

In the Fall of 2011, KQAC added an HD-only repeater station in McMinnville, Oregon. Also in 2011, KQHR moved from 90.1 FM to a stronger signal at 88.1 FM. KQOC moved to a new 150-foot tower and commenced broadcasting with a stronger signal on January 17, 2013.

In April 2014, KQAC added a repeater station, KQMI 88.9 FM in Manzanita, Oregon, and October 2014 saw the addition of a repeater translator in Corvallis, Oregon, at 95.7 FM.

Transmitter	Location	Power (measured in watts)
KQAC 89.9	Portland/Vancouver	5,900
KQOC 88.1	Gleneden Beach	8,800
KQMI 88.9	Manzanita	190
KQHR 88.1	Hood River/The Dalles and K242AX 96.3 The Dalles	3,600
KSLC 90.3	McMinnville	750
K239BP 95.7	Corvallis/Flynn	15.5
K242AX 96.3	Columbia Gorge East	250

== See also ==
- List of FM radio stations in the United States by call sign (initial letters KQ–KS)
