= Score =

Score or scorer may refer to:

- Test score, the result of an exam or test

== Business ==
- Score Digital, now part of Bauer Radio
- Score Entertainment, a former American trading card design and manufacturing company
- Score Media, a former Canadian media company
- SCORE (Service Corps of Retired Executives), a business advisory organization

== Mathematics ==
- Score (statistics), a quantity in statistics
- Score (number), a quantity of twenty units
- Raw score, an original datum that has not been transformed
- Score test, a statistical test
- Scorer's function, solutions to differential equations
- Scoring rule, measuring the accuracy of probabilistic predictions
- Standard score, a quantity derived from the raw score

== Science and technology ==
- Single colour reflectometry (SCORE), an optical technique for monitoring biomolecular interactions

== Arts, entertainment, and media ==
- Event score, written or printed instructions for a visual art performance

=== Films ===
- Score (1974 film), an American adult film
- Score: A Hockey Musical, a 2010 Canadian musical
- Score: A Film Music Documentary (2016)

=== Music ===
- Score, a sheet music format in which simultaneous parts are vertically aligned
- Film score, original music written to accompany a film
- Piano–vocal score, a publishing format combining sung parts and a keyboard arrangement
- Theatre score, the physical embodiment of theatre music, including lyrics
- Video game music, also known as the game's score
- SCORE (software), for creating and editing sheet music

=== Bands ===
- The Score (band), an alternative indie rock band

==== Albums ====
- Score (Randy Brecker album), 1969
- Score (Paul Haslinger album), 1999
- Score (Carol Lloyd album), 1979
- Score (Duncan Mackay album), 1977
- The Score (Fugees album), 1996
- Score (Dream Theater album), 2006
- Score (2Cellos album), 2017

=== Periodicals ===
- Score, a football comic which became Scorcher in 1971
- Score, a pornographic magazine by The Score Group

=== Television ===
- Score (television), a weekend sports service of the defunct Financial News Network
- Score (talk show), or SCORE, a Pakistani sports talk show

== Sports and games ==
- Score (game), a number of points achieved in a game
- Score (sport), a number of points achieved in a sporting event
- Scoring in association football
- Baseball scoring, recording the events of a baseball game
- Scoring (cricket)
- Herb Score (1933–2008), baseball player
- Score, a 1977 video game and reskin of Death Race

== People ==
- Ali Score, member of British band A Flock of Seagullls
- David A. Score (retired 2017), American rear admiral
- Herb Score (1933-2008), American baseball player and announcer
- Mike Score (born 1957), English musician
- Roberta Score, American geologist

== See also ==
- Dance score (disambiguation)
- Orchestration, musical scoring
- Point (disambiguation)
- SCORE (disambiguation)
- Scorer (disambiguation)
- Scores (disambiguation)
- The Score (disambiguation)
- Score following, the process of tracking the position in the score of a live music performance
- Scoreboard, a large board for displaying the score in a game
- Score bug, an on-screen TV graphic displayed during sports game broadcasts
- Scorecard (disambiguation)
- Score sheet, used to record a chess game in progress
- Underscoring, background music in a film
- Underscore, incidental music accompanying some other artistic work
