= SCORE =

SCORE may refer to:

- SCORE (software), a music scorewriter program
- SCORE! Educational Centers
- SCORE International, Southern California Off Road Enthusiasts, an offroad racing organization
- Sarawak Corridor of Renewable Energy, a regional development corridor in Malaysia
- Singapore Corporation of Rehabilitative Enterprises, the former name of Yellow Ribbon Singapore, a statutory board under the Ministry of Home Affairs
- Signal Communications by Orbiting Relay Equipment, a communications satellite
- Service Corps of Retired Executives, a mentorship program affiliated with the Small Business Administration

== See also ==
- Score (disambiguation)
- The Score (disambiguation)
- Scores (disambiguation)
