= Scorer =

Scorer may refer to:

- A person who keeps track of scores:
  - Scoring (cricket), recorder of runs in a cricket match
  - Official scorer (baseball), recorder of runs in a baseball game
  - Official scorer, a kind of official in ice hockey
- A scorer can also be a person who scores a goal (or similar) in a game of sport
- Composer of a film score

== People with the surname ==
- Bob Scorer (1898–1971), English footballer
- Catherine Scorer (1947–1986), English solicitor and author
- Mischa Scorer (1939–2023), British documentary film-maker
- Reginald Scorer (1892–1976), English cricketer
- Richard S. Scorer (1919–2011), British meteorologist
- Sam Scorer (1923–2003), English architect
- William Scorer (1843–1934), English architect

== See also ==
- Score (disambiguation)
- Automatic scorer, a computerised scoring system
- Scorer and Gamble, English architectural practice
- Scorer's function, studied by R. S. Scorer
