= Gail F. Goodman =

- Occupation(s): Chairman, President, and Chief Executive Officer of Constant Contact

Gail F. Goodman is the former Chairman, President, and Chief Executive Officer of the online marketing company, Constant Contact. She has been the leader of the company since 1999.

== Education ==
Goodman was awarded a Bachelor of Arts degree from the University of Pennsylvania and a Master of Business Administration degree from Tuck School of Business at Dartmouth College.

== Career ==
Goodman was Vice President of Commerce Products Group at Open Market, Inc., Vice President of Marketing at Progress Software Corp., Director of Product Management at Dun & Bradstreet Software, and a Manager at Bain & Co., Inc.

She has been with Constant Contact from its early days. Since then the company has grown to have more than 1,100 employees in seven office locations. It has also gone through a successful IPO. The company has more than half a million small business customers. She left the company shortly after its sale to Endurance International Group Holdings in 2015.

She is a trustee of the Massachusetts Technology Leadership Council, and a member of the board of directors of the SCORE Association, a non-profit serving small businesses. She has served on the boards of MassChallenge and Entrepreneurship for All.

In November 2016, Goodman became a member of the board of directors of Shopify, an e-commerce company.

In May 2019, Goodman became co-founder and chief product officer of software startup Pepperlane. Until January 2023, Pepperlane provided tools and support for women to start and manage microbusinesses part time.

== Works ==
- Goodman, Gail F. Engagement Marketing: How Small Business Wins in a Socially Connected World (2012) 224pp ISBN 978-1118101025
