= Anthea Kreston =

Violinist and author

- Born: Chicago Illinois U.S.
- Genre: Classical music
- Occupations: Violinist, chamber musician, educator and author
- Instrument: Violin
- Years active: 1990s - present
- Member of: Delgani String Quartet, Trio Libermé, Amelia Piano Trio, Thunder Egg Consort
- Formerly of: Artemis Quartet, Avalon String Quartet
- Website: antheakreston.com

Anthea Kreston is an American violinist, chamber musician, educator, and author. She serves as first violinist of the Delgani String Quartet and the Thunder Egg Consort. She was a member of Germany's Artemis Quartet and has performed on major international stages including Carnegie Hall, Wigmore Hall, and the Concertgebouw. Kreston is the founder and executive director of Inside Music Academy, an international music school. She is the 2026-27 Artist in Residence at All Classical Radio, and the author of the upcoming memoir, Crescendo: Chronicles of an Adventurous Violinist to be published by Paul Dry Books in October 2026.

== Early life and education ==
Kreston was born and raised in Chicago, Illinois. She began playing the violin at age two. She studied at the Curtis Institute of Music in Philadelphia where she was a classmate of violinist, Hilary Hahn. She earned a performance degree from Curtis and a B.A. in Women's Studies from Cleveland State University. She later completed a Master of Music at the Hartt School at the University of Hartford in 2001. Her teachers and mentors include Ida Kavafian, Felix Galimir, Shmuel Ashkenasi, the Emerson String Quartet, and Isaac Stern.

== Career ==
Kreston was a founding member of the Avalon String Quartet formed in 1995 with whom she won the top prize at the ARD International Music Competition in 2000. She was a member of the quartet for seven years. In 1999 she co-founded the Amelia Piano Trio.

She participated in Yo-Yo Ma’s Silk Road Project touring internationally including to Central Asia. She performed as concertmaster of the Deutsche Oper Berlin and appeared as substitute with the Berlin Philharmonic. She also served as principal violin with other ensembles including guest appearances with the Saint Paul Chamber Orchestra.

In 2016 Kreston joined the Artemis Quartet as second violinist becoming the only American violinist in a major European string quartet following the death of violist, Friedemann Weigle. Her violin was stolen while traveling with the quartet in 2016. She remained until 2019. With the quartet she recorded Dmitri Shostakovich's string quartets and piano quintet with pianist, Elisabeth Leonskaja, for Warner Classics. The release won Germany's ECHO Klassik and France's Diapason d'Or.

Since 2021 she has been first violinist of the Delgani String Quartet based in Oregon and described by Oregon Arts Watch as the state's finest chamber ensemble. She also performs with her piano trio, Trio Libermé, and ensembles Amelia Piano Trio, and the Thunder Egg Consort. Kreston has served on juries for numerous competitions including the Fischoff National Chamber Music Competition, Premio Borciani International String Quartet Competition, and ARD International Competition.

=== Teaching ===
Kreston was Professor of chamber music at the Berlin University of the Arts, and Master Teacher at the Queen Elisabeth Music Chapel in Brussels. She has taught at the Curtis Institute of Music Summerfest and the school of music and dance at the University of Oregon. Kreston is founder and executive director of Inside Music Academy. During the COVID-19 pandemic she gained attention for virtual teaching, prompting a featured story in The New York Times.

== Writing and media ==
Kreston wrote a popular weekly classical music blog and diary for Norman Lebrecht’s Slipped Disc site, one of the top five most-read music blogs internationally. She has contributed articles to Strings Magazine and Chamber Music Magazine. She founded and curates the Fortnightly Music Book Club later associated with her academy, and has hosted podcasts from Berlin’s Pierre Boulez Saal. Kreston is the 2026-27 Artist in Residence for All Classical Radio with a blog, Chronicles of an Adventurous Violinist.

Her debut memoir, Crescendo: Chronicles of an Adventurous Violinist is scheduled for publication by Paul Dry Books in October 2026. She has created, toured, and performed a one-woman show based on the book. Kreston will be a featured author at the Portland Book Festival in November 2026.

== Personal life ==
Kreston lives in Corvallis, Oregon with her husband cellist, Jason Duckles, and their two daughters. She is known for her interests in growing tomatoes and keeping guinea pigs.

== Awards and recognition ==
- ARD International Music Competition (with Avalon Quartet)
- Grand Prize at the Fischoff National Chamber Music Competition (with Avalon Quartet)
- Concert Artists Guild Competition (with Avalon Quartet)
- Laureate status at the Banff International String Quartet Competition (with Avalon Quartet)
- Laureate status at the Melbourne International String Quartet Competition (with Avalon Quartet)
- ECHO Klassik and Diapason d’Or (with Artemis Quartet Warner Classics recording)
- Chamber Music America awards for community outreach work with abused children and AIDS patients in Hartford Connecticut
- Solo debut at the Kennedy Center Washington D.C.

The San Diego Reader described her as a soloist of the Heifetz-Shaham-Vengerov caliber.

== Discography (selected) ==
Year	Title	Details
2019	Shostakovich: String Quartets and Piano Quintet	Artemis Quartet with Elisabeth Leonskaja Warner Classics
2001	Ravel and Janáček: Dawn to Dusk	Avalon String Quartet, Channel Classics
2022	Elena Ruehr: Icarus and Other Music	Delgani String Quartet, AVIE Records
2023	Soul of Brazil	Delgani String Quartet with Clarice Assad, AVIE Records
