= Lindsey County Council =

County Council area in Lincolnshire, England

History
- Founded: 1 April 1889
- Disbanded: 1 April 1974
- Succeeded by: Lincolnshire County Council

Meeting place
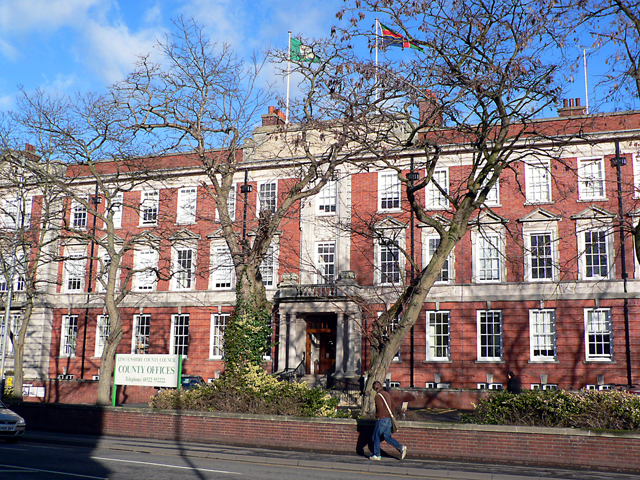
- County Offices, Lincoln

Lindsey County Council was the county council of Lindsey, one of the three Parts of Lincolnshire in eastern England. It came into its powers on 1 April 1889 and was abolished on 1 April 1974. The county council was initially based at the County Hall, Lincoln Castle and then, from 1932, based at the County Offices in Lincoln. It was abolished in 1974 and the bulk of its territory amalgamated with Holland County Council and Kesteven County Council to form the new Lincolnshire County Council, while the northern part was combined with portions of the East Riding of Yorkshire and West Riding of Yorkshire to form Humberside.
