= Scorer and Gamble =

British architectural practice

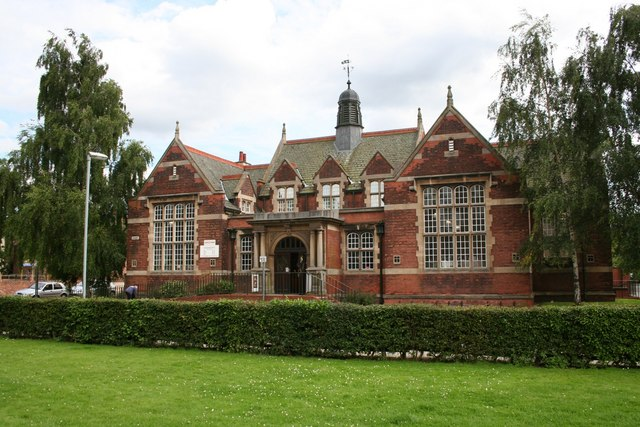
- Gainsborough Public Library 1905

Practice information
- Partners: William Scorer and Henry Gilbert Gamble
- Founded: 1901
- Dissolved: 1934
- Location: Lincoln

Significant works and honors
- Buildings: Lincolnshire County Council Offices, Lincoln.

Scorer and Gamble was an architectural practice in Lincoln which operated between 1901 and 1913, although the name Scorer and Gamble continued to be used until 1930. The partnership was between William Scorer (1843–1934) and Henry Gilbert Gamble (1867–1944). The partnership operated from Bank Street Chambers Lincoln. Their work is described as "eclectic, ranging from the Arts and Crafts/Art Nouveau of Gainsborough Library (1905) to the more disciplined English Renaissance of Horncastle (1908) and later schools". In 1903, Gamble, who may have been the more talented designer was appointed architect to the Lindsey County Council Education Committee.

== The partners ==
=== William Scorer (1843 or 1844–1934) ===
Student at Lincoln School of Art. Articled to Henry Francis Goddard of Lincoln and later worked for Henry Sumners of Liverpool. Practised in London for two years. ARIBA in 1881. From about 1881 and 1883 he was in partnership with William Watkins, when he was working from St Edmond's Chambers, Lincoln. In partnership with W. Watt for three years and in partnership with Gamble from 1901. He was a Lincoln Diocesan Surveyor.

==== Work by William Scorer ====
- Bernadette House, Formerly St Botolph's Vicarage, South Park, Lincoln. 1877. This was designed when Scorer was practising in London.
- Lincoln Public Dispensary, Silver Street, Lincoln. with William Watkins, 1878. Impressive building in Queen Anne Style probably brick with red terracotta decoration. Advanced wing with three bays to right. First and second storeys of wing with canted bays, surmounted with a decorative pediment. This building appears to have been demolished before 1964.
- 102 High Street, Lincoln. (1887) Shop with living accommodation on three storeys and basement with earlier rear house, a substantial rebuild in 1887, of an earlier property. Arts and Crafts with tile hanging to third storey gable with oculus window.
- Former HSBC Bank, 25 High Street, Horncastle.(1894). Facing the Market Place. Built for the Lindsey and Lincoln Bank.
- 5-6 Bank Street, Lincoln. Offices for Page and Porter, Solicitors. 1898. Tudor Revival. Two storeys with two bays with three lights and additional light over decorative doorway. Brick with ashlar stringing, base coursing and dressing. Arched doorway with Tudoresque foliage and grinning faces on at ends of stringcourse above.

=== Henry Gilbert Gamble (1867–1944) ===
Educated at Queen Elizabeth Grammar School, Gainsborough. Articled to Demaine and Brierley in York and transferred to William Watkins of Lincoln 1886–88. Worked for Ewan Christian in London. ARIBA in 1891 and started to practice in Lincoln in 1897 before entering into a partnership with William Scorer. Later in partnership with Philip Walter Birkett and Neville Barker. Appointed surveyor to the Lincoln County Committee. He appears to have ceased practising as an architect in 1936 and he died on 28 October 1944.

==== Work by H.G. Gamble, prior to partnership ====
- 115 High Street, Lincoln.Corner of High St. with Gaunt St. 4 houses and shops. Eight bay block (at first floor level). Divided into four shops. Brick with limestone stringing . 4 pedimented gables and one gable to Gaunt Street. Cupola at corner.

== Work by Scorer and Gamble ==
=== Public buildings ===
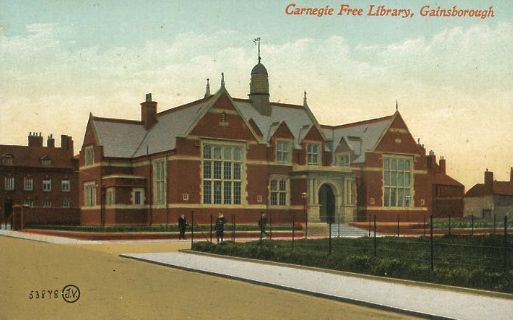
Gainsborough Library 1905

- Boston Drill Hall
- Gainsborough Public Library. Cobden Street. 1905. Carnegie Library. Brick with stone dressings. Tudoresque with symmetrical front, projecting wings with large mullioned transomed windows. Central classical porch with coupled columns with a lantern over.
- Gainsborough House, former Dispensary, Gladstone Street, Gainsborough. 1905.
- Gainsborough Snooker Club. Brick with stone dressings.
- Spalding Drill Hall, Haverfield Road, Spalding. 1913.
- Nurses Homes, Lincoln County Hospital, Lincoln 1914.

==== Lincolnshire County Offices ====
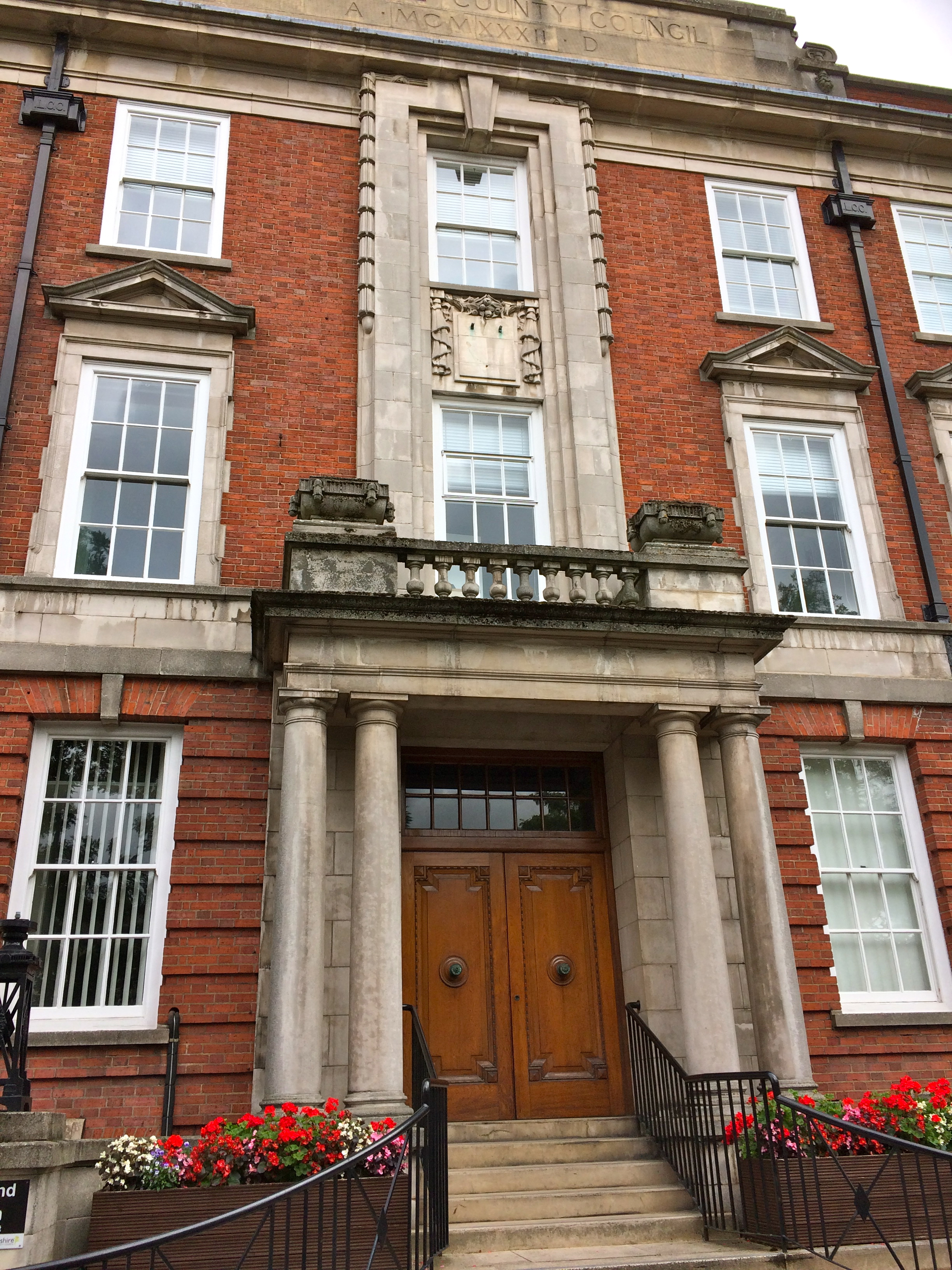
Lincolnshire County Offices, Entrance portico

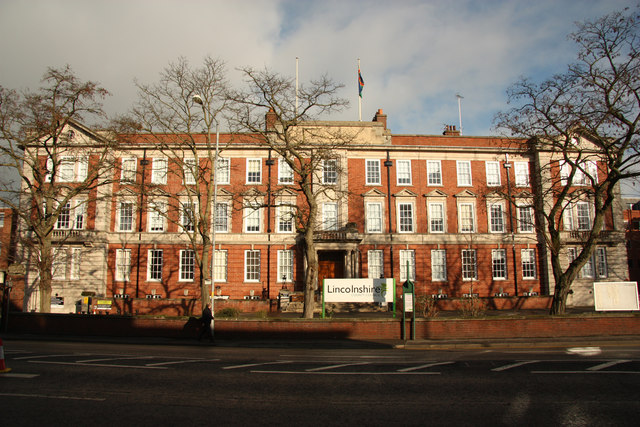
Lincolnshire County Council Offices 1926-32

- Lincolnshire County Council Offices 1926–1933. (formerly Lindsey County Offices until 1974). Newland, Lincoln. 1926–1932. By the Lincoln architects Scorer and Gamble. Lincolnshire County Council Offices (formerly Lindsey County Offices - H.G. Gamble was theLindsey County Surveyor). Newland, Lincoln. The Lindsey County Council acquired Newland House (Listed Grade II), which stood in a small area of parkland, in about 1922. The new offices were then laid out around two quadrangles with the main facade facing onto Newland. Newland house, by the Lincoln architect William Hayward dating from 1824, was incorporated into the upper quadrangle on the West Parade frontage. Scorer and Gamble made three applications for building approval to the Lincoln City Council. Building commenced on the Upper Quadrangle and the second phase was the southern facade and quadrangle which was in a Neo-Georgian style with brick and innovative concrete dressings. Rusticated ground floor with porch with coupled Ionic columns and balustraded parapet. The second floor has pedimented windows. The third phase returned to the upper quadrangle, and an Art Deco staircase was inserted into Newland House and the entrance, showing Art Deco influence, was added to the West Parade frontage and to the gate columns on both entrances.

=== Schools ===
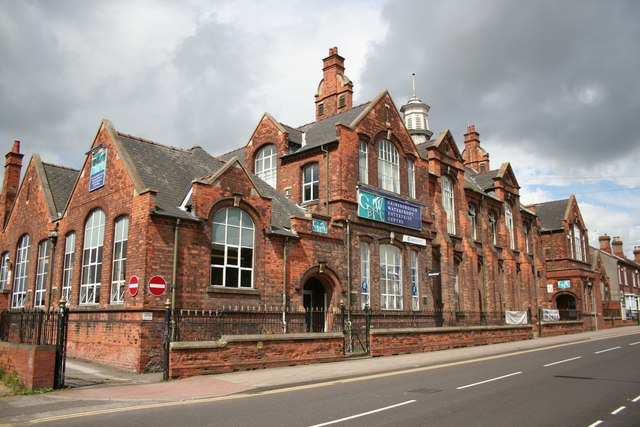
Lea Road, Primary Road, Gainsborough, 1911.

- Cleethorpe Secondary School. 1925. Former Lower School.
- County Infants School, Lea Road, Gainsborough, 1911, now West Lindsey Enterprise Centre. Reminiscent of a London Board School. Symmetrical facade, heavily buttressed. with an octagonal bellcote above.
- Holton le Moor School, Lincolnshire by Gamble, 1923.
- Horncastle, Queen Elizabeth Grammar School. 1908. Single-storied in brick. Queen Anne style
- Monks Dyke High School, Louth. 1929.
- High Ridge Comprehensive School, Scunthorpe. By Gamble 1926–27,

=== Church restoration work ===
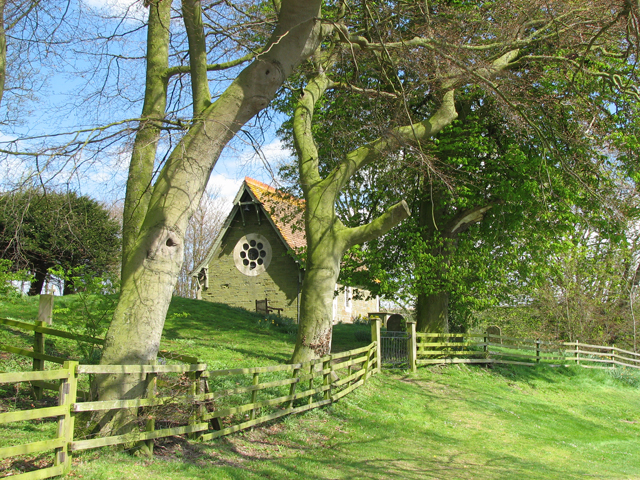
Saint Olave's Church, Ruckland, 1885

- Baumber, Lincolnshire.
- Doddington, Lincolnshire.
- Long Bennington, Lincolnshire. 1902–03.
- Ruckland, Lincolnshire. New Church by W. Scorer, 1885. Lincolnshire's smallest church has a rose window at the west end with a bellcote cantilevered out from the gable.
- Withern, Lincolnshire Bellcote and porch by W. Scorer, 1894.

=== Shops and offices ===
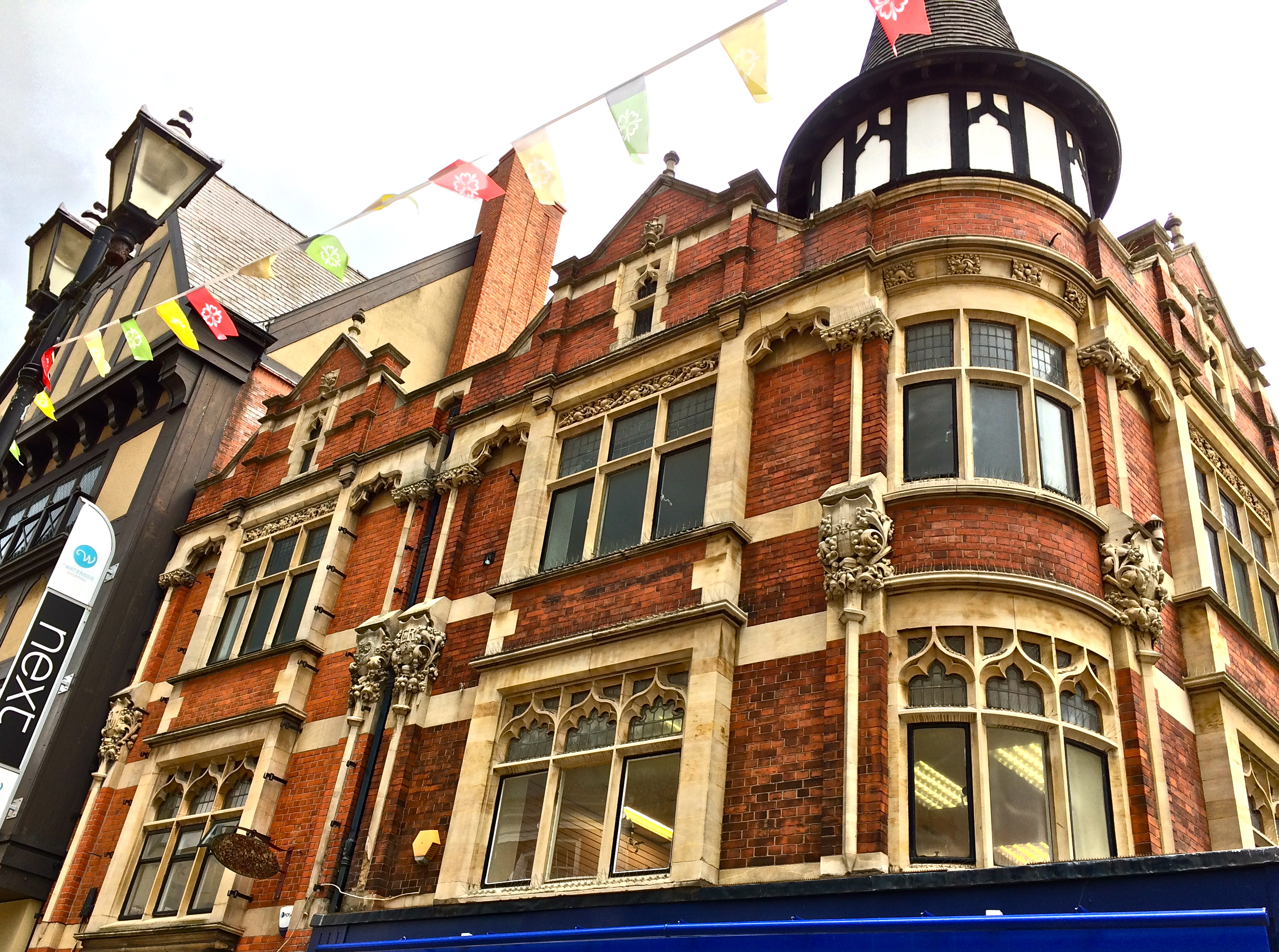
302 High Street Lincoln is now Carphone Warehouse, 1907

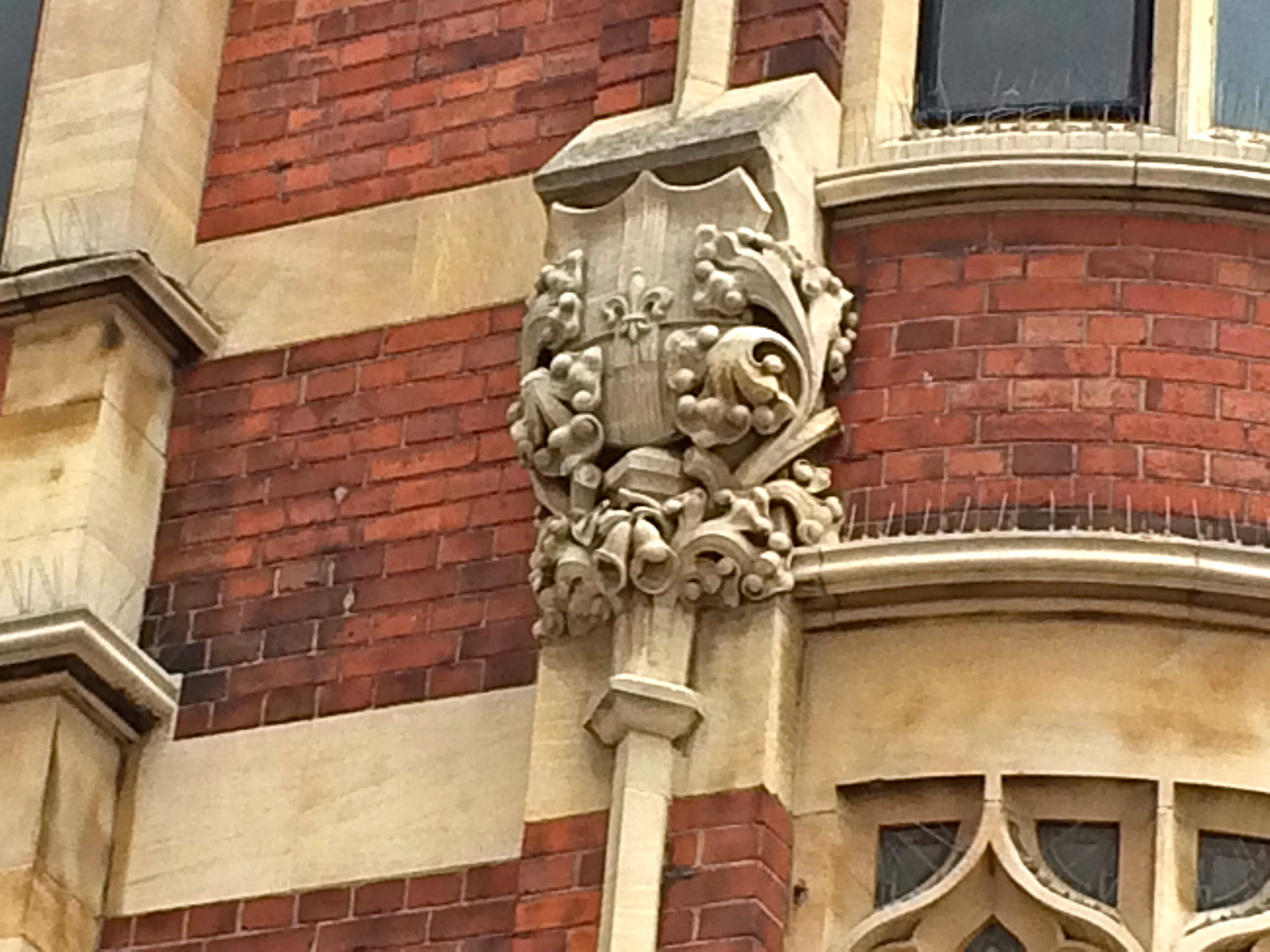
302 High Street Lincoln, carved stone detail with Lincoln Fleur-de-lys

- 302 High Street, Lincoln by Scorer and Gamble, 1907. In a late Tudor Gothic style with ornate carved decoration. The south side overlooks the River Witham and has been badly disfigured by later additions which were since removed, but have scarred the building. It was originally built for a Mr J. Cooper and the southern portion was occupied by Lipton Teas. It is now occupied by Carphone Warehouse, with an unsympathetic fascia added at first-floor level.

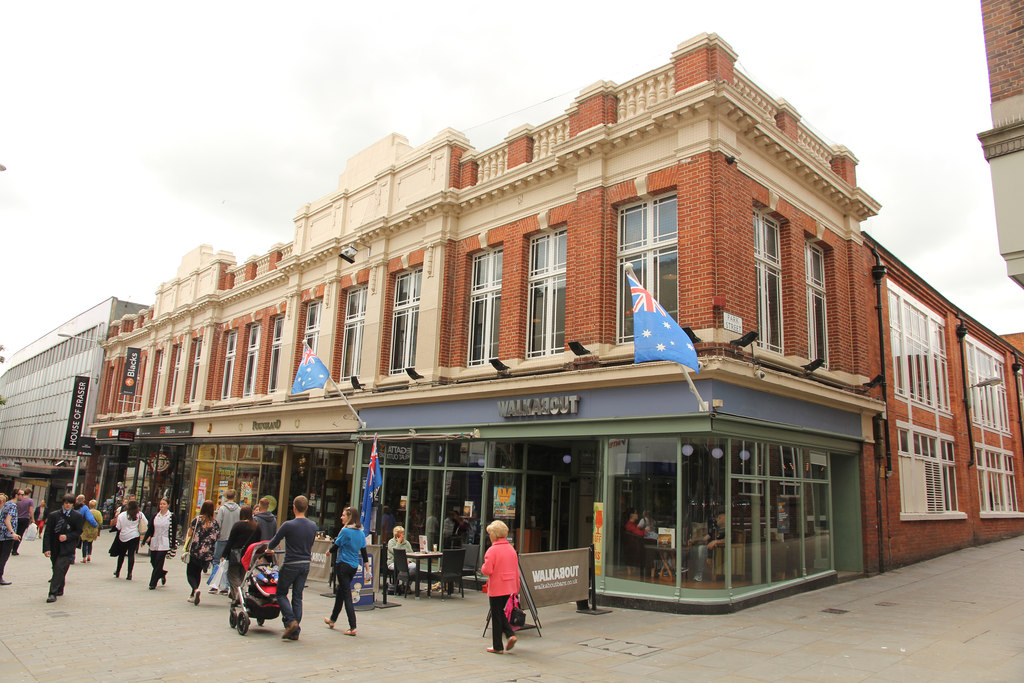
Former Bainbridges Store, 233–237 High Street, 1925

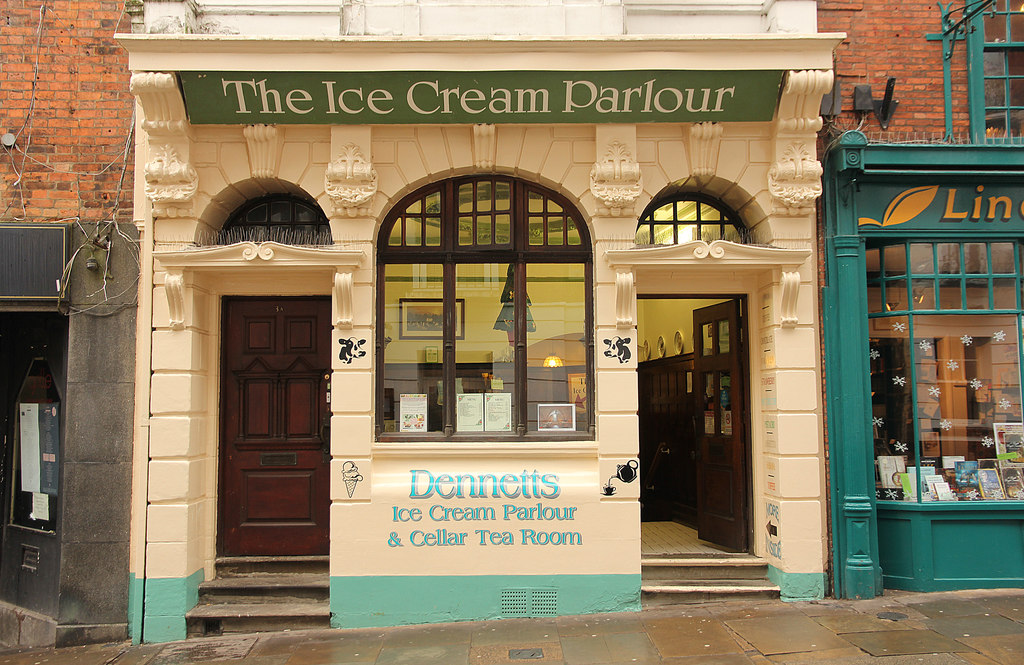
Dennetts Ice Cream Parlour. Refronted 1913.

- 3 Bailgate, Lincoln. (1913) Re-fronting in a Baroque revival-style for the London and Midland Bank. It is now Dennett's Ice Cream Parlour. The basement has a 13th-century quadripartite vault and some other medieval masonry.
- Bainbridges Store, 233–237 High Street, Lincoln. 1925. Bainbridges was established in 1846 and at that time occupied 234 High Street, a fine later 18th-century building with a classical doorway and bow-windows. The store expanded into properties on either side. In 1925, the whole group of buildings was demolished, but Scorer and Gamble, who appear to have been the architects, applied to the City Council to move the classical doorway to the Park Street frontage, where it still remains.

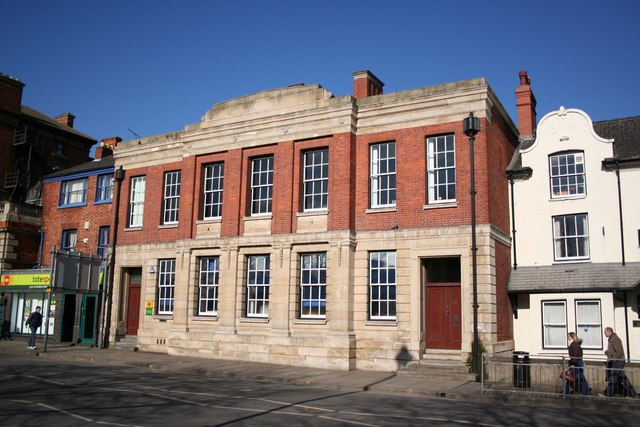
Former NFU Offices.

- North Central House, 12-14 St Mary's Street, Lincoln. Built as new offices for the Lincoln Wagon Co. in 1925 who had a fleet of railway wagons rented to local companies. Former NFU Offices. A stylish example of an early Neo-Georgian office block. Seven bays with three advanced central bays. The ground floor is faced in ashlared limestone with pendant ornamentation to the sides of the sides of the sash windows. The first floor is brick and this is capped with a limestone balustrade and a pediment over the central bays.

=== Houses ===
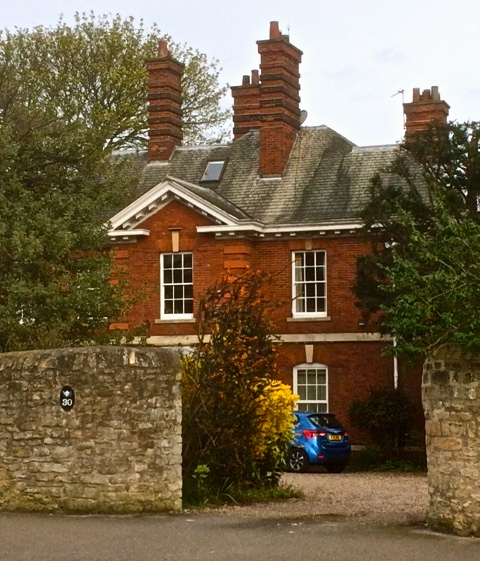
30 Nettleham Road Lincoln

- 30 Nettleham Road. A 'villa' built for a Mr Bennett in 1908 in Queen Anne style with brick rustication and raised brickwork on the chimney stacks.

=== Carholme Road, Lincoln ===
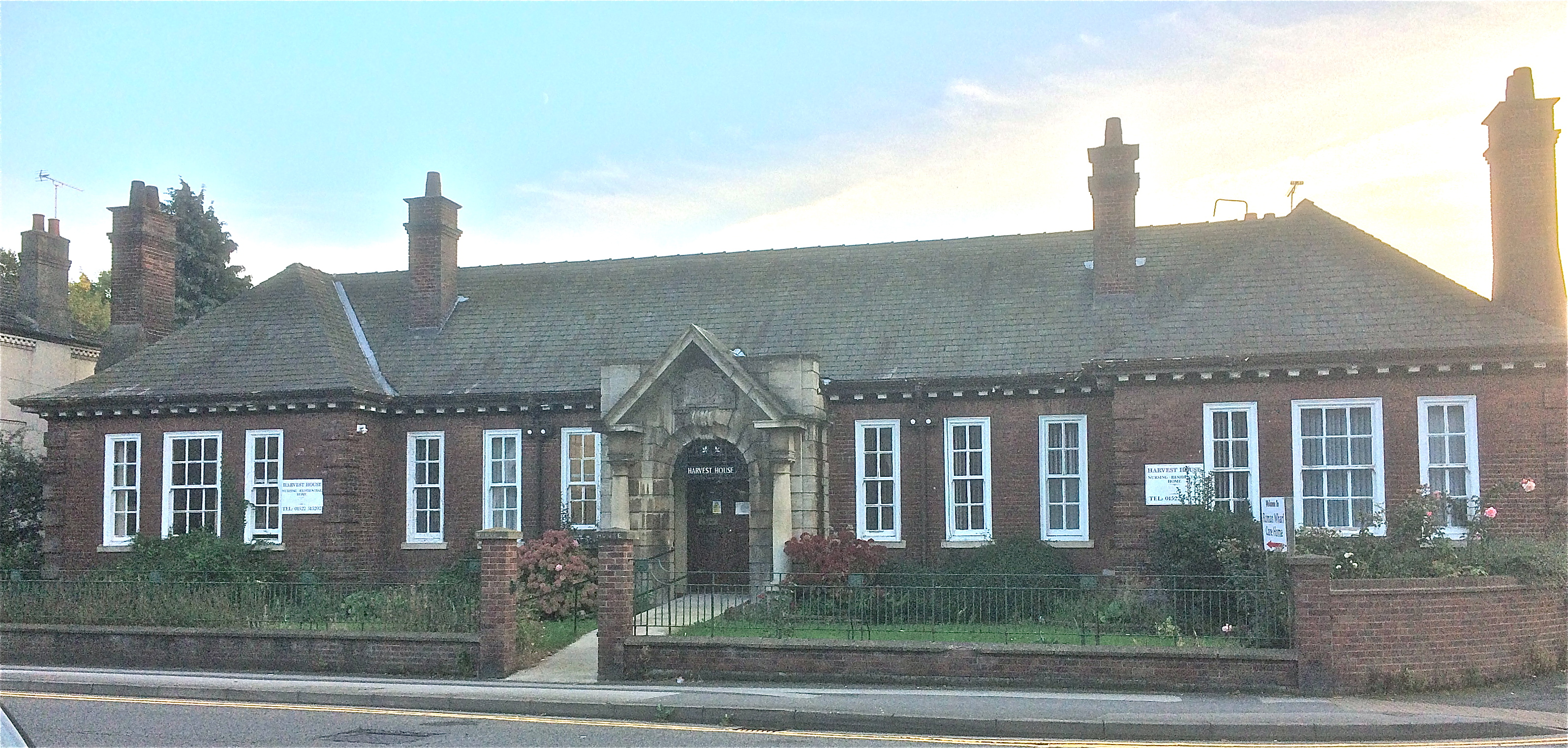
Harvest House, Carholme Road, Lincoln 1919

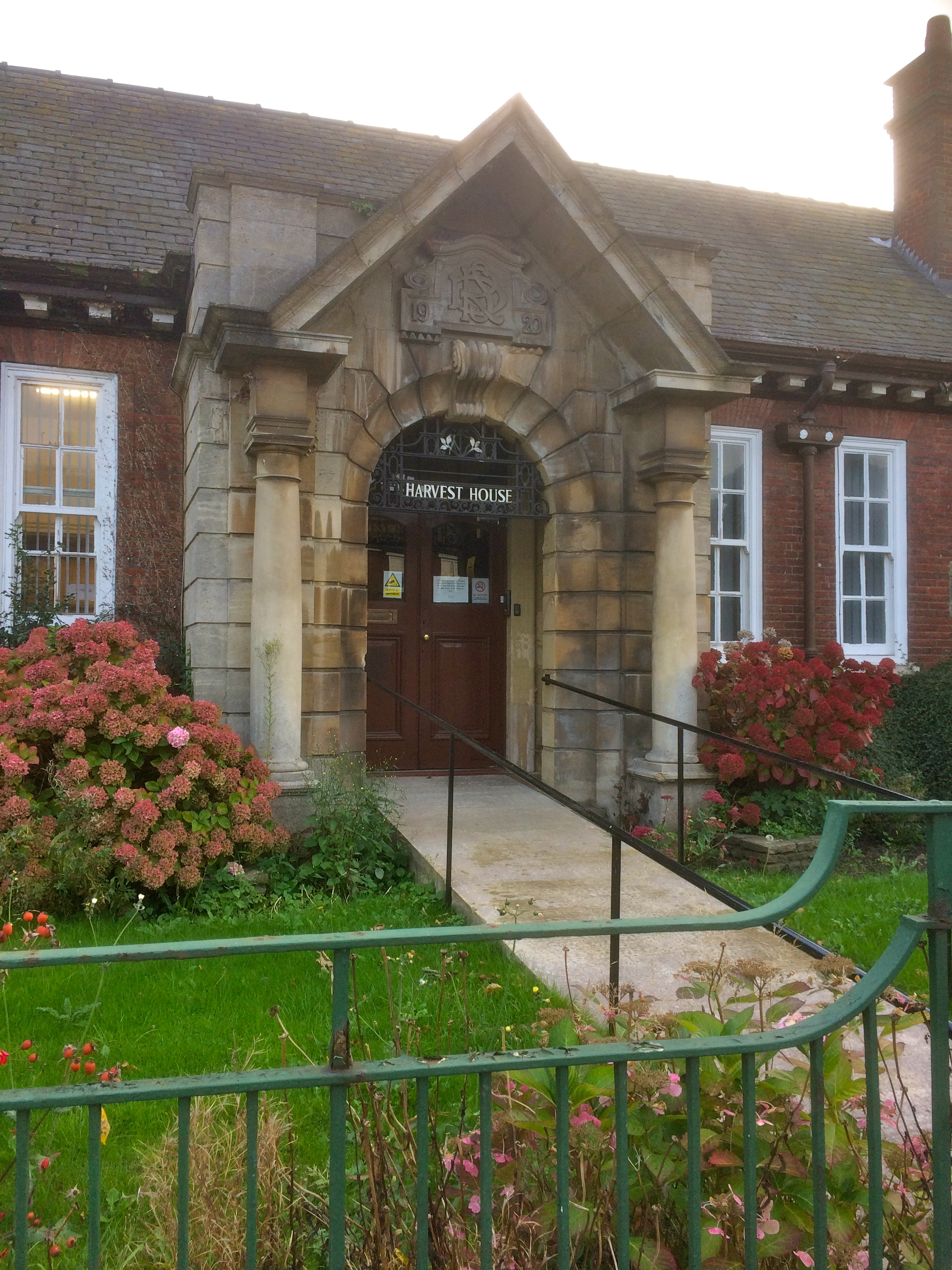
Porch, Harvest House, Carholme Road, Lincoln

In 1919 a large area of land became available at the west end of Carholme Road before the Lincoln racecourse. The area, which was used for industrial purposes, was bounded on the south by the Foss Dyke. Part was taken up by Doughty, Son and Richardson, manufacturers of cattle cake and the remainder by Newsum and Son's joinery works. Remaining buildings designed by Scorer and Gamble are Harvester House, which housed offices for Doughty, Son and Richardson and Newsum Villas, probably worker's housing for Newsum and Son.

== Literature ==
- Antram, N. (revised); Pevsner, N. & Harris, J., (1989), The Buildings of England: Lincolnshire, Penguin Books; reissued by Yale University Press.
- Brodie. A. (ed.) (2001), Directory of British Architects, 1834–1914: 2 vols. British Architectural Library, Royal Institute of British Architects.
