= County Offices, Lincoln =

County building in Lincoln, Lincolnshire, England

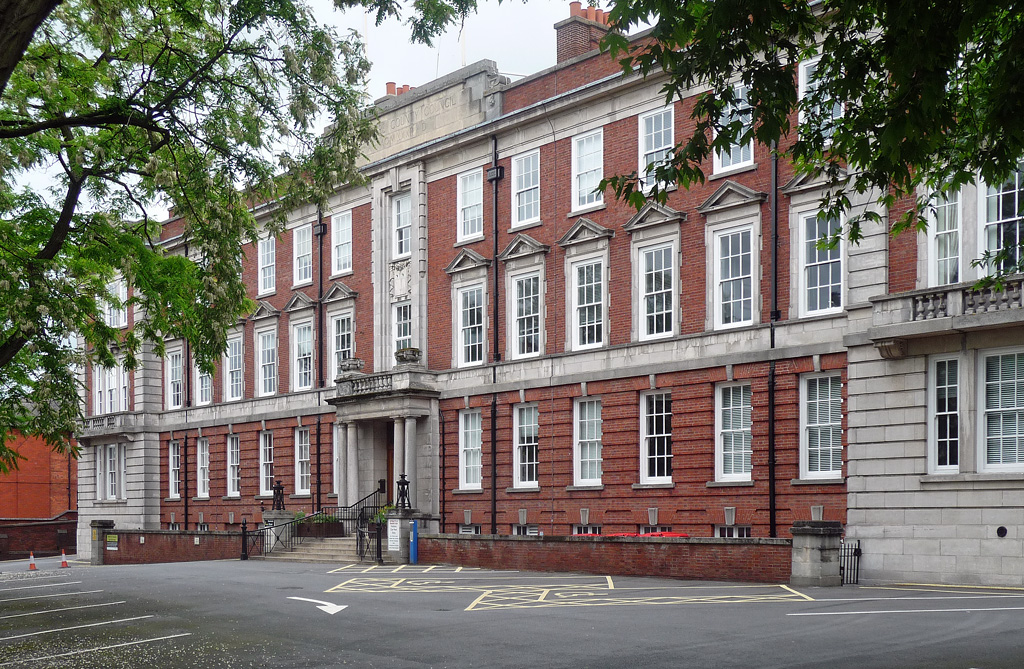
- County Offices

- Location within Lincolnshire

General information
- Architectural style: Neo-Georgian style
- Location: Lincoln, Lincolnshire, United Kingdom
- Coordinates: 53.2313°N 0.5457°W
- Completed: 1932

Design and construction
- Architect: Scorer and Gamble

The County Offices is a municipal building in Newland, Lincoln in the county of Lincolnshire in England. It is the headquarters of Lincolnshire County Council.

== History ==
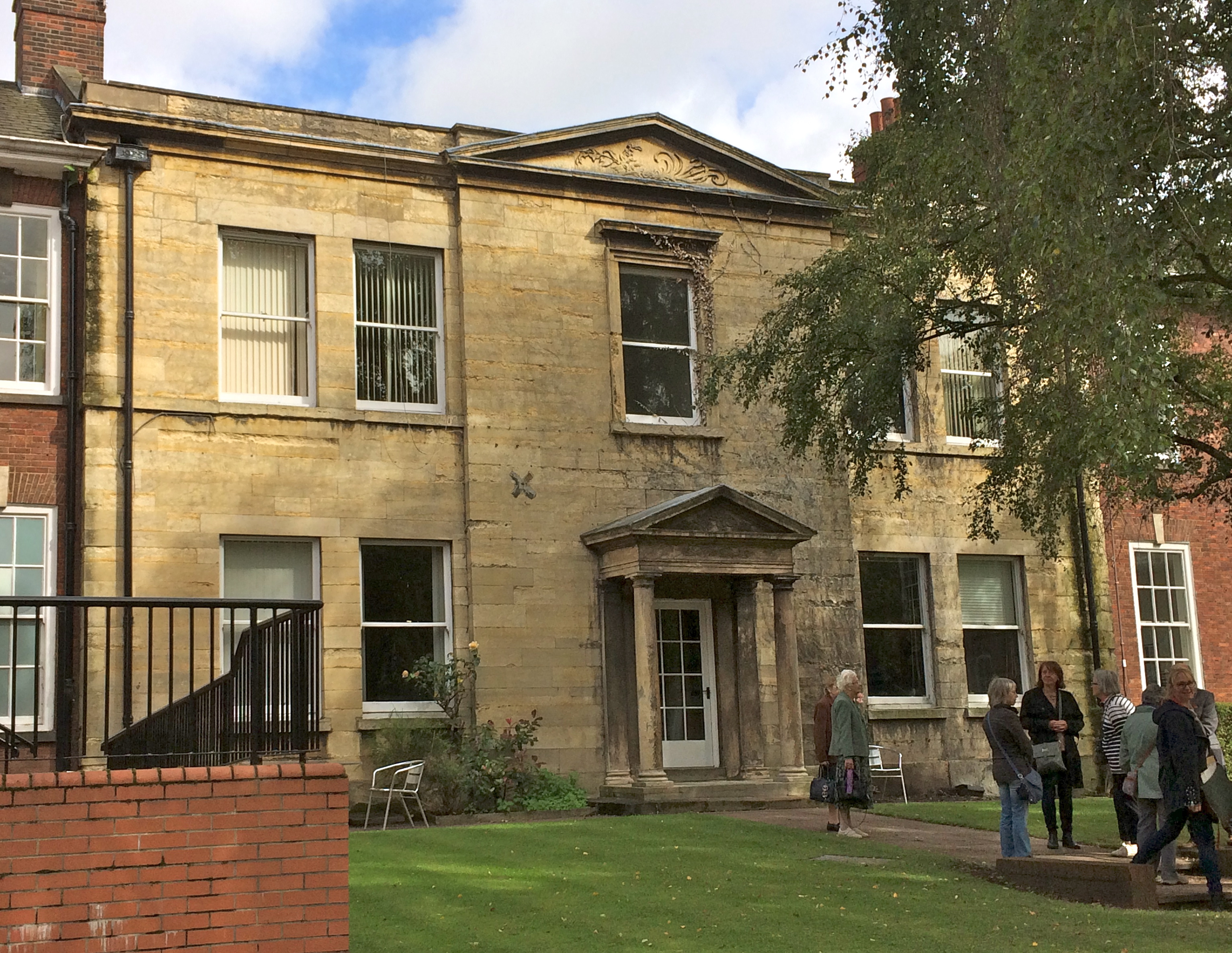
The frontage of Newland House, a Grade II listed building, which forms part of the northern elevation of the northern quadrangle

In the late 19th century and early 20th century meetings of Lindsey County Council were held at County Hall, Lincoln Castle. After deciding the old county hall was inadequate for their needs, county leaders chose to procure a new county headquarters: the site selected they selected was the substantial grounds of a house known as Newland House which had been designed by William Hayward in the classical style and completed in 1824. Council officials purchased the estate from the executors of the local coal merchant, William John Warrener. (Note: Warrener's son was the artist, William T. Warrener, best known for being the subject of his friend Henri de Toulouse-Lautrec's painting L'Anglais au Moulin Rouge (The Englishman at the Moulin Rouge) (1892).)

Construction started with the demolition of everything except the original facade of Newland House in 1926. The new building was designed by Scorer and Gamble in a Neo-Georgian style and was officially opened by the chairman of the county council, George Edward Heneage, 2nd Baron Heneage, in 1932.

The new structure was built around two quadrangles. The first phase was the northern facade and quadrangle (which incorporated the original facade of Newland House) (Note: The design of Newland House involved a symmetrical main frontage of five bays facing south; the central bay, which slightly projected forwards, featured a porch with Doric order columns, a sash window on the first floor and a pediment at roof level. In the mid-1970s the chief executive of the county council sat in the large room behind the facade, but it was subsequently occupied by the legal department.) and the second phase was the southern facade and quadrangle which was built with red brick and innovative concrete dressings. The third phase involved inserting an Art Deco staircase into Newland House.

The design for the main building involved a symmetrical main frontage with fifteen bays facing onto Newland with the end bays slighted projected forwards; the central section featured a portico with paired Doric Order columns and balustraded parapet; there were sash windows on the first and second floors with a stone surround which extended to both floors. Internally, the principal room was the council chamber. Pevsner described the building as "all somewhat dry and academic".

Following the implementation of the Local Government Act 1972, the building became the headquarters of the newly created Lincolnshire County Council in 1974.
