= AQH share =

AQH share is a statistic that measures broadcast radio listenership.

== Definition ==
AQH is an abbreviation for average quarter-hour persons, defined by Arbitron (now referred to as Nielsen Audio) as the average number of persons listening to a particular station for at least five minutes during a 15-minute period. Share is the percentage of those listening to radio in an Arbitron "market" (typically a metropolitan area) who are listening to a particular radio station. Thus, AQH Share for a given station is mathematically expressed as: $\frac{\text{AQH persons listening to station}}{\text{AQH persons listening to all market radio stations}} \times 100\%$

== Usage ==
AQH Share is most often used in conjunction with TSL (Time Spent Listening) to measure listenership in a market. While AQH measures the average number of listeners to the station, TSL tracks the length of time listeners are tuned continuously to the station.
