= Lincoln Crown Court =

County building in Lincoln, England

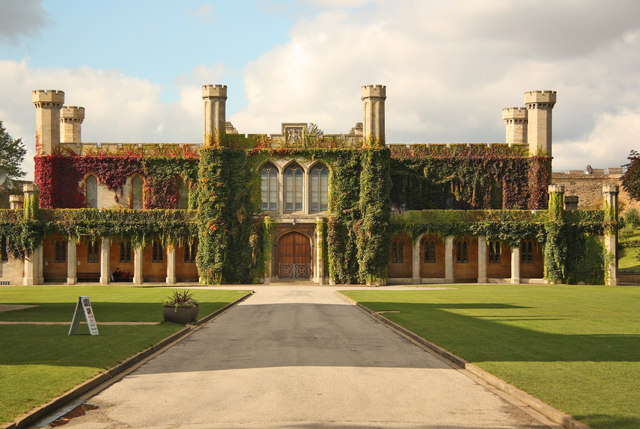

- Location within Lincolnshire
- 53.2351°N 0.5416°W
- Location: Lincoln, England

History
- Built: 1823

Site notes
- Architect: Sir Robert Smirke
- Architectural style: Gothic style

Listed Building – Grade II*
- Official name: Assize Courts
- Designated: 8 October 1953
- Reference no.: 1388488

Lincoln Crown Court is a judicial facility in Lincoln, England. It is located on the western side of the grounds of Lincoln Castle and is a Grade II* listed building.

== History ==
Court hearings have taken place within the grounds of Lincoln Castle since the castle was built in the 11th century. A medieval shirehall on the site was demolished and replaced by a new county hall in 1776. After finding that the 18th century county hall was subsiding due to a mixture of local quarrying and poor construction, the justices ordered its demolition using prison labour and the commissioning of a new facility on the same site.

The current building, which was designed by Sir Robert Smirke in the Gothic style and built at a cost of £40,000, was completed in 1823. The design involved a symmetrical main frontage with thirteen bays facing the east gate of the castle; the central section of three bays featured an arched doorway with a triple Gothic window on the first floor; the roof was crenellated and there were octagonal corner turrets. Internally, the principal rooms in the building were the two courtrooms, one for hearing criminal cases and the other for hearing civil cases, both approximately square, decorated with wainscot panelling and located on the first floor. There was also a grand jury room containing an ornate fireplace guarded by lions bearing shields.

In March 1872 the courthouse was the venue for the trial and conviction of William Frederick Horry, accused of murdering his wife: Horry became the first person to be executed in the UK using the "long drop" method of execution, a technique developed by William Marwood which was faster and therefore considered more humane than the previous method, and which was subsequently universally used.

The building continued to be used as a facility for dispensing justice but, following the implementation of the Local Government Act 1888, which established county councils in every county, it also became the meeting place of Lindsey County Council. After the county council moved to County Offices, Lincoln in 1932, the building was retained for the assize courts and, since 1972, for the Crown Court.

In the early 21st century Her Majesty's Courts Service announced proposals to move the Crown Court out of the castle grounds: this scheme was abandoned on the basis that it would not be value for money in November 2010. The idea of re-locating the Crown Court, possibly to the magistrates court building on the High Street, was briefly resurrected again but not progressed in March 2014.
