= Time spent listening =

Time spent listening (TSL) is one of the measurements surveyed by Nielsen Audio in determining ratings for radio stations in the United States. It is the equivalent of Average Time Exposed (ATE), Daily or Weekly.

TSL is defined as the amount of time the average listener surveyed spent listening to each radio station at one time, before changing the station or turning it off. Alternately, it is an estimate of how long the average panelist (listener) was exposed to a particular station or stations for a specific time period.

TSL trends are used in conjunction with AQH share ("AQH") to evaluate listenership to a station. In some radio formats, a station with low AQH (number of listeners) but high TSL is considered more attractive to advertisers than a high AQH / low TSL station, because the station's listeners are more likely to stick with the station through commercial breaks and hear the paid advertisements.
