= Abraham Hayward (architect) =

English architect (1692–1747)

Abraham Haywood
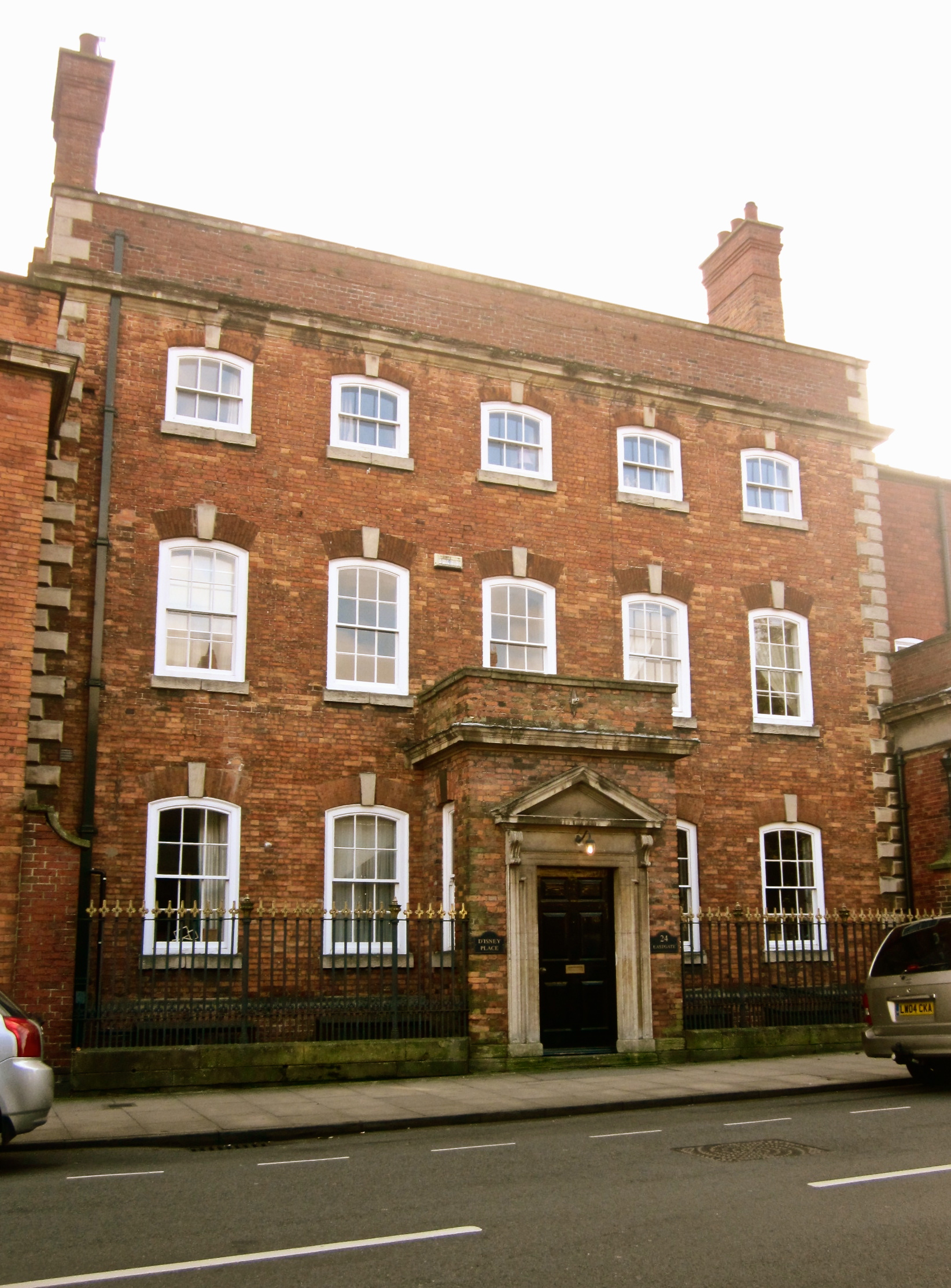
- D'isney Place in Eastgate St. Lincoln. By Abraham Hayward 1736
- Born: 1692; Whitchurch, Shropshire
- Died: 1747 (aged 54–55); Lincoln
- Education: Probably learnt his trade under Francis Smith of Warwick.
- Occupation: Architect
- Buildings: Disney Place Lincoln

Abraham Haywood (1692–1747) was an architect who was born at Whitchurch, Shropshire and is likely to have come to Lincoln around 1720 to work for Francis Smith of Warwick on the construction of St Peter at Arches Church, Lincoln. In 1736 he built the town house of the Disney family, Disney Place in Eastgate Street, Lincoln and in 1744 the Lincoln Assembly Rooms in the Bail, Lincoln. He also built a house for himself on the east side of St Peter at Arches‘ graveyard on the site of the Lincoln Taylor's Hall. Abraham Hayward's younger brother John Hayward (1708–78), a mason by trade, also accompanied him to Lincoln. After Abraham's death, he presumably continued the business and in 1753 rebuilt St Mary's bridge in Lincoln. John Hayward's grandson, William Hayward became surveyor to Lincoln Cathedral.

== Interior of the County Assembly Rooms, Bailgate by Hayward, 1744 ==
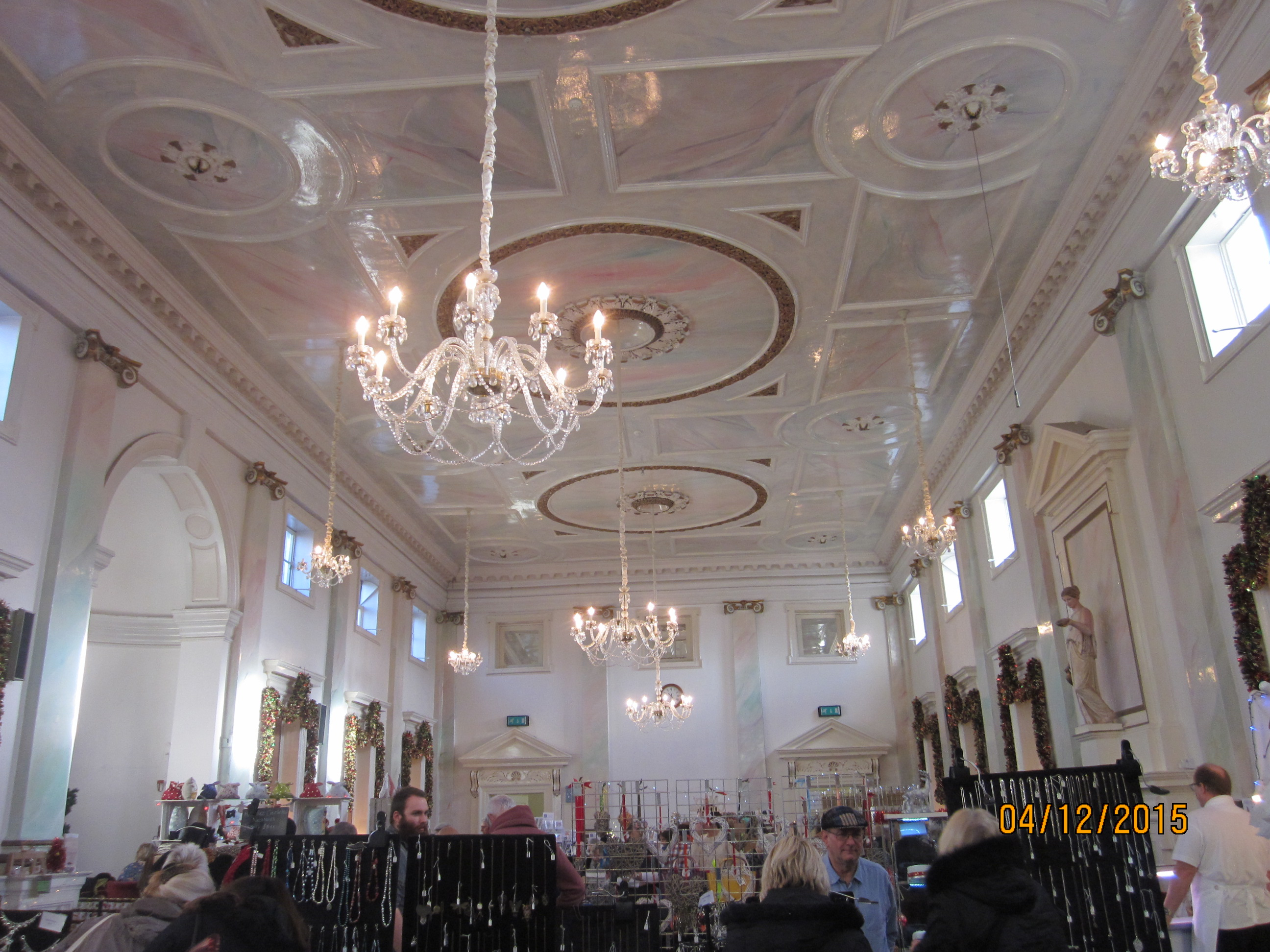
Interior of the Assembly Rooms, Bailgate, Lincoln

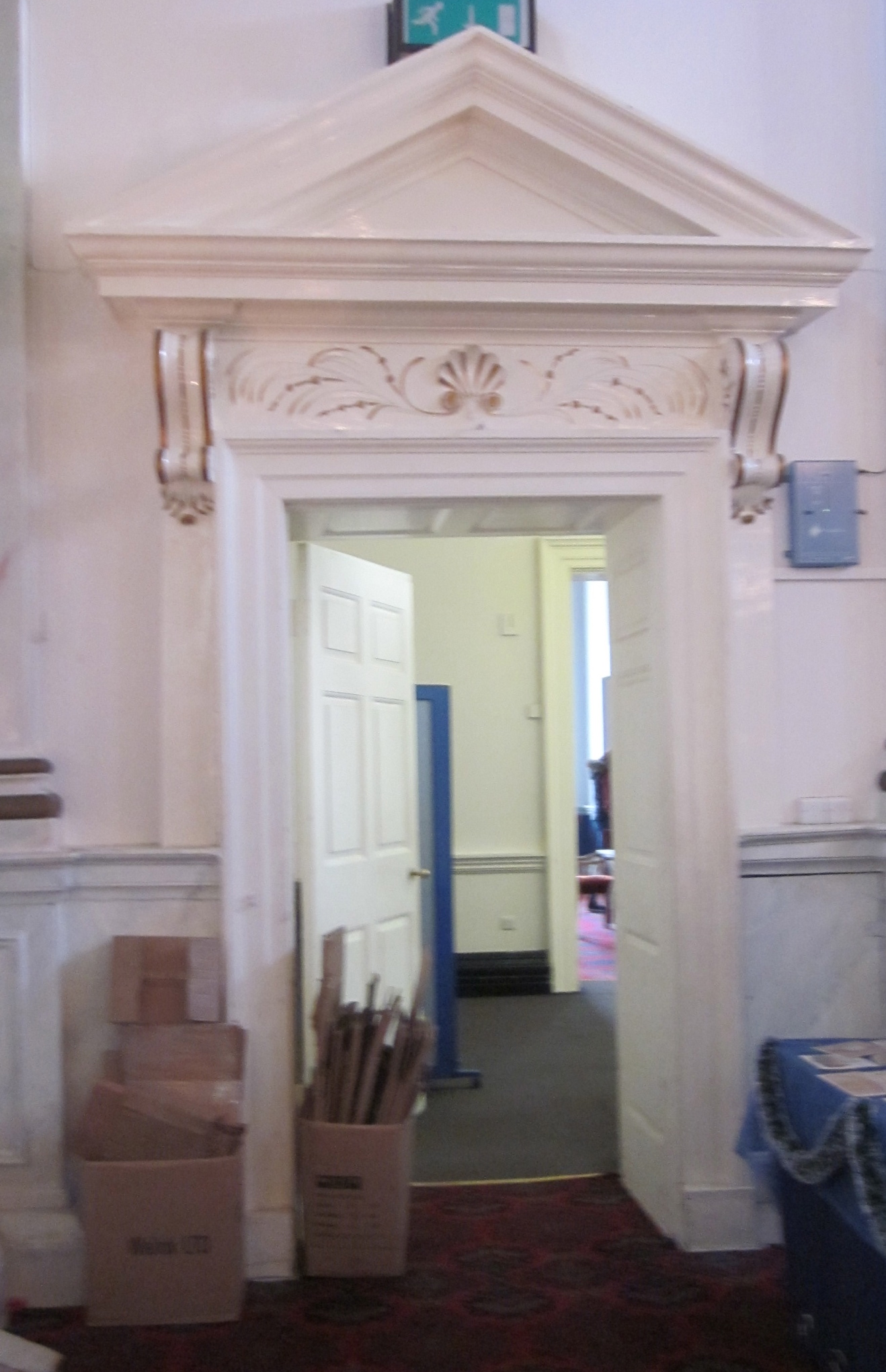
Interior of the Assembly Rooms, Bailgate, Lincoln. Classical doorway.

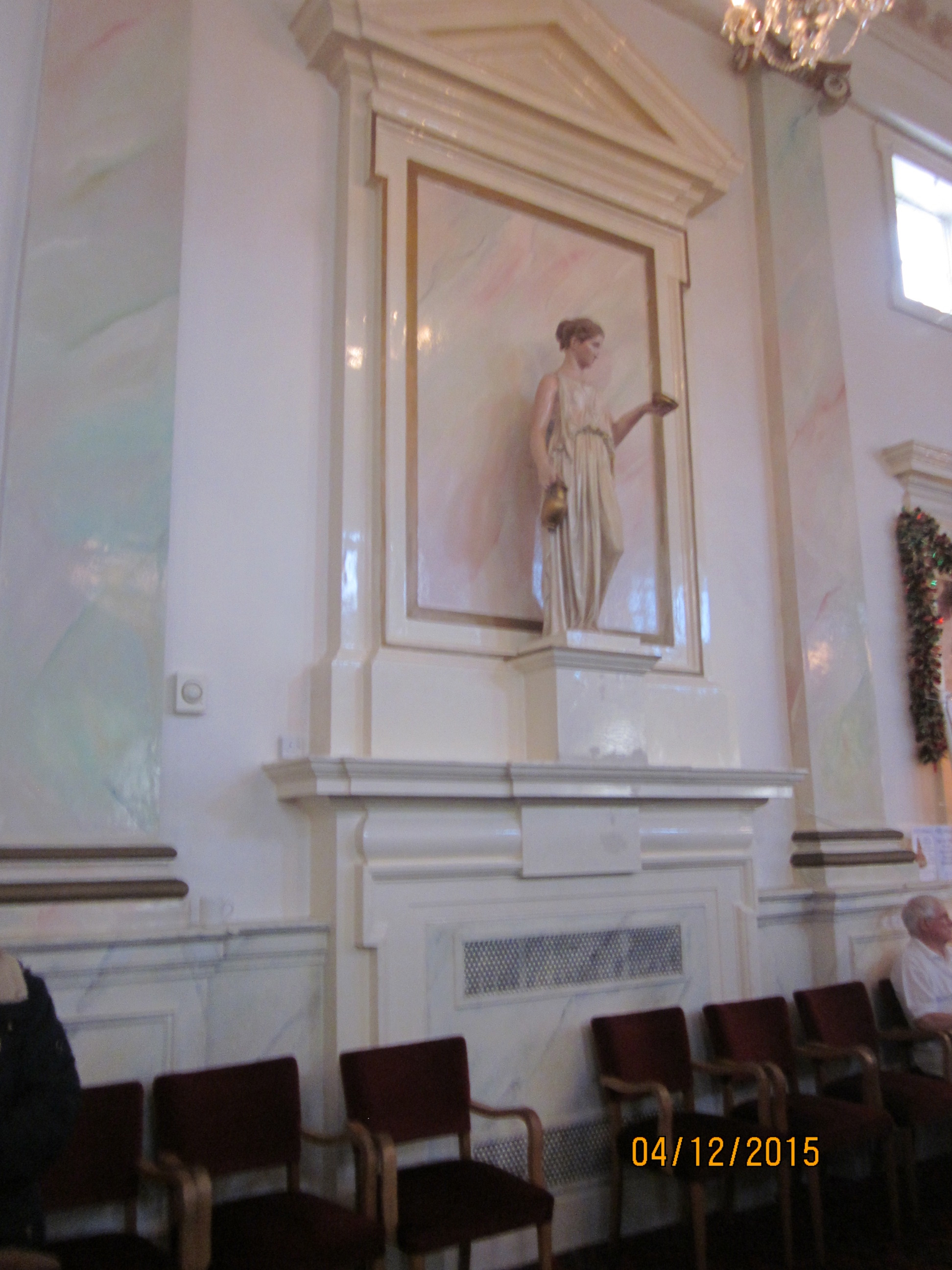
Interior of the Assembly Rooms, Bailgate, Lincoln

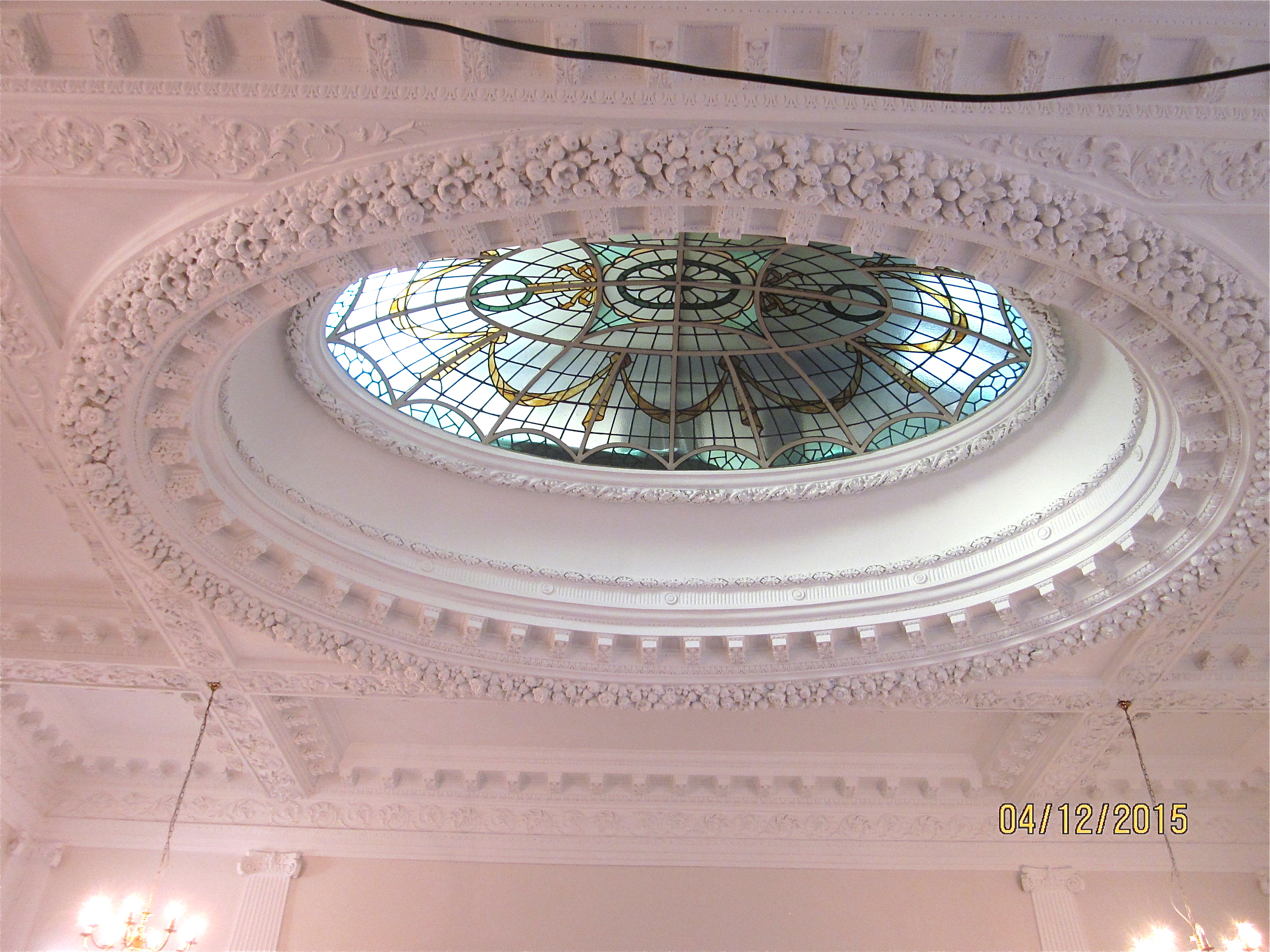
Assembly Rooms, Bailgate, Lincoln 1745 with Edwardian rooflight

== Literature ==
- Antram N (revised), Pevsner N & Harris J, (1989), The Buildings of England: Lincolnshire, Yale University Press.
- Colvin H. A (1995), Biographical Dictionary of British Architects 1600-1840. Yale University Press, 3rd edition London, pg.483.
