= Dance score =

Dance score may refer to:

- Dance notation that describes a dance
- Sheet music for a dance
- A performance score given by a judge at a dance competition
