= Nielsen Audio =

U.S. radio audience measurement since 1949

- Company type: Subsidiary
- Industry: Media market (research)
- Founded: 1949; 77 years ago, in Washington, D.C., U.S.
- Headquarters: Columbia, Maryland, U.S.
- Area served: United States
- Key people: Sean Creamer (CEO)
- Products: Ratings data
- Revenue: ▲US$422.31 million(FY 2010)
- Operating income: ▲US$85.11 million (FY 2010)
- Net income: ▲US$53.29 million (FY 2010)
- Total assets: ▲US$238.96 million (FY 2010)
- Total equity: ▲US$126.81 million (FY 2010)
- Owner: The Nielsen Company
- Number of employees: 1,625 (Dec 2011)
- Website: www.nielsen.com/audio

Nielsen Audio (formerly Arbitron) is a consumer research company in the United States that collects listener data on radio broadcasting audiences. It was founded as the American Research Bureau in Beltsville, Maryland, by Jim Seiler in 1949 and went national by merging with Los Angeles-based Coffin, Cooper, and Clay in the early 1950s. The company's first business was the collection of broadcast television ratings.

The company changed its name to Arbitron in the mid‑1960s, the namesake of the Arbitron System, a centralized statistical computer with leased lines to television viewers' homes to monitor their activity. Deployed in New York City, it gave live ratings data on what people were watching. A reporting board lit up to indicate which homes were listening to which broadcasts. For years, Arbitron was a part of Control Data Corporation (CDC) until in 1992 it became a part of Ceridian Corporation before the company was split in 2001. Arbitron continued by renaming the old Ceridian Corporation while the spin-off firm took the Ceridian Corporation name and acted as accounting successor.

On December 18, 2012, The Nielsen Company announced that it would acquire Arbitron, its only competitor, for US$1.26 billion. The acquisition closed on September 30, 2013, and the company was re-branded as Nielsen Audio. As a condition of the deal to allow a monopoly, Nielsen was required to license its ratings data and technology to a third party for eight years.

== Methods ==
=== Survey ===
Arbitron's syndicated radio ratings service collects data by selecting a random sample of a population throughout the United States, primarily in 294 metropolitan areas, using a paper diary service 2‑4 times a year and the Portable People Meter (PPM) electronic audience measurement service 365 days a year.

The term commonly used in the radio industry for these ratings is Arbitron book, a carryover from the era when ratings were published in a softcover report that was mailed to clients. More specifically, in the diary-measured markets these reports were called the "Spring book", "Summer book", "Fall book", and "Winter book". Between these "books", Arbitron releases interim monthly reports called "Arbitrends", which contain data from the previous three months known as "rolling average" reports. The two interim reports would be known, for example, as "Spring, Phase I" and "Spring, Phase II".

Arbitron recruits diary survey respondents to note their listening habits in a seven-day paper diary and mail it back to Arbitron. The respondents are paid a small cash incentive for their participation. Turnaround time for release of data from the end of the survey period is approximately three weeks.

After collection, the data is marketed to radio broadcasters, radio networks, cable TV companies, advertisers, advertising agencies, out-of-home advertising companies, and the online radio industry. Major ratings products include cume (the cumulative number of unique listeners over a period), average quarter hour (AQH share – the average number of people listening in a given 15‑minute period), time spent listening (TSL), and market breakdowns by age, gender, and race/ethnicity. The "cume" only counts a listener once, whereas the AQH is a product of "cume" and time spent listening. For example, if you looked into a room and saw Fred and Jane, then 15 minutes later saw Fred with Sara. The "cume" would be 3 (Fred, Jane, Sara) and the AQH would be 2 (an average of two people in the room in a given 15‑minute period).

=== Portable People Meter ===
Responding to requests from its customers—radio broadcasters, ad agencies and advertisers—that expressed their interest in the collection of more accurate ratings data, Arbitron introduced the Portable People Meter (PPM) service in 2007.

The PPM is a wearable portable device, much like a pager or mobile phone, that electronically gathers subaudible codes that identify the source of a broadcast, such as a radio station. Arbitron recruits and compensates a cross-section of consumers to wear the meter for an average of one year and up to two years. The audience estimates generated from each monthly survey are used as the buy/sell currency for radio stations and advertisers/agencies.

As of December 2009, the PPM was measured in 33 media markets, including Houston, Philadelphia, Pittsburgh, New York City, Atlanta, Detroit, Long Island, Middlesex-Somerset-Union, Chicago, Los Angeles, Riverside-San Bernardino, San Francisco, Jacksonville, Baltimore, and San Jose. By 2010, 48 markets are being measured using the PPM.

== See also ==
- ComScore, an internet analytics company with which Arbitron is partnering to analyze cross-media management
- List of most-listened-to radio programs
- List of United States radio markets
- Nielsen ratings (for television programs)
- Radio & Records, periodical that published Arbitron data for commercial stations
- Radio Research Consortium, non-profit corporation which publishes Arbitron data for non-commercial stations
- The Media Audit
- Time spent listening (TSL), one of the metrics measured
