= Hunter Noack =

American pianist

Hunter Noack is an American pianist. He is the founder of the concert series In A Landscape in which he performs on a Steinway grand piano in remote locations across the American West.
