= William Scorer =

English architect (1843–1934)

- Born: 1843; Burwell, Lincolnshire
- Died: 1934 (aged 90–91); Richmond, Surrey
- Education: Articled to Henry Francis Goddard
- Occupation: Architect
- Practice: Watkins and Scorer. Scorer and Gamble

William Scorer (1843–1934) was an architect who worked mainly in Lincoln, but also in Liverpool and London.

== Career ==
He was born in Burwell, Lincolnshire into a farming family. He was educated at Boston Grammar School, and was a student at the Lincoln School of Art. Articled to Henry Francis Goddard of Lincoln. The 1861 Census records that he was living with the Goddards at 122, High Street, Lincoln. He worked for Culshaw and Sumners of Liverpool and then for 7 years for Edward Robert Robson, the City Surveyor for Liverpool. In 1871 Robson moved to London and Scorer appears to have accompanied him. Robson had been appointed architect to the London School Board, which was embarking on a massive school building programme. Scorer also designed some schools in his own name and gives his address as 7 Burleigh Street, Strand WC. In 1876 Scorer may have entered a short lived partnership with William Curtis Brangwyn, the father of the artist Frank Brangwyn. Brangwyn and Scorer entered the competition for Nottingham Education Institute and a print of their entry was published in the Building News. The competition was won by Lockwood and Mawson and their building became the Nottingham University College and the Arkwright Building of Nottingham Trent University. Then in 1878, he entered into a partnership with William Watkins, with offices both in London and Lincoln. In 1881 he was elected as an Associate of the Royal Institute of British Architects ARIBA. In 1881 he moved to Lincoln and the partnership with William Watkins, operated from St Edmond's Chambers, Lincoln. The partnership was dissolved on 31 December 1883. Scorer then moved to Bank Street Chambers, which was adjacent to St Swithin's Churchyard, Lincoln. From 1901 Henry Gamble joined him and formed the partnership of Scorer and Gamble. Scorer moved from Lincoln in 1913 to Richmond in Surrey, but still continued his partnership with Gamble until his death After his move to Richmond, he held a position with the Royal Institute of British Architects, also until his death He was a Lincoln Diocesan Surveyor and Surveyor to the Lawn Mental Institution in Lincoln. . Scorer was an active Freemason in a number of Lodges and was the Master of the Witham Lodge in Lincoln. His earlier buildings are in a Queen Anne style, while his later buildings combine Gothic Revival architecture elements. While living in London between 1874 and 1881 he was a member of the Artists Rifles, which was a Territorial Army Regiment

== Architectural Work by William Scorer ==
- Bernadette House, Formerly St Botolph's Vicarage, South Park, Lincoln. 1877. This was designed when Scorer was practising in London.

=== In Practice with William Watkins at St Edmond's Chambers, Silver Street. ===
- Lincoln Public Dispensary, Silver Street, Lincoln. with William Watkins 1878. Impressive building in Queen Anne Style, probably brick with red terracotta decoration. Advanced wing with three bays to right. First and second storeys of wing with canted bays, surmounted with a decorative pediment. This building appears to have been demolished before 1964.

=== Practice at Bank Chambers, Bank Street, Lincoln. ===
Scorer moved to Bank Street in April 1884.

- 102 High Street, Lincoln. (1887) Shop with living accommodation on three storeys and basement with earlier rear house, a substantial rebuild in 1887, of an earlier property. Arts and Crafts with tile hanging to third storey gable with oculus window.
- Former HSBC Bank, 25 High Street, Horncastle.(1894). Facing the Market Place. Built for the Lindsey and Lincoln Bank.
- 5-6 Bank Street, Lincoln. Offices for Page and Porter, Solicitors. 1898. Tudor Revival. Two storeys with two bays with three lights and additional light over decorative doorway. Brick with ashlar stringing, base coursing and dressing. Arched doorway with Tudoresque foliage and grinning faces on at ends of stringcourse above.

=== Scorer and Gamble ===
Most of the existing buildings by this practice appear to be by Gamble rather than Scorer.

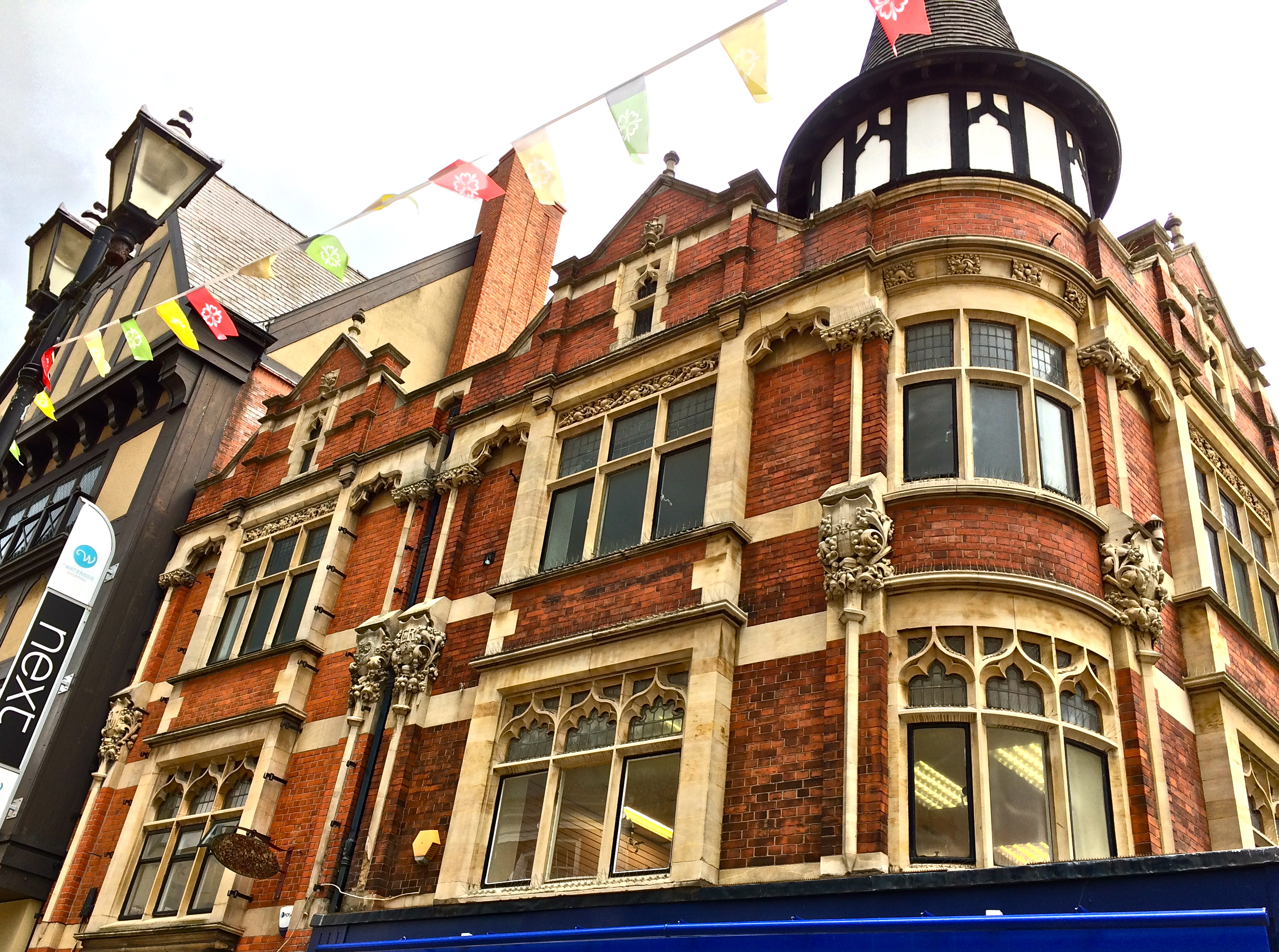
302 High Street Lincoln is now Carphone Warehouse, 1907

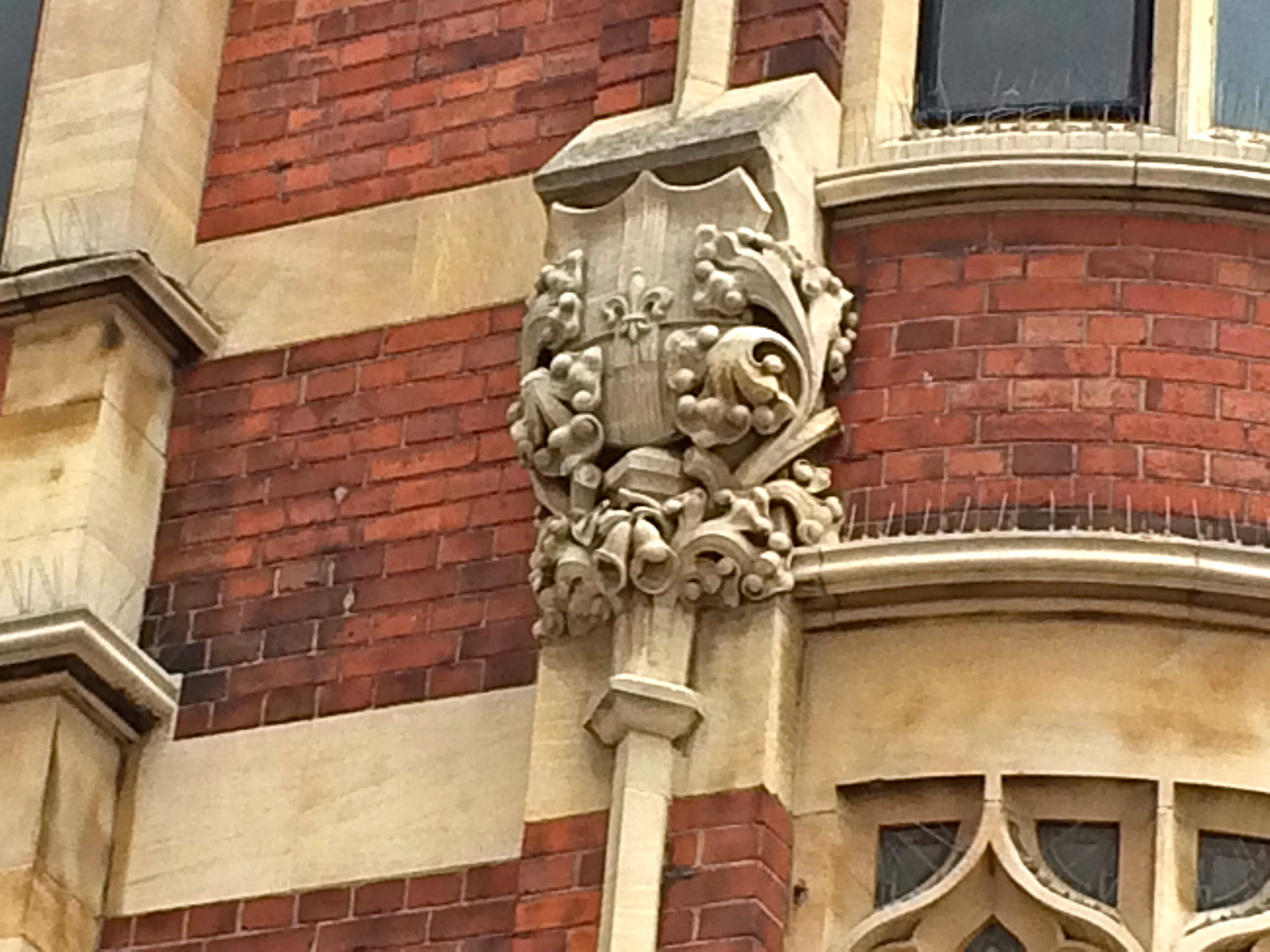
302 High Street Lincoln, carved stone detail with Lincoln Fleur-de-lys

- 302 High Street, Lincoln by Scorer and Gamble, 1907. In a late Tudor Gothic style with ornate carved decoration. Stylistically this appears to be the work of Scorer rather than Gamble. The south side overlooks the River Witham and has been badly disfigured by later additions which were since removed, but have scarred the building. It was originally built for a Mr J. Cooper and the southern portion was occupied by Lipton Teas. It is now occupied by Carphone Warehouse, with an unsympathetic fascia added at first-floor level.

=== Schools ===
- Extension to School in Parsonage Road, Rickmansworth, Hertfordshire. (1873) Probably demolished.
- School and master's residence Croxley Green. Hertfordshire (1874)
- Classrooms and master's house, West Hyde, Hertfordshire
- Village School. Farforth, near Louth. (1887). Built for the Farforth School Board. For 42 pupils.
- Extensions to Board School, Baumber, Lincolnshire (1892)
- St Andrews School, Scorer Street, Lincoln (later Bishop King School)

=== Church restoration work ===
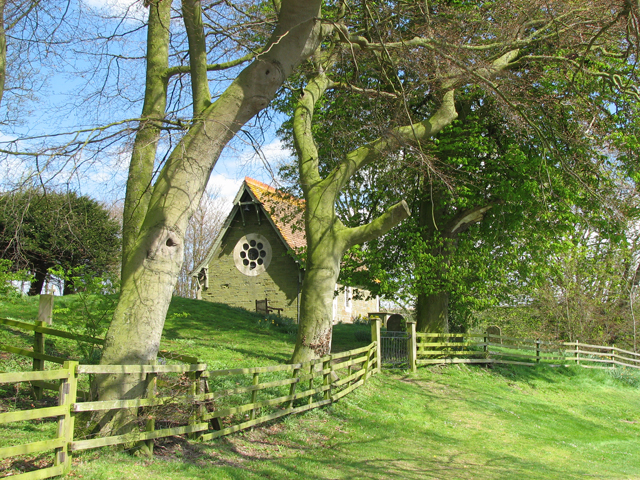
Saint Olave's Church, Ruckland, 1885

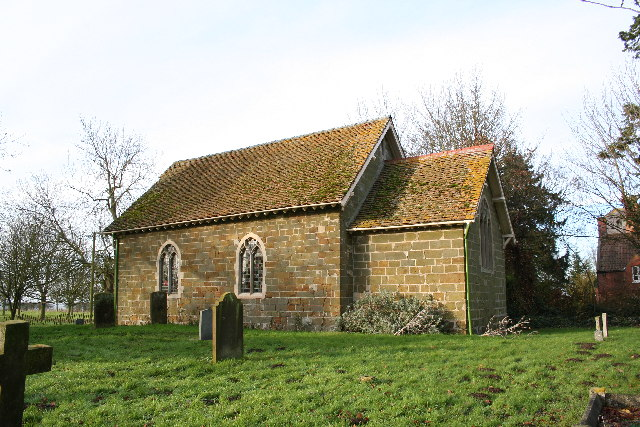
St.Margaret's church, Langton-by-Horncastle.

- Ruckland, Lincolnshire. New Church by W. Scorer, 1885. Lincolnshire's smallest church has a rose window at the west end with a bellcote cantilevered out from the gable.
- Langton, Lincolnshire1890 Church largely re-built.
- Baumber, Lincolnshire. (1892). Restoration of a largely Georgian Church
- Withern, Lincolnshire. Bellcote and porch by W. Scorer, 1894.
- Long Bennington, Lincolnshire. 1902–03.
- Doddington, Lincolnshire. Restoration by Scorer and Gamble. (1911)

== Literature ==
- Antram, N. (revised); Pevsner, N. & Harris, J., (1989), The Buildings of England: Lincolnshire, Penguin Books; reissued by Yale University Press.
- Brodie. A. (ed.) (2001), Directory of British Architects, 1834–1914: 2 vols. British Architectural Library, Royal Institute of British Architects.
