= The Score with Edmund Stone =

- Edmund Stone in 2011
- Running time: 1 hour
- Country of origin: United States
- Language: English
- Home station: KQAC
- Syndicates: Public Radio Exchange
- Hosted by: Edmund Stone (2006–2026)
- Created by: Edmund Stone
- Recording studio: Portland, Oregon
- Original release: 2006
- Website: www.thescore.org

The Score with Edmund Stone is a radio program that began in 2006. The program is produced by KQAC, All Classical Portland, and until 2026 was hosted by Edmund Stone. The program broadcasts film music weekly on Saturdays and Sundays. Each one-hour program features a specific composer, film genre or theme. It has been sponsored by Oregon-based whole grains brand Bob's Red Mill Natural Foods since 2008. Multiple cities across the United States air the program. As of February 2024, more than 825 episodes had been produced. On August 31, 2026, All Classical Radio (KQAC) announced that Edmund Stone had left the station, without giving a reason for his departure or indicating what it meant for the future of The Score beyond stating that the program would "continue in encore presentations for six months in national syndication, and through the end of 2026 on All Classical Radio".
