= Scores (computer virus) =

Macintosh computer virus

Malware details
- Technical name: Scores
- Aliases: Eric; Vult; NASA; San Jose Flu
- Type: Macintosh
- Subtype: Categorisation needed
- Classification: Virus
- Family: Unknown
- Isolation date: Spring 1988
- Origin: Unknown
- Author: Unknown

Scores was a computer virus affecting Macintosh machines. It was first discovered in Spring 1988. It was written by a disgruntled programmer and specifically attacks two applications that were under development at his former company. These programs were never released to the public.

== Overview ==
Scores infects the System, Notepad, and Scrapbook files under System 6 and System 7. There is a simple way to identify infection. Normal Notepad and Scrapbook icons will have specific icons under System 7, or little Macintosh icons under System 6. If the icons are blank document icons, it is a good indication the system is infected.

Scores begins to spread to other applications two days after infection. The Finder and DA Handler often become infected as well.

The second payload, activated after 4 days, will start causing crashes if programs with the ERIC or VULT signatures are run. Both signatures are found on programs written by Electronic Data Systems of Plano, Texas. If a program from the company is run, the virus will crash the system after 25 minutes.

The third payload activates after 7 days, and will actively try to stop programs with the VULT signature from writing to disk. If no write to disks happen within 10 minutes, the virus will crash the system.

The alleged author of the virus was questioned by the Federal Bureau of Investigation (FBI) soon after the virus was discovered. There were no federal laws with which to charge the author, so they remain free to this day. This loophole resulted in the "Computer Virus Eradication Act of 1988".
