= Radio Research Consortium =

Non-profit research company that provides listener data

Radio Research Consortium, Inc.
- Company type: Non-Profit
- Industry: Media Research
- Founded: 1981
- Headquarters: Olney, Maryland, United States
- Area served: United States
- Key people: Joanne Church, Past President
- Products: ratings data
- Website: rrconline.org

The Radio Research Consortium (RRC) is a non-profit research company based in Olney, Maryland which provides listener data on radio audiences to non-commercial stations in the United States. Data is obtained through a contract with Nielsen Audio.

== History ==
The company was founded in 1981 as an alliance of 14 stations to provide access to market data which was previously available only to commercial stations. The company made it possible for public radio stations to show advertisers and underwriters that they commanded a much larger share of the market than previously assumed. In the case of the San Francisco Market, for example, KQED-FM actually ranked 2nd or 3rd in 2005-2006 but was absent from traditional reporting of Arbitron data in publications such as Radio & Records which include only commercial stations.

RRC's founding employees include former Arbitron Employees including the former Manager of Production and Radio Market Reports. Today the company serves over 600 customers including The Corporation for Public Broadcasting, National Public Radio, and Public Radio International stations.

RRC has been criticized for contributing to the homogenization of public radio, particularly in their home market, Washington DC.

== See also ==
- Nielsen Audio
- National Public Radio
