= The Score =

The Score may refer to:

== Films and television ==
- The Score (1978 film), a Swedish film, released in Sweden as Lyftet
- The Score (2001 film), a crime drama film starring Robert De Niro and Edward Norton
- The Score (2005 film), a science fiction film by Kim Collier starring Jonathon Young
- The Score (2021 film), a British thriller film
- The Score (Philippine TV program), a Philippine sports news television program broadcast on ABS-CBN Sports and Action that debuted in 2014
- The Score (Singaporean TV series), a 2010 Singaporean television drama series broadcast on MediaCorp Channel 8
- The Score (2003 TV program), a TV documentary with Marc Shaiman and produced by Phil Ramone
- The Score Television Network, a Canadian sports channel now known as Sportsnet 360
- "The Score" (Rules of Engagement), a 2010 television episode

== Music ==
- The Score (band), American alternative-rock band
- The Score (album), 1996 album by the Fugees
- The Score, 2016 album by Aaron Pritchett
- The Score – An Epic Journey, soundtrack to the 2005 film Joyride

== Radio ==
- The Score, a weekly radio program syndicated nationally
- WSCR (The Score), a sports radio station in Chicago, Illinois
- WPRV, an AM radio station in Rhode Island that formerly broadcast a sports format as The Score
- WLRO (The Score 1210), an AM sports radio station in Baton Rouge
- WEAN-FM, an FM radio station in Rhode Island that formerly broadcast a sports format as The Score

== Literature ==
- The Score, a 1909 novella by Lucas Malet
- The Score, a 1963 novel by Donald E. Westlake, written as Richard Stark
- The Score, a 2016 novel by Elle Kennedy
- The Score (book), a 2026 non-fiction book by C. Thi Nguyen

== Other uses ==
- Score Media and Gaming, which uses theScore as its brand
- The Score, a prophecy from the video game Tales of the Abyss

== See also ==
- Score (disambiguation)
