= William Hayward (architect) =

English architect (??–c.1823)

William Haywood
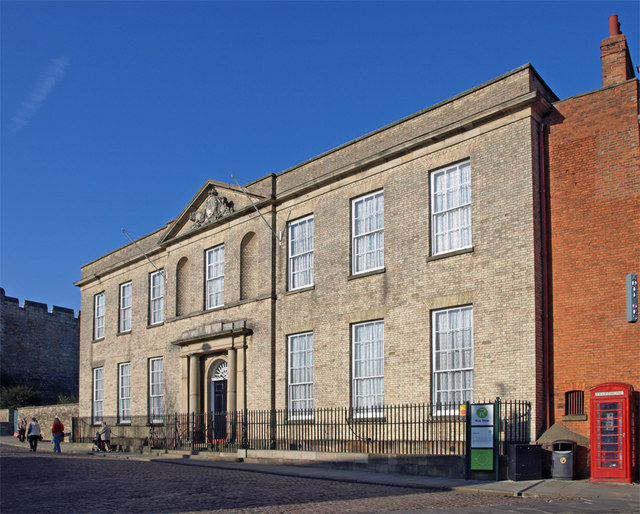
- The Judges' Lodging House, Castle Hill, Lincoln
- Born: Probably Lincoln
- Died: 1823 (or 1825); Lincoln
- Occupation: Architect
- Buildings: Kirton in Holland Church, Lincoln Judges Lodging and Lincoln Sessions House.

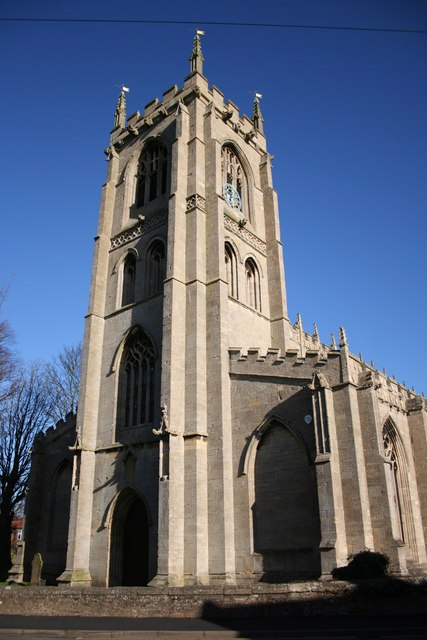
St.Peter and St.Paul's church tower. Kirton 1805

William Haywood (died probably in 1823) was an architect who worked in Lincoln, England. His father John who died in 1817 was mayor of Lincoln twice and worked as a mason. Haywood succeeded his father as mayor after his death in 1817. His grandfather, John Hayward (1708–78) was also a mason in Lincoln. William Hayward's great grandfather was Abraham Haywood an architect of Whitchurch, Shropshire who came to Lincoln around 1720. William Haywood succeeded William Lumby as Surveyor to Lincoln Cathedral in 1799 and Edward James Willson followed him in this position in 1823. William Hayward also succeeded William Lumby as Surveyor for the Lincolnshire County County Committee, which had responsibility for Lincoln Castle and the prison. Howard Colvin considered Hayward to be a competent designer in the ‘Regency’ style and that from the re-construction of Kirton in Holland church in 1804 had an understanding of Gothic architecture quite remarkable at that date. Hayward also rebuilt the tower of Wrangle church in a similar style in 1820.

== Architectural work ==
=== Public buildings and bridge ===
- Lincolnshire Shire Hall. Lincoln Castle, 1802. Rearranged interior. The building was demolished in 1823.

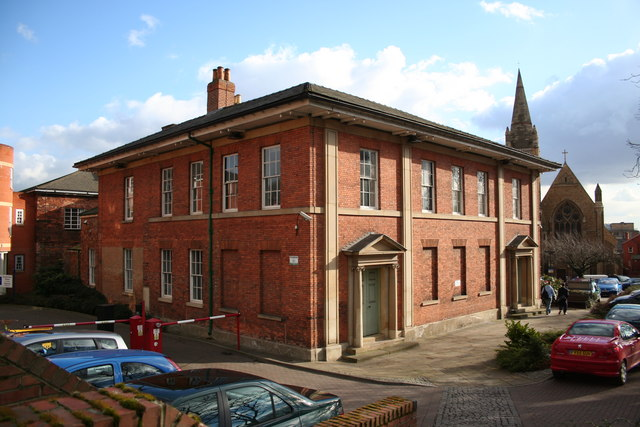
The Sessions House. Monks Road - now part of Lincoln College

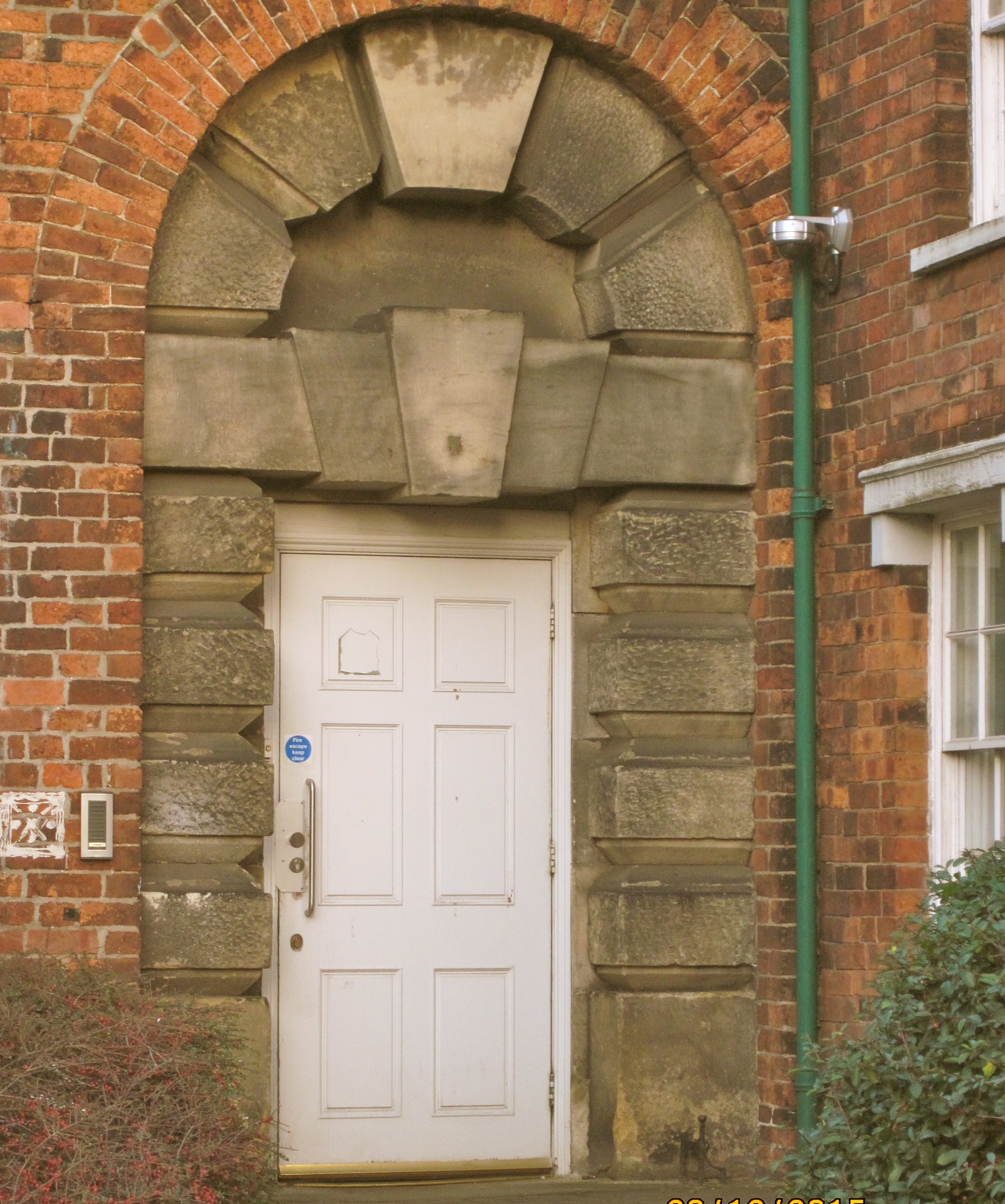
Lincoln Sessions House, Former Prison door

.

- The City Sessions House and Prison, Monks Road. 1805–9. The prison was built to replace the former squalid City prison adjacent to the Stonebow in Saltergate. The surviving door to the prison on the south side of the building is megalithic in appearance, presumably to give the impression that it was impregnable. The gaol continued in use until 1878, when the gaol on Greetwell road was opened and the City and County prisons were combined ‘ The magistrates courts continued until the new magistrates courts were opened in 1990 at St Marks in the High Street.
- The Judges Lodging's, Castle Hill, Lincoln. 1810–11. Whitish- yellow bricks giving the impression of stone-possibly the earliest example of the use of these bricks in Lincoln. Nine bays with t he three centre bays with pediment over. Stone doorway with Tuscan columns.
- Gowt's Bridge, 1813.

=== House ===
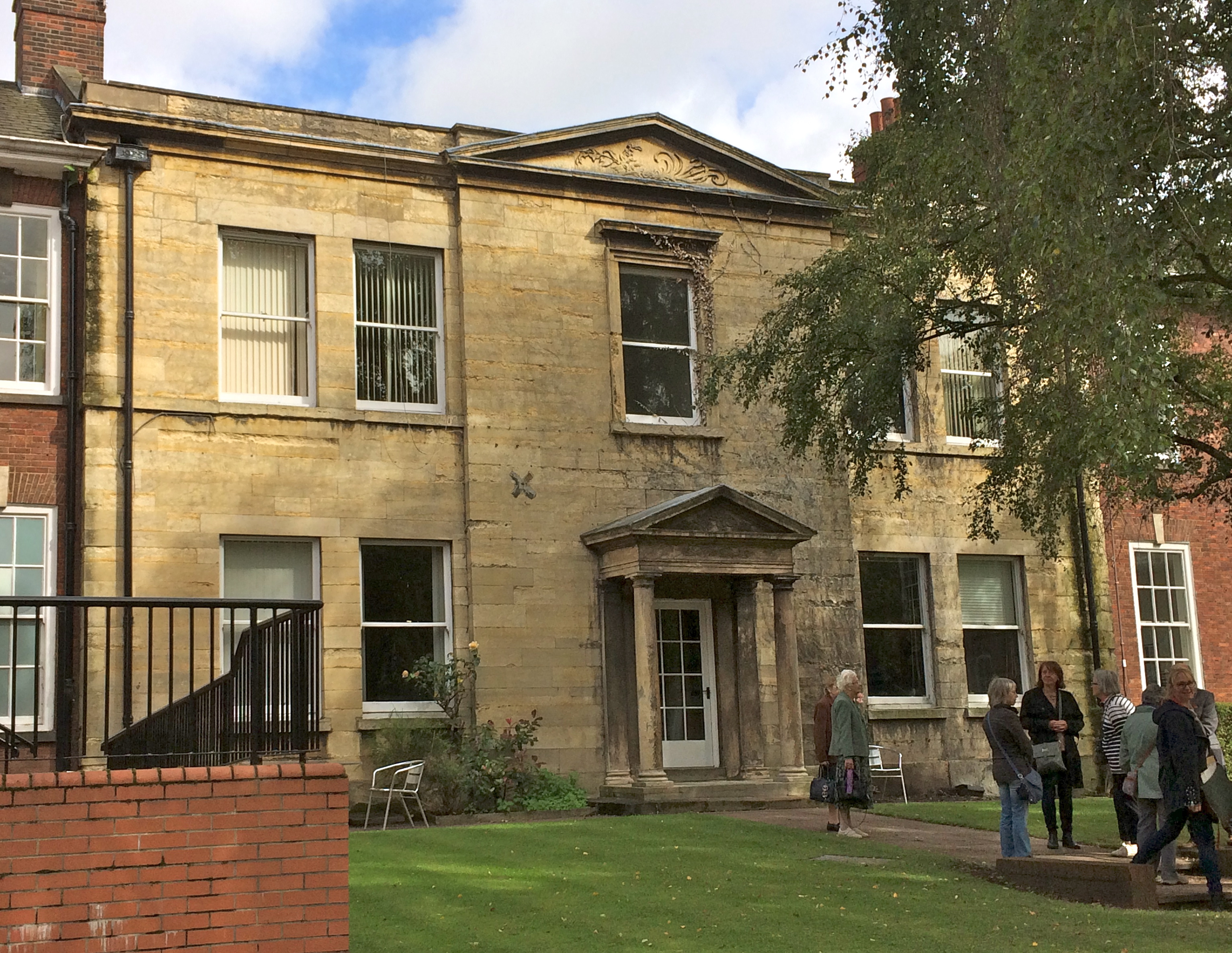
Newland House Lincoln 1824

- Newland House, Newland, Lincoln. House built in 1824 for Robert Hayward, a Lincoln solicitor, who was the brother of William Hayward. The house was incorporated into the upper courtyard of the Lindsey (now Lincolnshire) County Offices by the architects Scorer and Gamble in 1926–32.

=== Churches ===
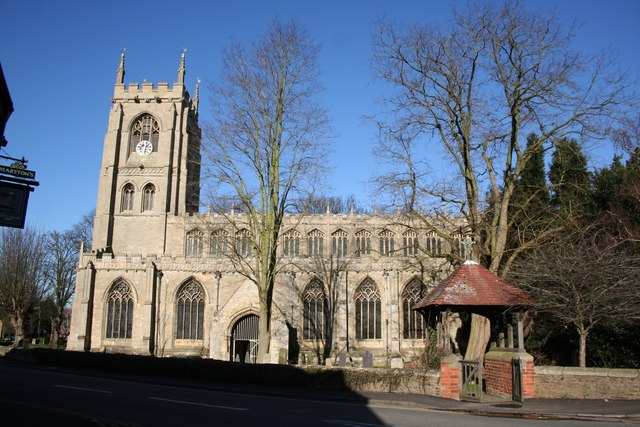
St.Peter and St.Paul's church, Kirton in Holland

- St Swithin's church, Lincoln. 1802–3. Rebuilt, but demolished 1869, before being re-built by James Fowler of Louth on an adjacent site.
- Lincoln Cathedral 1804. Rebuilt gable on south side of west transept.
- Kirton in Holland Church, Lincolnshire.(1804-5) Demolished central tower and transepts, shortened chancel and built new west tower incorporating features of the central tower.
- St Martin's Church, Lincoln. 1809. Rebuilt north aisle. The church was demolished about 1875.

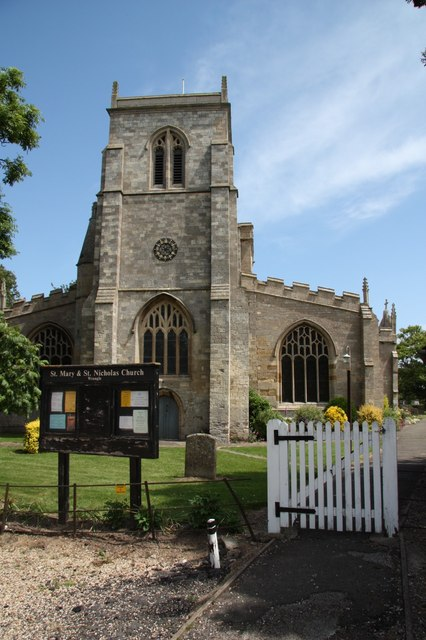
Tower and side aisles of Wrangle church

- St Mary and St Nicholas Church, Wrangle, Lincolnshire. In 1820 Hayward advertised for MASONS. PERSONS wishing to Contract for the TAKING DOWN and RE-BUILDING the TOWER of WRANGLE CHURCH, in the Archdeaconry of Lincoln, may see the Specifications for the same work on application to Mr. John Slater, Churchwarden; or at the office of Mr. Hayward, architect, Lincoln. The rebuilding appears to be very similar to the work at Kirton in Holland church and includes alterations and battlements on the gables of the aisles. This work is not noted in Pevsner's description of the church.
- Torksey church, alterations 1821–22.

=== Rectories and vicarages ===
- Metheringham Vicarage, Lincolnshire, altered 1808.
- Silk Willoughby 1813. New west front.

== Literature ==
- Antram N (revised), Pevsner N & Harris J, (1989), The Buildings of England: Lincolnshire, Yale University Press.
- Colvin H. A (1995), Biographical Dictionary of British Architects 1600-1840. Yale University Press, 3rd edition London, pg.485.
- Hobbs J.L.(1960), The Hayward Family of Whitchurch, Shropshire Magazine, Jan. 1960.
