= Service Corps of Retired Executives =

American business advisory organization

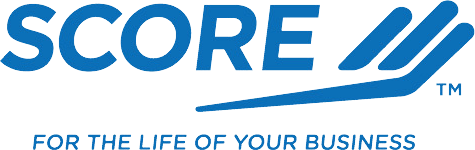
- Formation: 1964
- Purpose: Business education Business mentoring
- Headquarters: Herndon, Virginia
- Region served: United States
- Executive Director: Thomas Kim
- Parent organization: SCORE Association
- Budget: $21,000,000 in FY24
- Staff: 20
- Volunteers: 10,000
- Website: Official website

The Service Corps of Retired Executives, now known as SCORE, is a non-profit organization of volunteers who provide free mentoring, education programs, workshops, and webinars to small businesses. SCORE was a resource partner of the U.S. Small Business Administration (SBA), which administered a Congressional grant that provided SCORE with funding. SCORE is headquartered in Herndon, Virginia, with over 160 chapters located in offices located throughout the United States. It is the nation's largest network of volunteer, expert business mentors.

== History ==
SCORE was chartered by an Act of the U.S. Congress in 1964 to provide technical and managerial guidance to the business community, profit and not-for-profit organizations, and prospective entrepreneurs through the use of volunteer counselors. On October 5, 1964, SBA administrator, Eugene P. Foley officially launched SCORE. Walter H. Channing of Detroit, Michigan, served as its first president. By 1968 over 1,000 small businesses per month were receiving free business advice from SCORE.

A 2019 audit by the Small Business Administration Office of Inspector General (OIG) criticized SCORE, finding that SCORE officials did not effectively oversee SCORE's use of federal funds, inappropriately solicited donations for mentoring services, charged for publication material that did not include the required SBA acknowledgement statement, and improperly managed funds used for cosponsored activities. The OIG recommended that the SBA improve its oversight and monitoring of SCORE's use of government funds, and its reporting of performance results. The OIG also recommended that the SBA recover $713,986 of unallowable and unsupported costs.

By 2021 SCORE began to emphasize the importance of diversity, equity, and inclusion in business.

In 2023, Iowa Senator Joni Ernst introduced a bill in the U.S. Senate, S-1896, entitled the SCORE Act of 2023 which would "overhaul SCORE to meet the needs of today’s dynamic economy and improve support for female and rural business owners".

== Operations ==
SCORE is governed by a 17 member board of directors. Up until September 2025 it had a team of approximately 50 salaried employees at its headquarters in Herndon, Virginia who supported the organization of over 10,000 volunteers in 250 office locations throughout the U.S. Due to funding cuts from the SBA, SCORE reduced headquarters staff to about 20 employees in FY25. SCORE also consolidated chapters and now has about 165. Further chapter consolidations are expected for FY27 starting October 2026.

SCORE is exempt from federal and state income taxes on income under the provisions of Section 501(c)(3) of the Internal Revenue Code.

SCORE's website offers a small business library with "how-to" guides, downloadable templates, checklists, articles, videos, infographics, and blogs. The website also hosts online workshops, recorded webinars and interactive courses on demand. SCORE volunteer mentors give free and confidential business advice to business owners using different communication methods, including phone, video, email and in-person meetings. There are four types of SCORE volunteering roles: business mentors, workshop presenters, subject matter experts, and chapter support roles. From time to time SCORE gives the Walter H Channing Award. Named in honor of its founding president, it is the highest honor for volunteer service within SCORE.

== Performance claims ==
SCORE claimed SCORE clients returned $45.42 to the US Treasury for each dollar of the $17 million allocated to SCORE in FY24. This amounts to $772 million. SCORE also claimed 143,623 jobs were created by SCORE clients in FY24. This is approximately 10% of the 1.45 million jobs created by small businesses in FY24. None of the claims have been audited by SCORE or the SBA.

== Funding ==
SCORE was primarily supported by a federal government grant along with workshop fees and contributions.

SCORE received a federal grant of $17.3 million in FY24, which was 80% of the organization's $21.7 million of revenue. In FY25 SCORE received SBA funding until March 2025. The remainder of the FY 2025 funding was withheld by the OMB. SCORE received the remainder of the FY25 grant in June 2026. SCORE funding was not included in the FY26 budget request sent to Congress in May 2025 by the Director of the Office of Management and Budget Russell T. Vought on behalf of President Donald Trump. However, Congress allocated $17 million for FY26. SCORE has not received any FY26 money from the SBA.

The US Government's proposed budget for 2027 calls for the elimination of SCORE
