= Saint Giles (disambiguation) =

Saint Giles, St Giles, or St Giles' may refer to:

== People ==
- Saint Giles, a 7th-8th century Christian hermit saint
- Blessed Aegidius of Assisi (died 1262)

== Churches ==
=== Australia ===
- St Giles' Presbyterian Church, Geelong, Victoria

=== Canada ===
- St. Giles Presbyterian Church (Ottawa), Ontario

=== Czech Republic ===
- St. Giles' Church (Prague)

=== Germany ===
- Aegidienkirche, Braunschweig
- St Giles' Church, Erfurt
- Aegidienkirche, Hanover
- Aegidienkirche, Heilbad Heiligenstadt
- Aegidienkirche, Lübeck
- Ägidienkirche, Speyer

=== Italy ===
- Sant'Egidio (church) in Trastevere, Rome

=== Poland ===
- St. Giles' Church, Inowłódz
- Church of St. Giles, Kraków

=== Slovakia ===
- St. Giles' Church (Bardejov) in Bardejov

=== Spain ===
- San Gil Church in Burgos, Spain

=== United Kingdom ===
England

- Church of St. Giles, Killamarsh, Derbyshire
- St Giles' Church, Balderton, Nottinghamshire
- St Giles' Church, Barrow, Shropshire
- St Giles' Church, Bodiam, Bodiam, East Sussex
- St Giles' Church, Camberwell, London
- St Giles' Church, Cambridge
- St Giles Church, Carburton, Nottinghamshire
- St. Giles' Catholic Church, Cheadle, Staffordshire
- St Giles' Church, Copmanthorpe, York
- St. Giles' Church, Costock, Nottinghamshire
- St. Giles' Church, Cromwell, Nottinghamshire
- St. Giles' Church, Cropwell Bishop, Nottinghamshire
- St Giles' Church, Darlton, Nottinghamshire
- St Giles Church, Durham, County Durham
- St Giles' Church, Edingley, Nottinghamshire
- St Giles' Church, Exhall, Warwickshire
- St Giles' Church, Elkesley, Nottinghamshire
- St Giles' Church, Grimsby, Lincolnshire
- St Giles' Church, Holme, Nottinghamshire
- St Giles' Church, Horsted Keynes, West Sussex
- St Giles' Church, Ickenham, Hillingdon, London
- St Giles' Church, Imber, Wiltshire
- Church of St Giles, Leigh-on-Mendip, Somerset
- St Giles Church, Lincoln, Lincolnshire
- St Giles' Church, Longstone, Derbyshire
- St Giles' Church, Matlock, Derbyshire
- St Giles' Church, Normanton, Derby
- St Giles' Church, Norwich, Norfolk
- St Giles' Church, Ollerton, Nottinghamshire
- St Giles' Church, Oxford
- St Giles' Church, Reading, Berkshire
- St Giles' Church, Sandiacre, Derbyshire
- St Giles' Church, Sheldon, Birmingham
- St Giles' Church, Shrewsbury, Shropshire
- St Giles' Church, Skelton, York
- St Giles' Church, South Mimms, Hertfordshire
- St Giles' Church, Standlake, Oxfordshire
- St Giles's Church, Tattenhoe, Milton Keynes
- Church of St Giles, Totternhoe, Bedfordshire
- St. Giles Church, West Bridgford, Nottinghamshire
- St Giles Church, Willenhall, Walsall, West Midlands
- St Giles Church, Wormshill, Kent
- St Giles-without-Cripplegate, London
- St Giles in the Fields, London

Scotland

- St Giles' Cathedral, Edinburgh
- St Giles' Church, Elgin, Moray

Wales

- St Giles' Church, Wrexham

=== United States ===
- Saint Giles Episcopal Church in Moraga, California, United States

== Places ==
=== Trinidad and Tobago ===
- Saint Giles Island

=== United Kingdom ===
- St Giles, London, a district
- St Giles Circus, a street in London
- St Giles', Oxford, England
- Chalfont St Giles, Buckinghamshire, England
- Houghton St Giles, Norfolk
- Wimborne Saint Giles
- St Giles Estate, Lincoln

== Other uses ==
- St. Giles (horse), a Thoroughbred racehorse, winner of the 1832 Epsom Derby
- St. Giles (Hebron, Maryland), an historic house in the United States
- St Giles Fair, held annually in Oxford, England
- St Giles International, an English language school group
- The Leper of Saint Giles, a 1981 novel by Ellis Peters
- Community of Sant'Egidio, a Catholic lay society
- HMAS St Giles, a tugboat of the Royal Navy and Royal Australian Navy

== See also ==
- Saint-Gilles (disambiguation)
- Sant'Egidio (disambiguation)
- St. Egidien (disambiguation)
