= Saint-Gilles =

Saint-Gilles or Saint Giles (c. 650 – c. 710) was a Greek Christian hermit saint.

Saint-Gilles may also refer to:

== Belgium ==
- Saint-Gilles, Belgium, a municipality in the Brussels-Capital Region
- Saint-Gilles Prison

== Canada ==
- Saint-Gilles, Quebec, a parish in Quebec
- Val-Saint-Gilles, Quebec, a municipality in Quebec

== France ==
- Saint-Gilles, Gard, a commune in the Gard department
  - Abbey of Saint-Gilles
- Saint-Gilles, Ille-et-Vilaine, a commune in the Ille-et-Vilaine department
- Saint-Gilles, Indre, a commune in the Indre department
- Saint-Gilles, Manche, a commune in the Manche department
- Saint-Gilles, Marne, a commune in the Marne department
- Saint-Gilles, Saône-et-Loire, a commune in the Saône-et-Loire department
- Saint-Gilles-Croix-de-Vie, a commune in the Vendée department
- Saint-Gilles-de-Crétot, a commune in the Seine-Maritime department
- Saint-Gilles-de-la-Neuville, a commune in the Seine-Maritime department
- Saint-Gilles-des-Marais, a commune in the Orne department
- Saint-Gilles-du-Mené, a commune in the Côtes-d'Armor department
- Saint-Gilles-les-Bois, a commune in the Côtes-d'Armor department
- Saint-Gilles-les-Forêts, a commune in the Haute-Vienne department
- Saint-Gilles-Pligeaux, a commune in the Côtes-d'Armor department
- Saint-Gilles-Vieux-Marché, a commune in the Côtes-d'Armor department
- Saint-Gilles, Réunion, a village in the Réunion island overseas department

== People ==
- Léon Péan de Saint-Gilles (1832–1862), French chemist

== Elsewhere ==
- Saint Gilles, the name by the Crusaders for Sinjil, a Palestinian town on the West Bank

== See also ==
- Saint Giles (disambiguation)
