= Wrentmore =

The surname Wrentmore originates from England. Exact dates are uncertain, although possibly Wrentmore came from the Wraunmauer name within the reign of Richard I c. 1190.

The name has been traced to St Giles Church in Leigh-upon-Mendip in Somerset, and also to the village of Colford or Coleford, Somerset.

Those with the Wrentmore surname can be found in large clusters in South Wales, where it is believed that when the coal around the Coleford area of Somerset ran out, the Wrentmore families left England to cross the border into Wales to mine for coal. The Wrentmore name is found in large clusters in Ohio, United States.

People with the surname include:

- Frank Wrentmore (1884–?), Welsh rugby union and professional rugby league footballer
- Godfrey Wrentmore (1893–1953), South African cricketer and rugby union footballer
- Stephen Wrentmore, British theatre director, working in the USA
