= Giles Hussey =

Giles Hussey may refer to:

- Giles Hussey (painter)
- Giles Hussey (tennis)
