= Sant'Egidio =

Sant'Egidio may refer to:

- Saint Giles (640?–720?), known as Egidio in Italian
- Community of Sant'Egidio, an international Christian lay community
- Sant'Egidio, Rome (Trastevere), the church from which the community of Sant'Egidio takes its name
- Sant'Egidio (Mantua), a church in Mantua, Italy
- Perugia San Francesco d'Assisi – Umbria International Airport, formerly known as Perugia Sant'Egidio Airport

== Placenames ==
- Sant'Egidio alla Vibrata, a comune in the province of Teramo, Abruzzo
- Sant'Egidio del Monte Albino, a comune in the province of Salerno, Campania
- Sant'Egidio, a hamlet of the comune of Ferrara

== See also ==
- Saint Giles (disambiguation)
