= Manor of Broad Hempston =

Historic manor in Devon, England

The manor of Broad Hempston (anciently Great Hempston, Hempston Cauntelow) was a historic manor situated in Devon, England, about 4 miles north of Totnes. The present village known as Broadhempston was the chief settlement within the manor and remains the location of the ancient parish church of St Peter and St Paul.

== Descent of the manor ==
=== Domesday Book ===
The manor is listed in the Domesday Book of 1086 as Hamistone (later called Hempston Cantilupe, later Broad Hempston), the 43rd of the 79 Devonshire holdings of Robert, Count of Mortain, 2nd Earl of Cornwall (c. 1031–1090) uterine half-brother and a major Devon Domesday Book tenants-in-chief of King William the Conqueror. His tenant was Hamelin of Devonshire and Cornwall. It was situated within Haytor hundred.

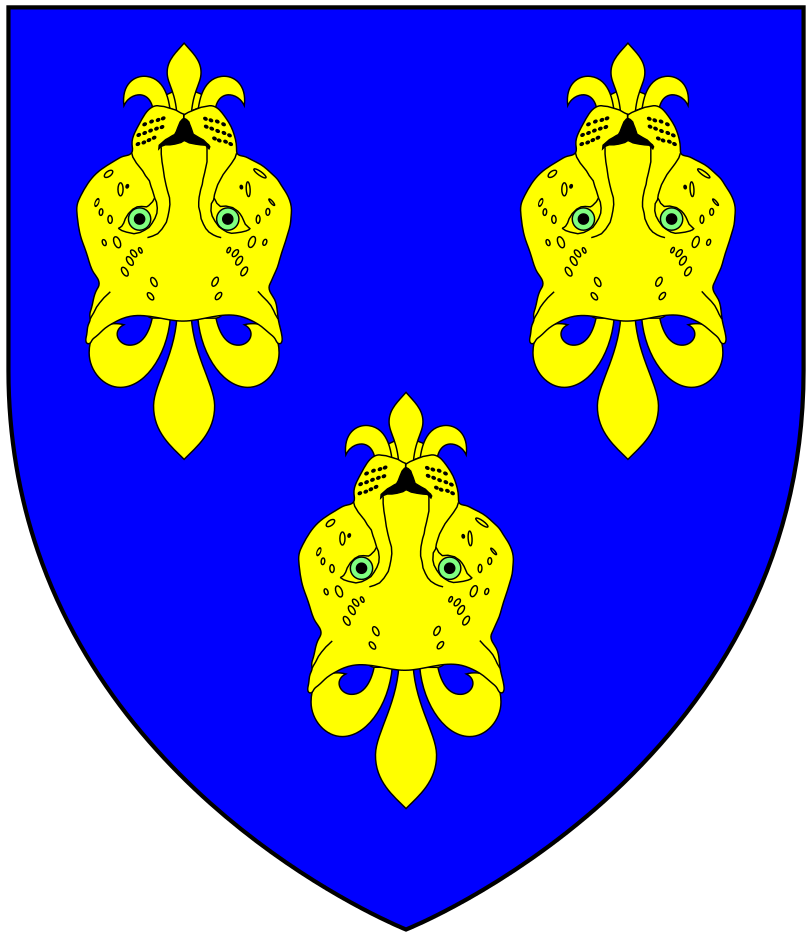
Arms of Cantilupe of Hempston Cantelow

=== Cantilupe ===
In the Book of Fees (pre-1302) it was held by William III de Cantilupe (d.1254), feudal baron of Totnes in Devon seated at Totnes Castle about 4 miles south of Broadhempston, and feudal baron of Eaton Bray in Bedfordshire, either in-chief from the honour of Mortain or from the Earldom of Cornwall. From this family's name the manor gained a suffix to become Hempston Cauntelow, as did several other manors in England, for example Aston Cantlow in Warwickshire. The church of Broad Hempston was given by William de Cantilupe to Studley Priory in Warwickshire (of which the Cantilupe family were patrons), to whom the great tithes were appropriated.

He was the son and heir of William II de Cantilupe (d.1251) by his wife Millicent (alias Maud) de Gournai, daughter of Hugh de Gournai and widow of Amaury de Montfort (d.1210/13), Earl of Gloucester and Count of Évreux. In 1238 William II de Cantilupe was granted the wardship and marriage of Eva de Braose (d.1255), one of the daughters and co-heiresses of William de Braose (d.1230), Lord of Abergavenny and feudal baron of Totnes. He thus married off Eva de Braose to his son William III de Cantilupe (d.1254), who thereby inherited the Braose lands, including a moiety of the feudal baron of Totnes.

The male line died out on the death of George de Cantilupe (1252–1273) Lord of Abergavenny (son of William III de Cantilupe (d.1254)), whose two sisters were heirs to most of his lands, including the feudal baron of Totnes, but not seemingly to Hempston, which according to Pole (d.1635), descended to Eleanor Cantilupe, great-niece of William III de Cantilupe (d.1254). Risdon (d.1640) states that Eleanor Cantilupe's grandfather was "John de Cantalupe, a younger son of the Lord Cantalupe, (who) was made baron of Hempston and called to Parliament in King Edward I's age, who had issue Nicholas Lord Cantalupe of Hempston, whose daughter Eleanor being married unto Sir Thomas West, brought his inheritance into that family".

Arms of West

=== West ===
Eleanor Cantilupe, heiress of Hempston, married Sir Thomas West (1251-1344) and Hempston became the inheritance of their descendants, created Barons De La Warr. A later Baron De la Warre sold the manor to the Rowe family. The family is today represented by the Sackville family (until 1871 "Sackville-West") of Buckhurst Park, Sussex, Baron De la Warr, Viscount Cantelupe, Baron Buckhurst and Earl De La Warr, which quarters the arms of Cantilupe in the second quarter.

=== Rowe ===
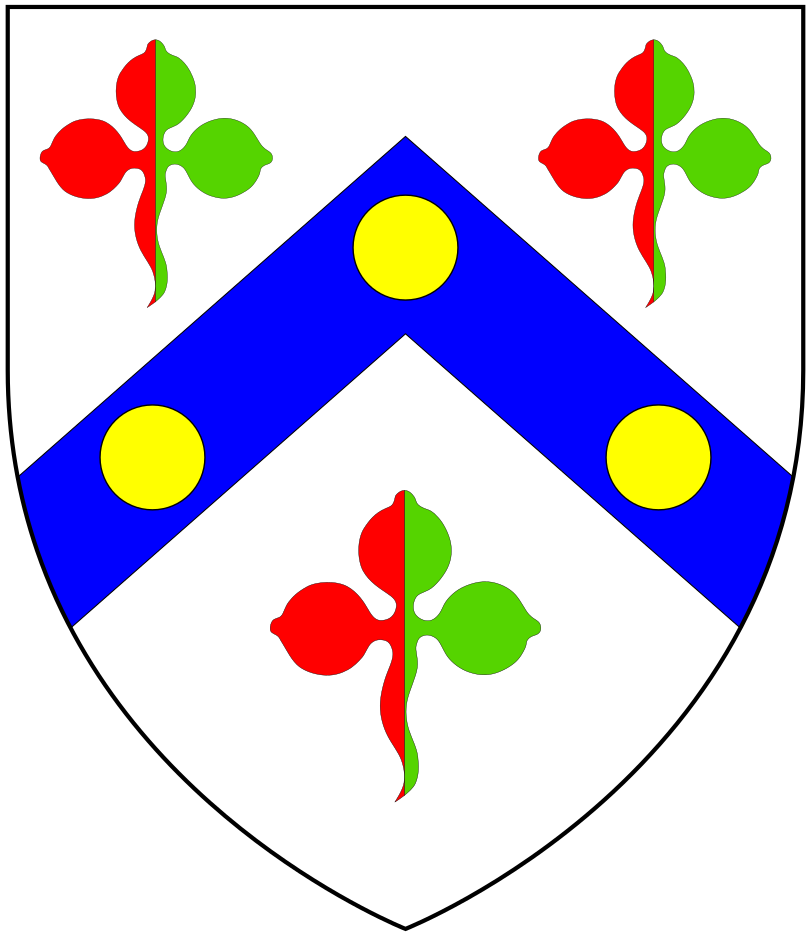
Arms of Rowe of Kingston

Hempston was purchased from the West family by John Rowe (1509-1592) of Kingston in the parish of Staverton, Devon, whose monumental brass survives at Staverton Church. He was the son and heir of John Rowe (d. 1544) of Kingston, serjeant-at-law. It remained a possession of the Rowe family for several generations. A branch of the Rowe family lived at Bearton, within the parish of Broad Hempston, for nearly two and a half centuries. Giles Hussey (1710–1788), the artist who adopted the theory of drawing his portraits according to musical or harmonic proportion, resided some years at Bearton with his nephew Mr. Rowe (d. pre-1822) and died there in 1788 and was buried at Broad Hempston Church. Giles Hussey had inherited an ancient family estate in Dorset, which he bequeathed to his nephew Mr. Rowe of Bearton, who in compliance with the bequest adopted the surname Hussey. In 1822 Bearton was the property of his widow, and was occupied as a farm-house.

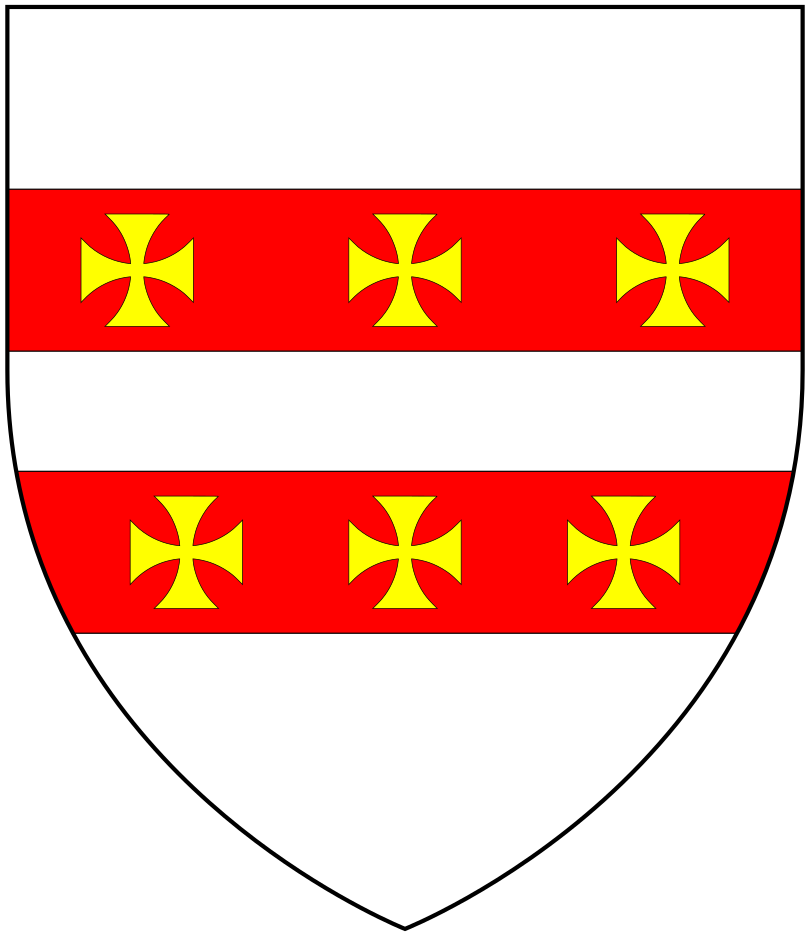
Arms of Martin of Hempston Cauntelow

=== Martin ===
As recorded in the Heraldic Visitation of Devon in 1620, the occupant in 1620 was William II Martin "of Hempston Cauntelow" son and heir of William I Martin (d.1610) of Totnes (son and heir of Thomas Martin (d.1588) of Salisbury, Wiltshire, Mayor of Totnes by his wife Christiana Savery, a daughter of Richard Savery of Totnes) by his wife Joane Rashleigh, a daughter of John Rashleigh of Foye in Cornwall. William II Martin married twice and had progeny by each wife: firstly to Anne Huckmore (d.1616) daughter of Richard Huckmore of Berry Pomeroy; secondly to his cousin Dorothie Savery, a daughter of Christopher savery, Mayor of Totnes in 1593 and Sheriff of Devon in 1620. In the year 1618 Robert Gunsley, Rector of Titsey in Surrey, gave the parsonage of Broad Hempston, with all lands and tithes thereto belonging, to the towns of Rochester and Maidstone in Kent, specifying that a moiety of the produce was to be distributed in bread, among the poor of the several parishes of each town.

=== Champion ===
It was sold by the Rowe family (sic, Risdon) to Joseph Champion (d. pre-1779) of Northleigh House. A deed dated 1779 survives recording the sale by his four children of lands in Broadhempston to Sir John Duntze, 1st Baronet, catalogued as follows:

"Indenture recording the sale of lands (lease & release) in Broadhempston dated 28 September 1779 between Sir John Duntze of Rockbeare House in the county of Devon, Baronet, William Maxsworth of the city of Exeter, Esquire, Joseph Sanders of the same city, merchant, and Daniel Hamilton of the same city, Esquire (proprietors of the City Bank) of the first part; Joseph Champion of Kingston, Gentleman, John Champion, Gentleman, Mary Champion, Spinster, and Sarah Champion, Spinster (four children of Joseph Champion late of Northleigh House, Esquire, deceased) of the second part; and William Mann of Broadhempston in the county of Devon, Yeoman, of the third part. Sale of a close of land commonly known as Pitpark or Quarry park by estimation 4 acres part and parcel of the Manor of Hempston in the parish of Broadhempston, Devon. Signature of Sir John Duntze, Baronet, who was the Member of Parliament for Tiverton, Devon, in 1779. Good condition vellum written in English. 8 Signatures with red wax seals. 70 by 42 cm."

=== Duntze ===
Broadhempston was purchased from the Champion family by Sir John Duntze, 1st Baronet (c. 1735 – 1795) of Rockbeare, near Exeter, a Member of Parliament for Tiverton from 1768 until his death in 1795. He was the son (by his English wife from Devon) of an immigrant merchant from Bremen in Germany, and was a clothier and general merchant at Exeter and a partner in the Exeter Bank (alias "Duntze, Sanders, Hamilton & Co."). He died beset by financial difficulties.

=== Tozer ===
In about 1781 Duntze sold Broadhempston to John Tozer of Pool House in the parish of Broadhempston.
