= St Peter at Arches Church, Lincoln =

Coordinates: 53°13′46.77″N 0°32′23.76″W

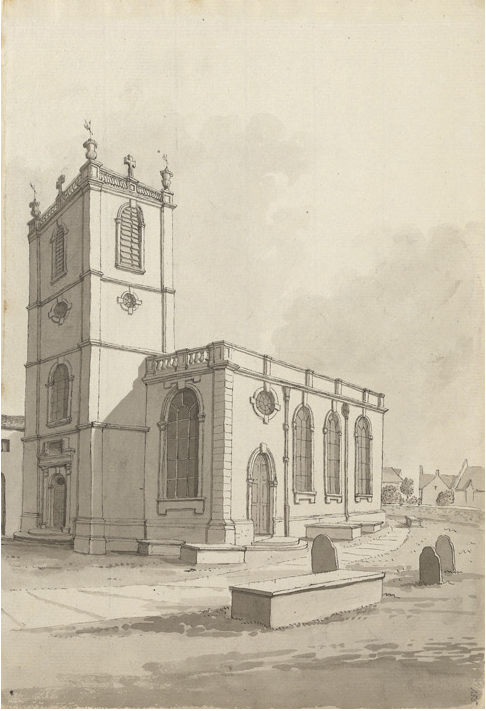
- St Peter at Arches Church, by Samuel Hieronymus Grimm c.1784.

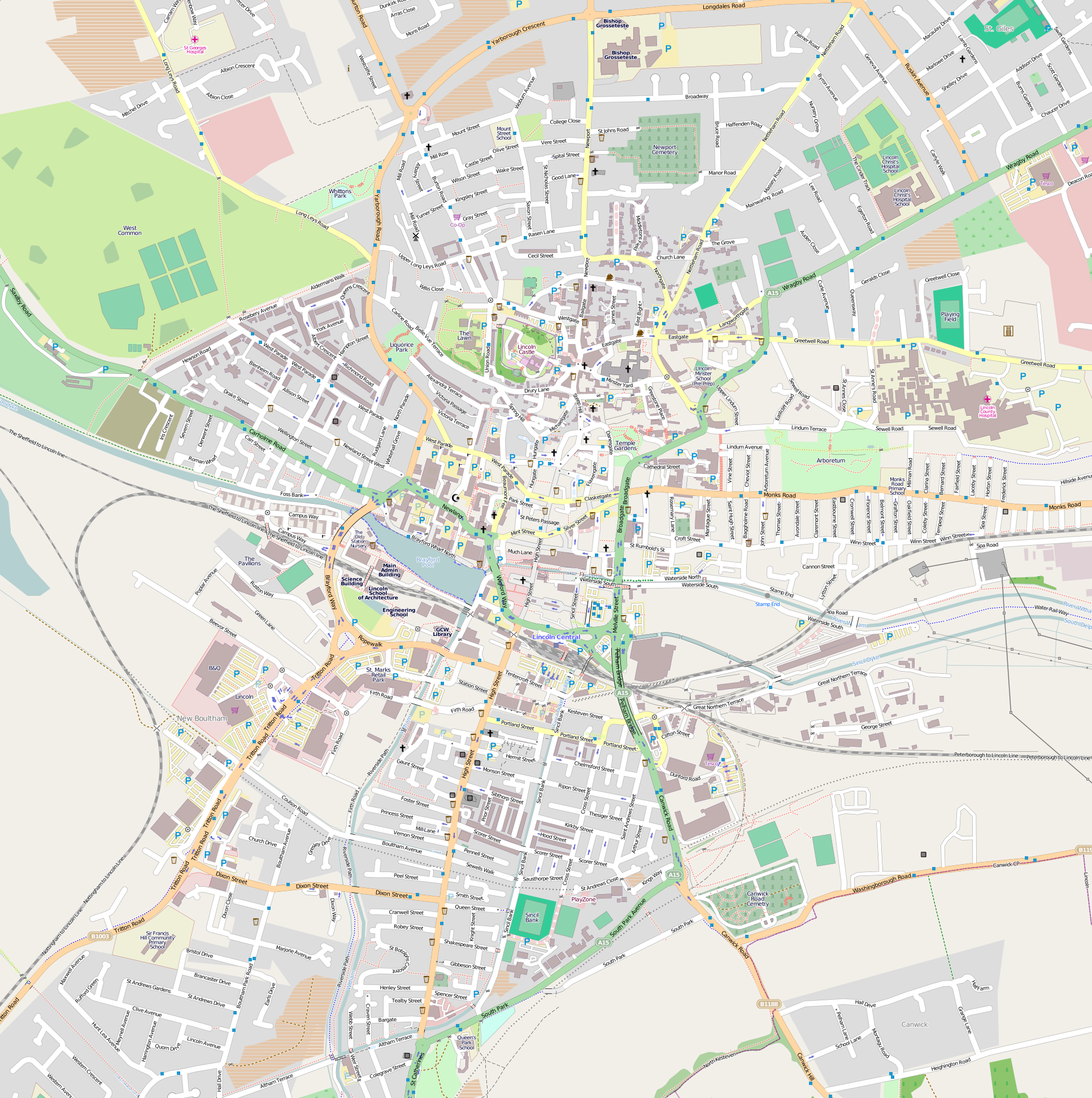
- Shown within Lincoln
- OS grid reference: SK 97567 71291
- Location: Lincoln, Lincolnshire
- Country: England
- Denomination: Church of England

Architecture
- Functional status: Demolished 1932 and re-constructed as St Giles on the St Giles Estate
- Architect: Francis or William Smith of Warwick
- Style: Georgian
- Years built: 1720–24

Administration
- Diocese: Lincoln

St Peter at Arches, Church, Lincoln was an ancient church in Lincoln, England, that was demolished and re-built c. 1720–24 by either Francis or William Smith of Warwick. The church was sited just to the north of the junction of the High Street and Silver Street and close to the Guildhall and Stonebow, Lincoln.

== The 1720–24 Church ==
While the architect of St Peter's was either Francis or William Smith, the supervision of its construction was entrusted to Abraham Hayward, who came from Whitchurch, Shropshire. The design of the church owes much to St Alkmund's Church, Whitchurch. Abraham Hayward built himself a house on a site adjacent St Peter's church, which had previously been the Taylors' Hall in Lincoln. The Haywards were to become a leading family of architects and builders in Lincoln for the next 100 years. This church was built with stone from the Roche Abbey quarries from Yorkshire. For many years St Peter at Arches acted as the Corporation church of the City of Lincoln.

The chancel and apse of the church were decorated with a fresco of the Ascension by the Venetian artist Vincenzo Damini who also carried out some work at Lincoln Cathedral. Damini's oil modello for the work survives.

== Demolition and reconstruction 1932 to 1936–38 ==
St Peter at Arches Church was demolished in 1932 together with the Buttermarket, an early Georgian building of 1737, which stood immediately to the north of the church facing the High Street. Material from the church was used to construct St Giles Church in Lamb Gardens on the St Giles Estate on the north-east side of Lincoln in 1936. The architect was W. G. Watkins (son of William Watkins). The plan of the rebuilt church is similar to that of the old church, but it has been lengthened by one bay and it was rebuilt in brick re-using the stone dressings from the old church. The gabled and rusticated front of the Buttermarket was rebuilt to plans by the architect Robert Atkinson in 1938 on a site on Sincil Street, just south of the river Witham. This building continues to serve as an enlarged market hall.

Norwich Union House was constructed on the site St Peter's Church in 1936, in a classical Neo-Georgian style by the architect Phillip Nicholls of Leeds. The frontages on High Street and Silver street are brick faced with an ashlar stone faced shop frontage at the corner. The Lincoln City coat of arms is centrally placed with a rectangular cupola above. On either side are two stone urns on a ledge, which were on the tower of St Peter's church.

Gallery

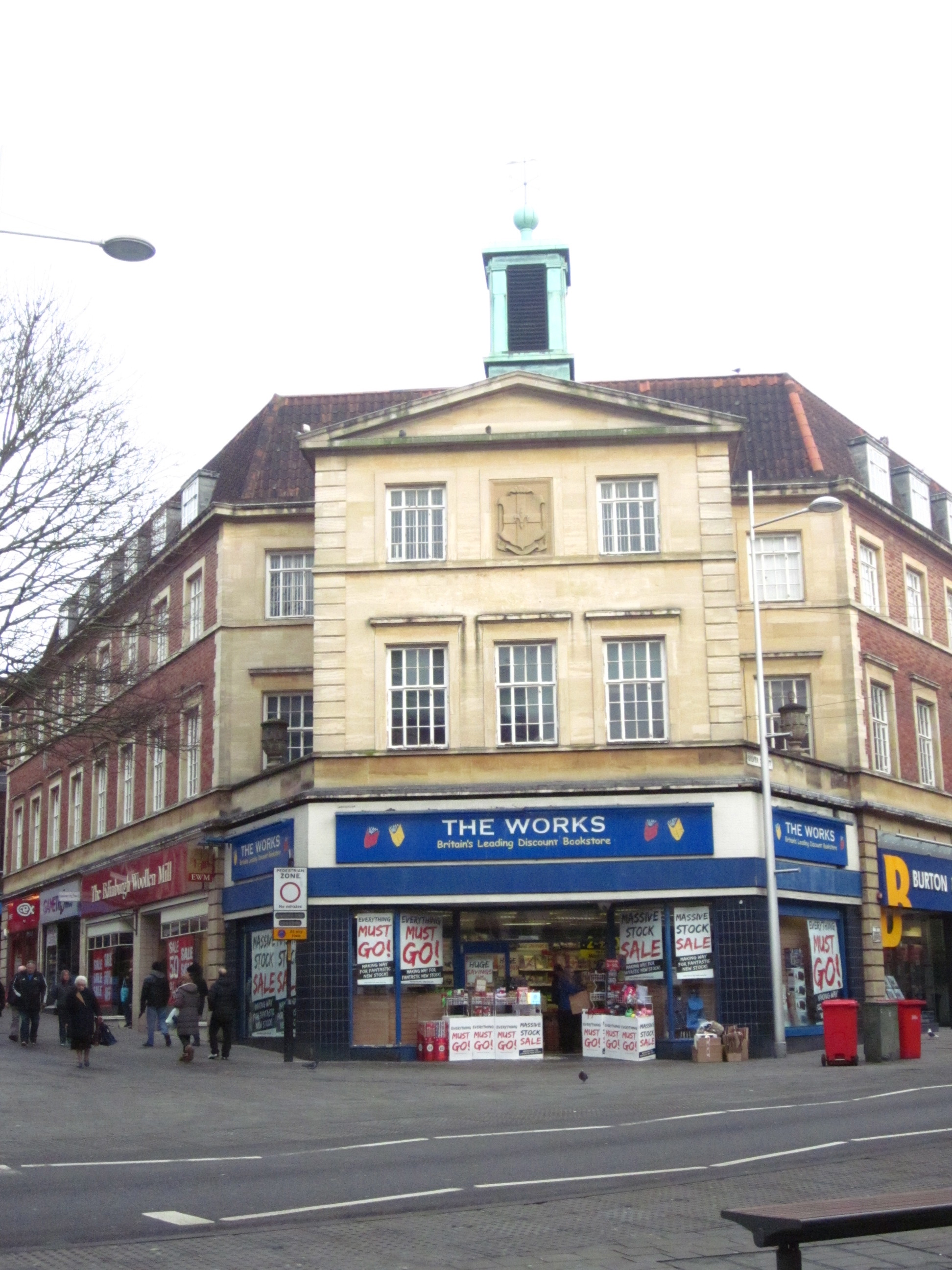
Former Norwich Union Building, High Street

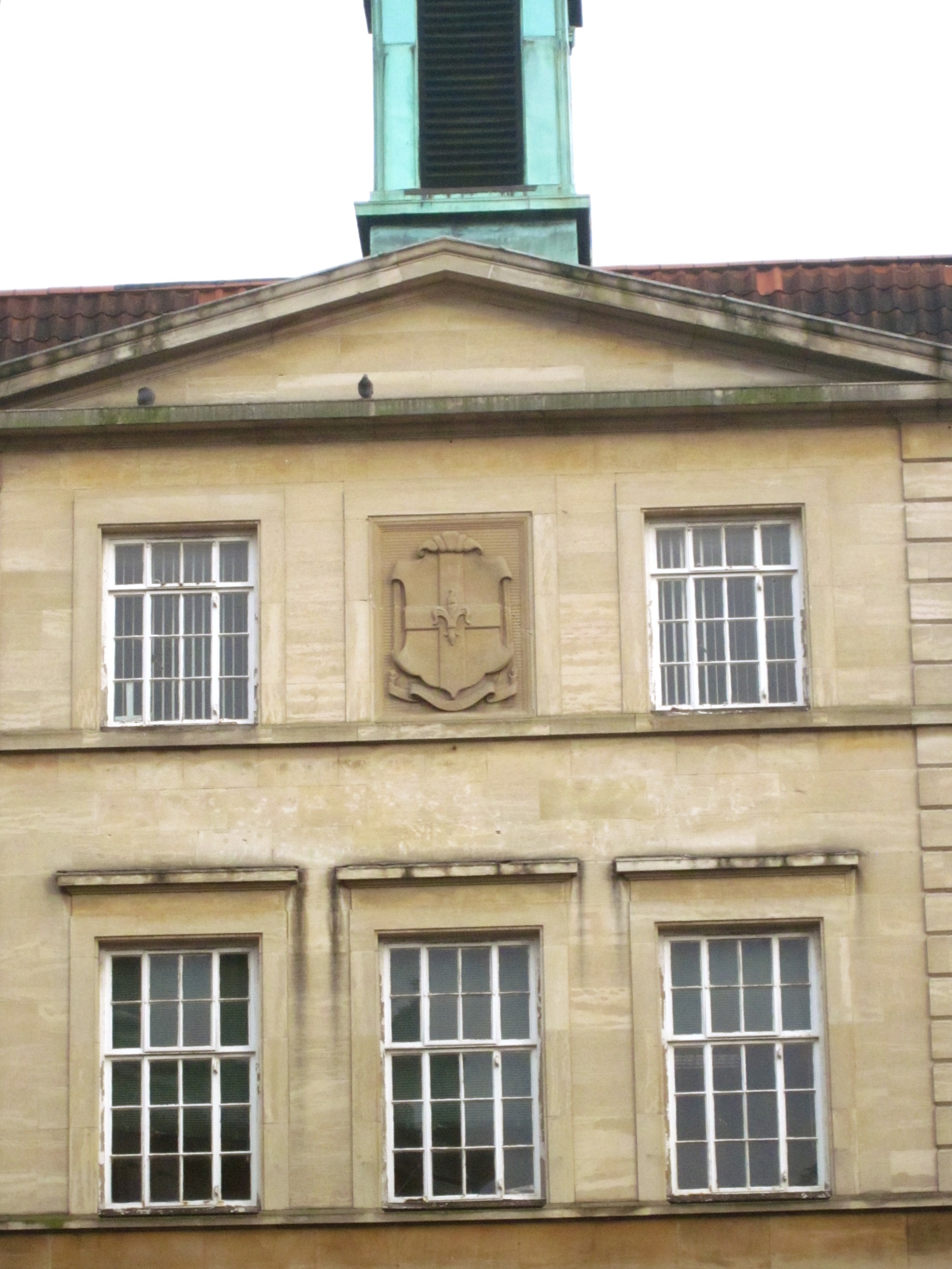
Classical corner facade of former Norwich Union Building

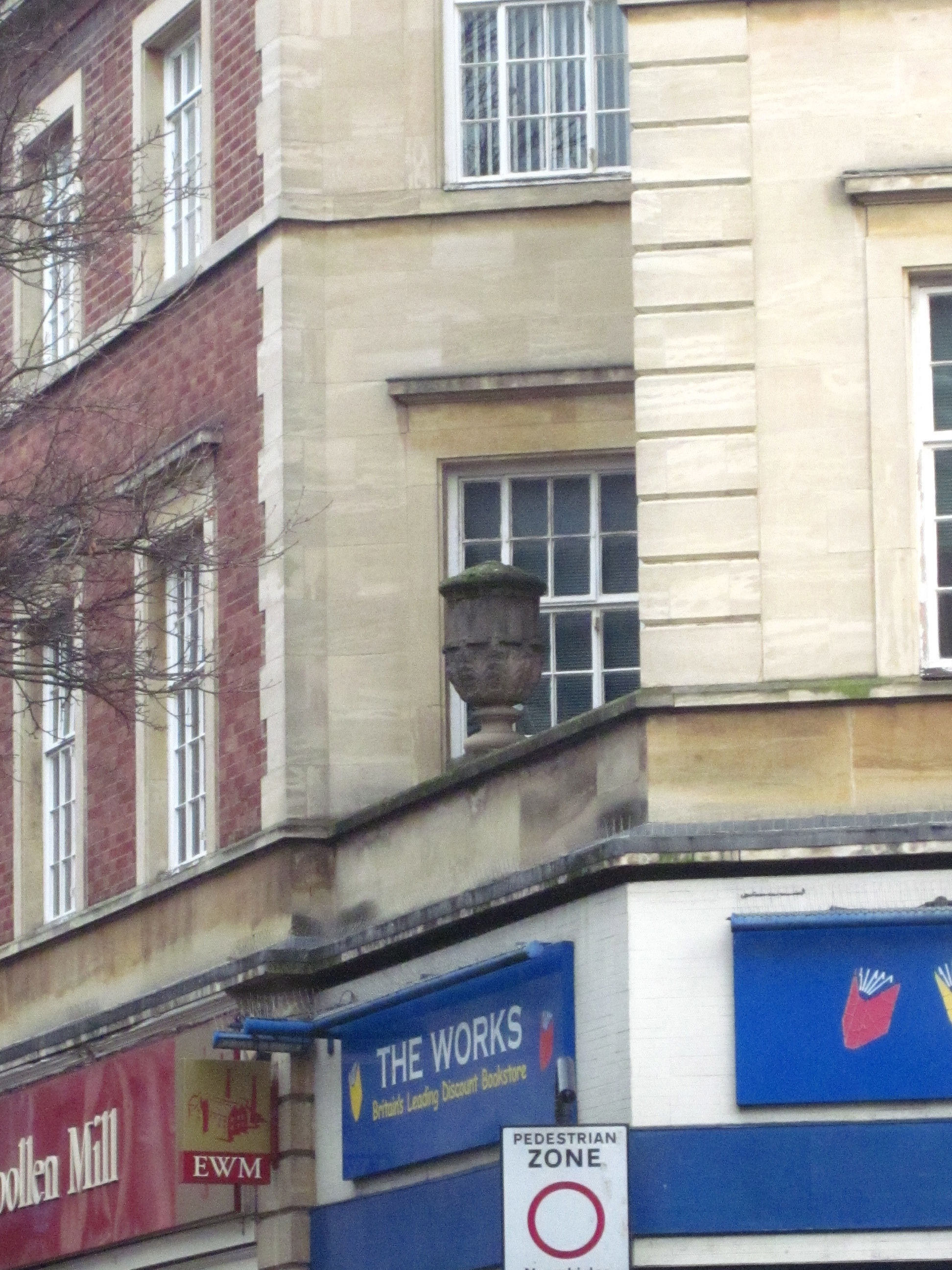
Urn from St Peter's on a ledge of the Norwich Union Building.

== See also ==
- Churches in Lincoln

== Literature ==
- Antram N (revised), Pevsner N & Harris J, (1989), The Buildings of England: Lincolnshire, Yale University Press.
- Colvin H. A. (1995), Biographical Dictionary of British Architects 1600–1840. Yale University Press, 3rd edition London, pg.885–6.
- Gomme A. (2000), Smith of Warwick. Francis Smith, Architect and Master-Builder ISBN 1900289385
