= Vincenzo Damini =

Italian painter

Vincenzo Damini (before 1700 – c.1749) was an Italian artist, a pupil of Giovanni Antonio Pellegrini, who spent some time in England.

== Life ==
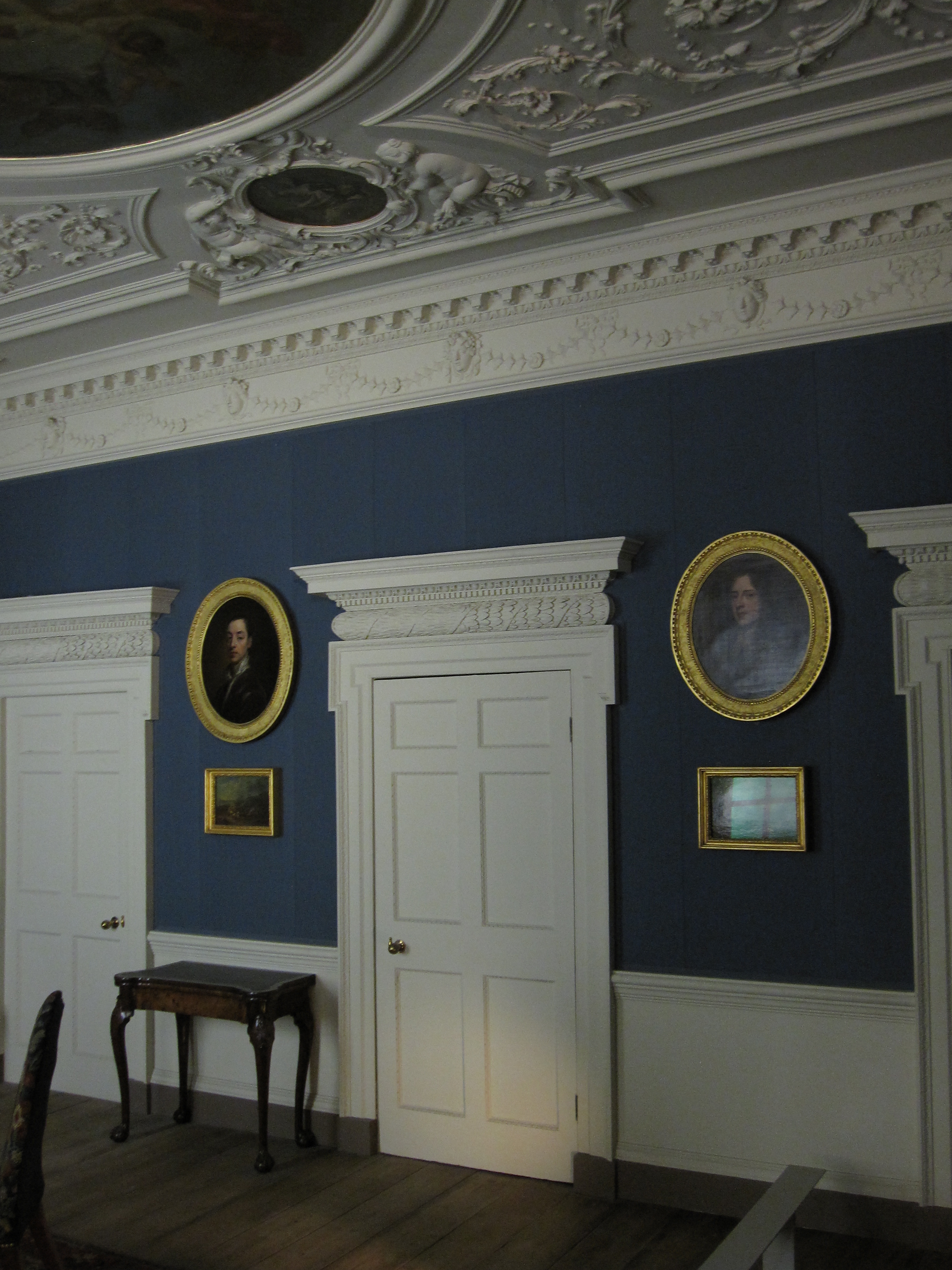
The parlour from 2 Henrietta Street, London, the main panels have been attributed to Vincenzo Damini, Victoria and Albert Museum

Damini was born in Venice towards the end of the 17th century. He was a pupil of Giovanni Antonio Pellegrini, whom he accompanied to England in about 1720. His portrait of the London scenery painter John Devoto is known from a mezzotint after it, made by John Faber. In the north transept of Lincoln Cathedral, he executed a wall painting of four bishops beneath Gothic canopies, replacing an older version of the same subject; his assistant while working on it was the English artist Giles Hussey. Also in Lincoln, he painted a fresco of the Ascension in the chancel and apse of the church of St Peter-at-Arches. The church was demolished in the 1930s, but Damini's oil modello for the work survives.

Five decorative paintings inset into the plaster ceiling of a room designed by James Gibbs for a house in Henrietta Street, London, are attributed to Damini. The entire room, dating from around 1727-32 is preserved in the Victoria and Albert Museum.

He returned to Italy in 1730, accompanied by Giles Hussey, whom, according to Edward Edwards he abandoned in Bologna, making off with his belongings. By 1737 he was in L'Aquila, in Abruzzo, where, in that year, he painted an altarpiece at the church of the monastery of San Giuliano. There are three works by him in the collection of the Museo Nazionale d'Abruzzo: Il battesimo di Gesù (1740), San Tommaso d'Aquino incatena l'eresia (1739) and Carlo d'Angiò ai piedi della Vergine e San Tommaso d'Aquino (1741).

He died in L'Aquila in about 1749.
