= Byre Theatre =

Theatre in St Andrews, Fife, Scotland

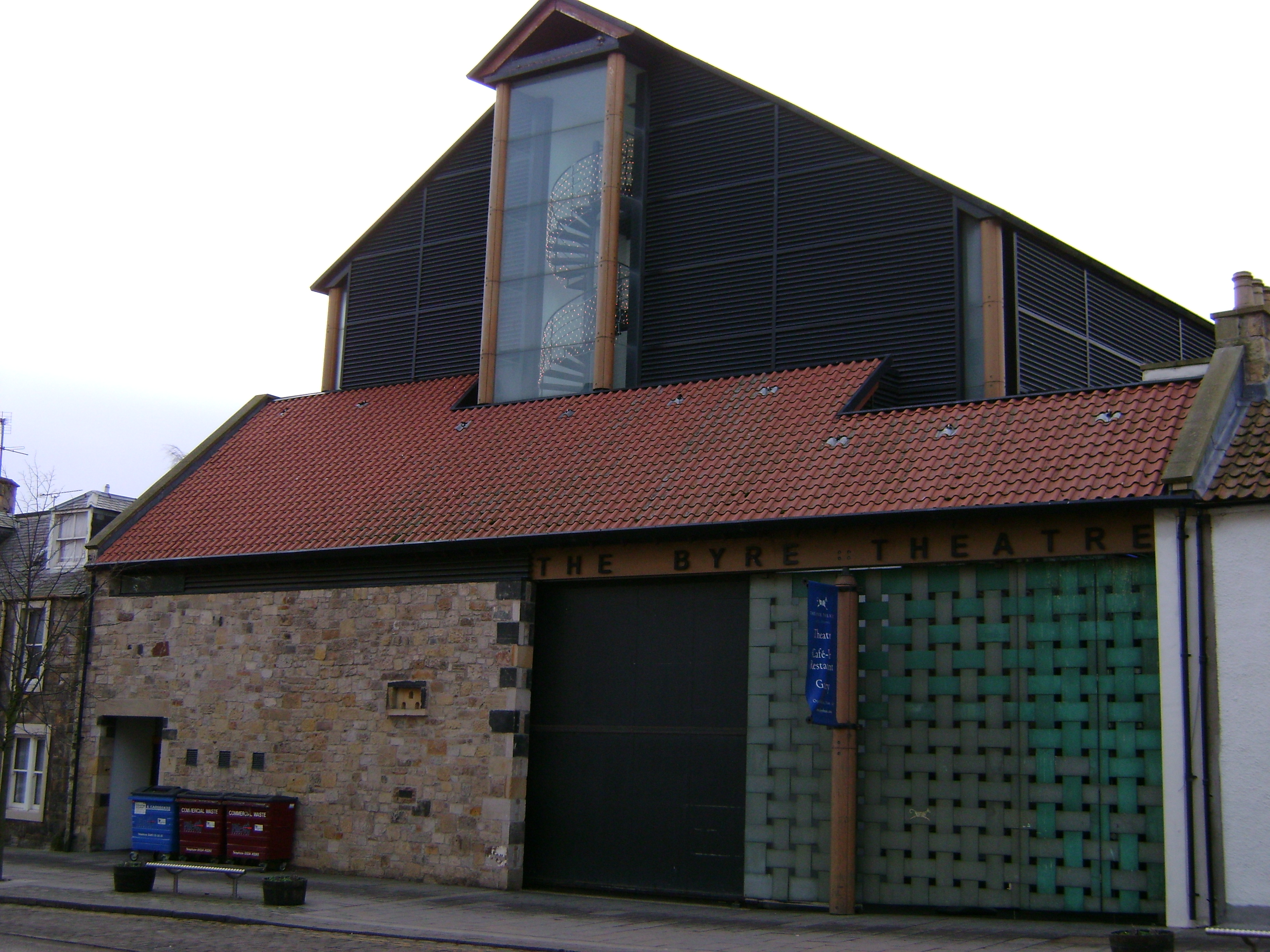
- The back of the Byre Theatre
- Interactive map of Byre Theatre
- Address: Abbey Street; St Andrews, Fife; Scotland
- Owner: Fife Council
- Capacity: Main auditorium 216; Lawrence Levy 40-80

Construction
- Opened: 1933
- Rebuilt: 2001, Nicoll Russell Studios

Website
- www.byretheatre.com

The Byre Theatre is a theatre in St Andrews, Fife, Scotland. It was founded in 1933 by Charles Marford, an actor (found in the Who's Who of 1921) and Alexander B. Paterson, a local journalist and playwright, with help from a theatre group made up from members of Hope Park Church, St Andrews.

Today's Byre Theatre was built by award-winning architects Nicoll Russell Studios of Broughty Ferry, Dundee. The theatre grew from Charles Marford and A.B. Paterson's aspirations for a truly modern theatre addressing the needs of the entire community. The current building was opened in 2001 by Sir Sean Connery. Its main auditorium is named after A.B. Paterson. There is also a second 80-seat performance space named after the late golf photographer, Lawrence Levy. The theatre is said to be haunted by the benevolent ghost of Charles Marford, one of its founders.

== History ==
The Byre Theatre's first home was a disused cow byre which the group cleaned out and ran as the St. Andrews Play Club, giving performances to audiences who sat on cushions on the floor. The first performance was Murder Trial by Sydney Box in 1935. Within a couple of years, the Byre Theatre had established a considerable reputation running a programme of performances which attracted audiences the theatre was barely able to hold.

In 1969, the original building was demolished to make way for a new housing development, and in 1970 the second building was opened. At a cost of £40,000, funded by a public appeal and the local authority, it was modeled on the Mermaid Theatre in London. The facilities were modest, for both public and staff, but it was thought to be rather grand compared to its predecessor. In 1994, Ken Alexander became Artistic Director.

A.B. Paterson's last ambition was yet again to modernise and refurbish the Byre Theatre to meet current expectations and requirements, in particular to address the inadequate facilities for those with special access needs, including visual or audio impairment. At the time of his death in 1989, a proposal for expansion of the theatre's facilities had been initiated. The £5.5m expansion was completed in 2001, and the theatre opened with a production of Into The Woods by Stephen Sondheim.

Ken Alexander was replaced as Artistic Director by Stephen Wrentmore in 2004. A cut in funding in 2006 meant that the Byre had to abandon producing its own plays, and subsequently provided a venue for visiting productions and community activities. Jacqueline McKay became Chief Executive in March 2007.

In January 2013, the theatre went into administration and ceased hosting performances despite a sustained campaign by "Save the Byre Theatre" activists, endorsed by figures like Sean Connery.

The University of St Andrews announced in August 2014 that the theatre was to reopen under the management of the University, after striking a deal with owners Fife Council and Creative Scotland. Under the agreement, which takes the form of a 25-year lease, the Byre will be used as a theatre, educational resource, general arts venue and music centre. When the announcement was made, the University stressed that the "rescue package will be delivered at no cost to council tax payers in Fife who hitherto had subsidised the ailing theatre". Michael Downes, the University of St Andrews’ Director of Music, was appointed as Artistic Director in September 2014, and replaced by Liam Sinclair in 2016.
