= Halecombe =

Limestone quarry in Somerset, England

Coordinates: 51.22498°N 2.43528°W

Halecombe is a limestone quarry near Leigh-on-Mendip on the Mendip Hills, Somerset, England.

The quarry exhibits pale to dark grey well-bedded Carboniferous Limestone, about 350-320 million years old, dipping steeply and consistently northwards and numerous "fist-sized" calcite inclusions within the limestones both solid and hollow with internal calcite crystal growth. There are abundant near-vertical fissures and joints in the limestone with varying amounts of calcite mineralization and tufa growth around groundwater seepages. There are abundant shelly fossils and corals.

Quarrying activity was initiated at Halecombe at the time of the Second World War. It had been worked under private ownership until purchased by Hobbs in the 1960s; subsequently worked by Wimpey Hobbs following their amalgamation in the early 1980s and by Tarmac Ltd from 1996. It is now owned by Anglo American.

The landscape provides several areas identified under the UK Biodiversity Action Plan including Lowland Meadow, Limestone Grassland and Species-rich Neutral Grassland. The site is subject to its own Biodiversity Action Plan. Pans submitted in December 2011 provide for the provision of a water balancing lake.

== See also ==
- Quarries of the Mendip Hills
