= Abba Mari ben Isaac of Saint-Gilles =

French judge

Abba Mari ben Isaac of Saint-Gilles was a prominent French Jewish official who flourished about the middle of the twelfth century, and lived at Saint-Gilles, near Lunel, in Languedoc.

According to Benjamin of Tudela, who visited the Jewish community of that place, Abba Mari held the office of bailli (magistrate) about 1165, having been appointed by Raymond V, who was friendly to the Jews. The monarch made St. Gilles the second capital of his country. That a Jew was in those times chosen to so high an office is a fact of some importance, as it goes far to show the position which the Jews occupied in southern France previous to the war with the Albigenses. The war lasted until 1229. Some scholars pretend to see in this Abba Mari the father of Isaac ben Abba Mari, the author of the 'Iṭṭur. In this work Isaac refers to his father as a prominent Talmudist, from which circumstance it is inferred that the subject of this sketch was not only a high official but also a Talmudic scholar—a deduction which has been completely set aside by Gross.
