= Ägidienkirche, Speyer =

Coordinates: 49°18′59″N 8°25′46″E

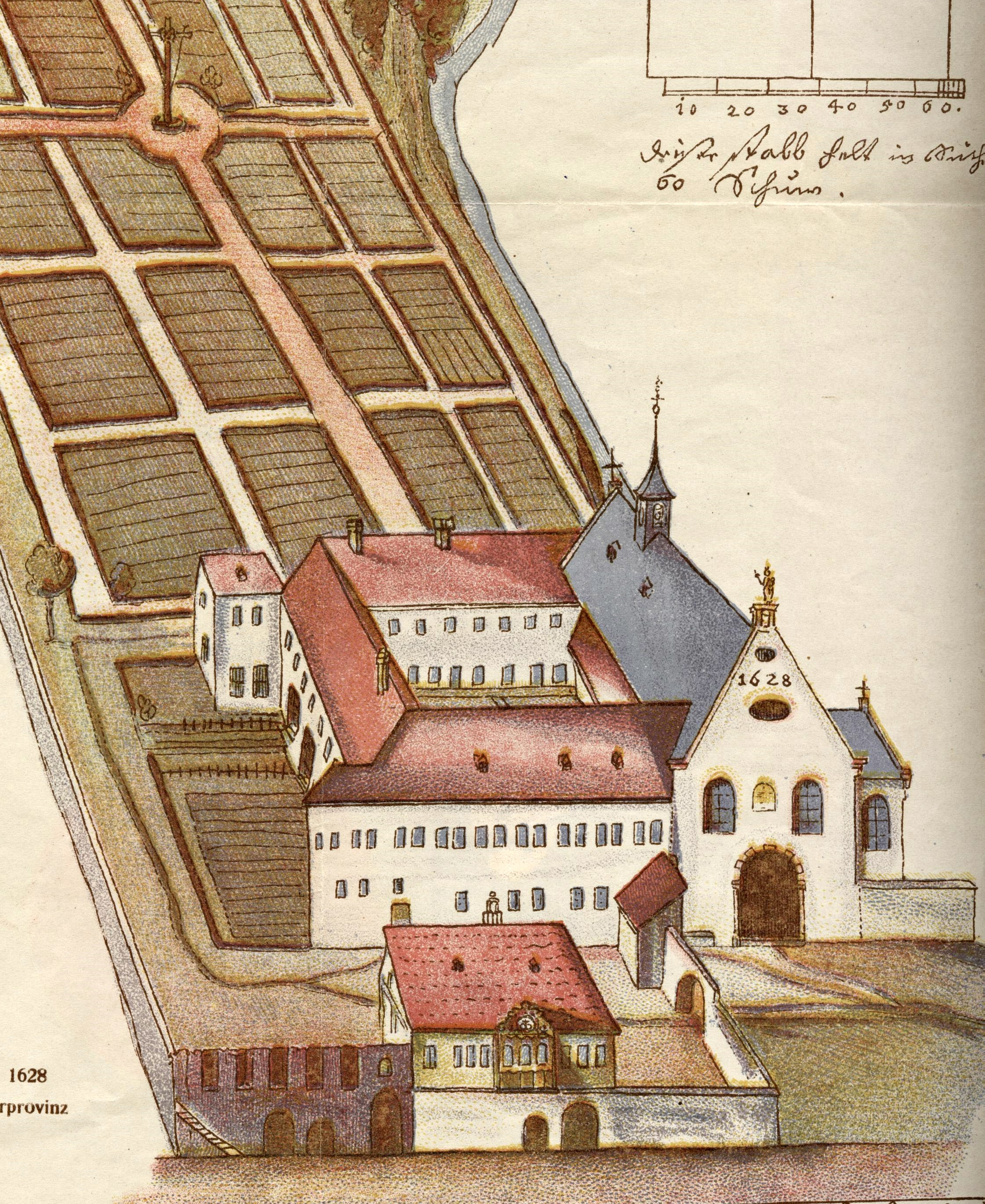
The 17th century Aegidienkirche and the Capuchin monastery in 1628.

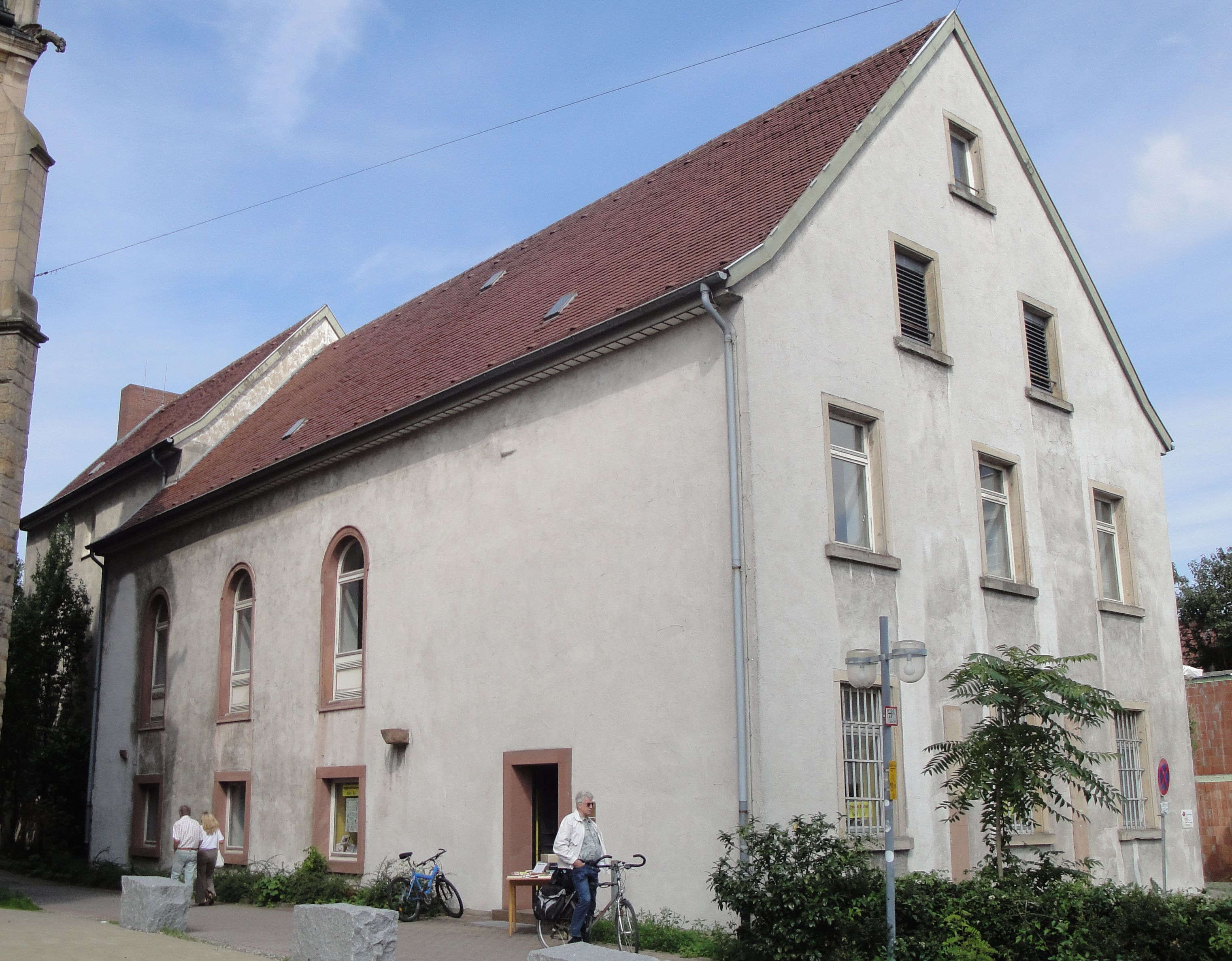
The 17th century Aegidienkirche, now deconsecrated and rebuilt.

The Ägidienkirche was a church in the German city of Speyer. Dedicated to saint Giles, it was founded around 1140 as part of a hospital complex by bishop Burchard on land owned by himself and his mother in what was then the city outskirts. In 1148, after his mother's death, he granted it to the Augustinian canonry at Hördt. It soon became one of Speyer's parish churches, with clergy supplied or appointed by the canonry.

Its last Roman Catholic priest, Jost Neblich, was presented in 1565. The Protestant Frederick III, Elector Palatine took control of the canonry in 1566, forcibly expelled the canons from the Ägidienkirche and in spring 1572 installed its first Protestant pastor, Johann Willing. Leopold V's troops occupied Speyer during the Thirty Years War and he handed the church over to a new Capuchin foundation in the city on 1 May 1623. It was in such a poor state that they laid the foundation stone for a new hall church, designed by the Capuchin brother Peter of Cologne, completed in 1628 and costing Leopold 10,000 florins. The bishop of Speyer ordered that the new church's main altar retain the dedication to St Giles. New monastic buildings and hospitals were also built on the old site.

The Capuchins were expelled in 1650 following the Peace of Westphalia and a priest was even dragged from the altar during mass. The new church became a Protestant parish church, although the monastery was given back to the Capuchins in 1688 when the French took control of the areas during the Nine Years War, although it was damaged when the French burned the city the following year. Monks had returned by 1694 and the order's minister general visited early in 1766. It refused the Civil Constitution of the Clergy after the French occupied the city in the War of the First Coalition but returned to the monastery in 1796. The Treaty of Campo Formio in 1797 formally annexed Speyer to France and the following year the monastery was declared state property and the church made the city's main parish church, since it was planned to demolish the city's ruined cathedral. Instead the cathedral was saved and the monastery sold off in 1806, though the deconsecrated church (by then a tobacco store) was acquired by the Kingdom of Bavaria in 1807 for use as a customs warehouse. In 1979 it was turned into a community centre named the Ägidienhaus.

== Sources ==
- Jakob Baumann: Geschichte der St. Ägidienkirche und des Kapuzinerkonventes in der freien Reichsstadt Speier, Speyer, 1918, Jägerscher Verlag
