= St Giles' Church, Lincoln =

The Church of St Giles, Lincoln
- St Giles Church, Lincoln
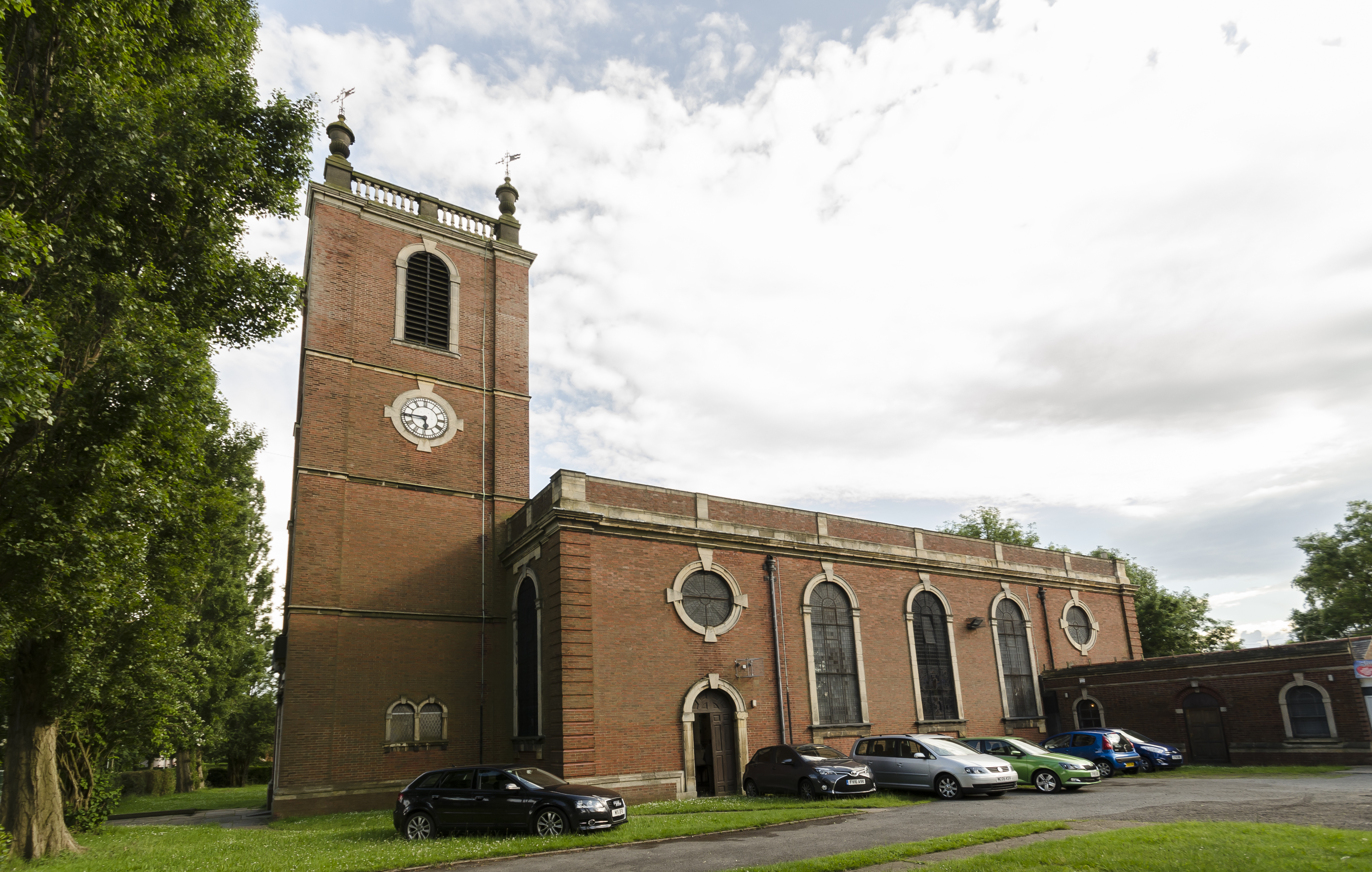
- St Giles Church, Lincoln
- The Church of St Giles, Lincoln
- 53.24344°N 0.51971°W
- OS grid reference: SK 98875 72842
- Country: England
- Denomination: Church of England
- Churchmanship: Central

History
- Status: Active
- Dedication: St Giles

Architecture
- Functional status: Parish church
- Heritage designation: Grade II listed
- Designated: 8 October 1953
- Completed: 1936

Administration
- Diocese: Diocese of Lincoln
- Parish: Lincoln

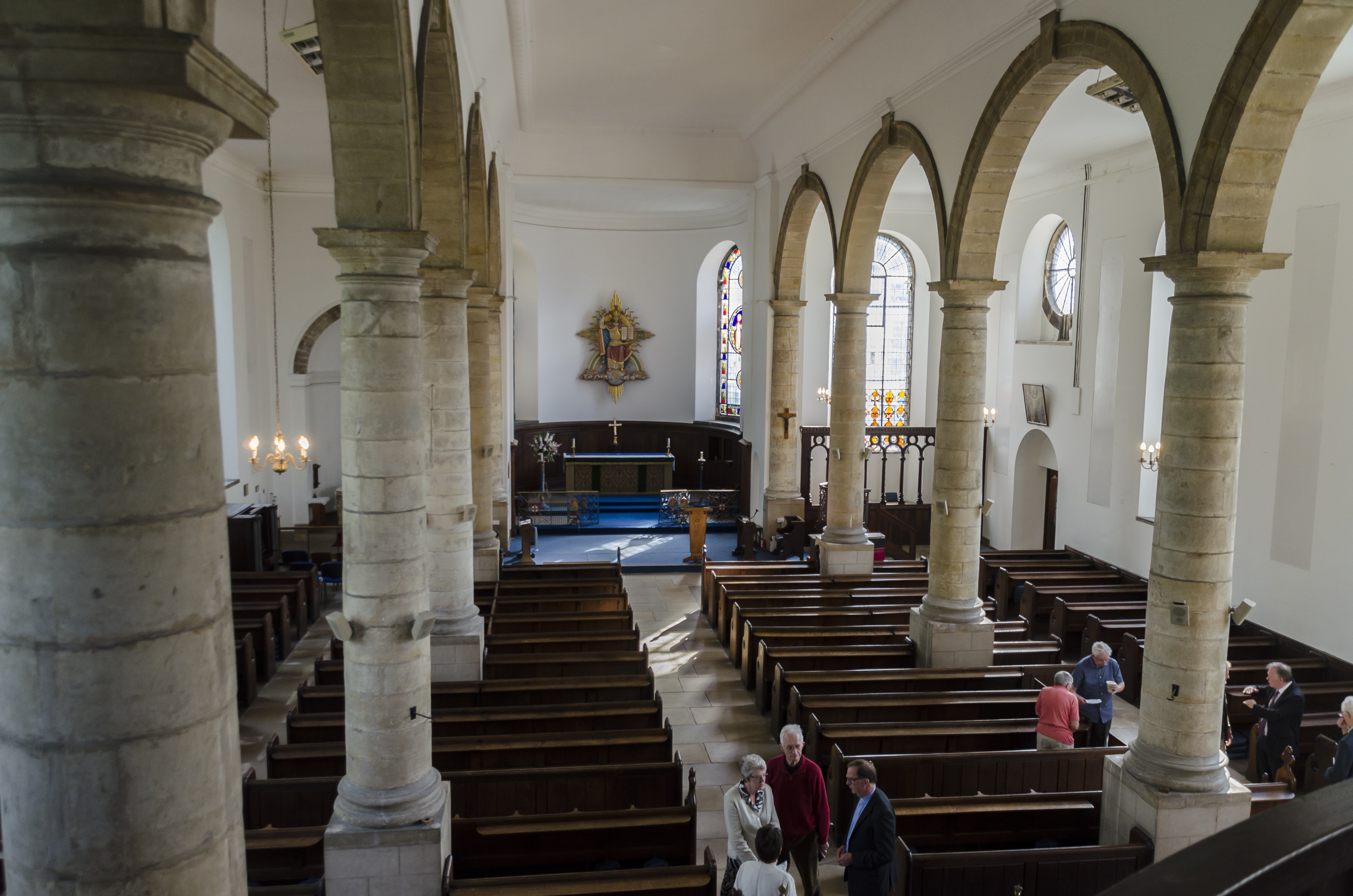
Interior

St Giles Church, Lincoln is a Grade II listed parish church in St Giles, a suburb of Lincoln in Lincolnshire, England. It was built in 1936 by William Watkins, on a similar plan to the demolished 18th-century St Peter at Arches Church, and reusing some of its materials. It is in a classical style, in brick with stone dressings, with a tower. On the interior, the font, altar rail, organ and organ-gallery stairs all date from the 18th century.

== History ==
The parish was originally served by St Peter at Arches Church, designed by Smith of Warwick in the 18th century. This was demolished in 1930 and a replacement was built on a different site by William Watkins in 1936, using a similar plan to St Peter's but enlarged. Watkins re-used much of the material from St Peter's, giving rise to the new church's nickname, "the church that moved". St Giles was given a Grade II listing in 1953.

== Description ==
The church is classical in style. The building material is 20th-century brick, with stone dressings, many from the original church, and copper roofs, also 18th century. The building has rusticated quoins in brick. The principal windows have arched tops with keystones and there are also several circular windows. The entrances to the main building have arched tops and keystones. The tower has an entrance on the east side, which is topped with a cornice and flanked by pilasters. The tower also has string courses, a clock and louvred apertures for the bells, and is surmounted by a cornice, topped with a balustrade with finials in the shape of urns.

The interior has stone piers and arches with keystones. Some of the internal doors house pieces of 12th-century stonework. There is a wooden organ gallery across the east end, accessed by paired 18th-century stairs; the organ is 18th century. The west end of the north aisle has a 19th-century wooden screen. The alabaster font is 18th century. The wrought-iron altar rail also dates from the 18th century, and there is a 19th-century wrought-iron pulpit. There is some 19th-century stained glass.

== Modern church ==
The church remains an active place of worship for the local area. It also undertakes outreach work in the wider community, which is among the most deprived neighbourhoods in the city, including regular sessions in a local supermarket, and the operation of a food bank. In 2014 the churchyard saw the completion of a two-year long restoration project undertaken by local young offenders through a restorative justice scheme operated by Lincolnshire County Council and Lincolnshire Police.

== Sources ==
- Pevsner, Nikolaus; Harris, John; Antram, Nicholas (2002). Lincolnshire. The Buildings of England. New Haven, US and London: Yale University Press. ISBN 9780300096200. OCLC 49298889.
