= Saint-Gilles, Gard =

Saint-Gilles
- Commune
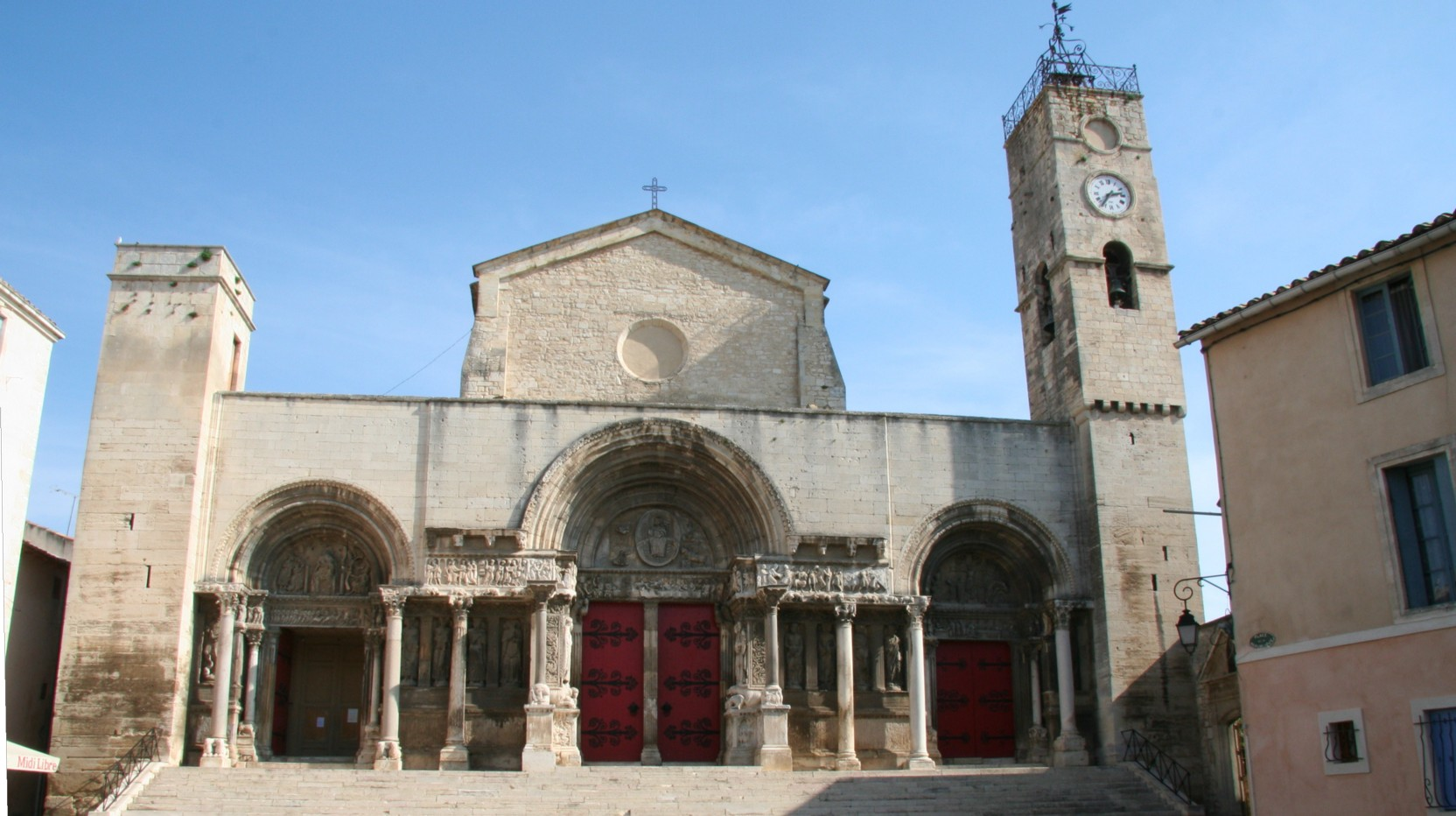
- West portal of the abbey church

- Coat of arms
- Location of Saint-Gilles
- Location within France Location within Occitanie
- Coordinates: 43°40′43″N 4°25′54″E
- Country: France
- Region: Occitania
- Department: Gard
- Arrondissement: Nîmes
- Canton: Saint-Gilles
- Intercommunality: CA Nîmes Métropole

Government
  - Mayor (2020–2026): Eddy Valadier
- Area^{1}: 153.73 km^{2} (59.36 sq mi)
- Elevation: 7 m (23 ft)
- Highest elevation: 116 m (381 ft)
- Lowest elevation: 0 m (0 ft)
- Population (2023): 14,734
  - Density: 95.843/km^{2} (248.23/sq mi)
- Time zone: UTC+01:00 (CET)
  - Summer (DST): UTC+02:00 (CEST)
- INSEE/Postal code: 30258 /30800
- ^{1} French Land Register data, which excludes lakes, ponds, glaciers > 1 km^{2} (0.386 sq mi or 247 acres) and river estuaries.

Saint-Gilles (French pronunciation: [sɛ̃ ʒil]; Occitan: Sant Geli or Sent Geli; lit. 'Saint Giles'), also known as Saint-Gilles-du-Gard (Occitan: Sant Geli de Gard or Sent Geli de Gard), is a commune in the French department of Gard, and the administrative region of Occitania, southern France.

It is the second most populous commune in the Nîmes metropolitan area.

== History ==
The abbey of Saint-Gilles was founded during the seventh century traditionally by the hermit Saint Giles (Latin Ægidius), whose relics the abbey possessed. The commune formed around the nucleus of the abbey, which was the first stopping point for pilgrims bound for Santiago de Compostela in Spain, who were following the via Tolosana that led from Arles to Toulouse and crossed the Pyrenees to join other routes at Puente La Reina, thence to Santiago along the Via Compostelana. The former abbey church was listed in 1998 among the UNESCO World Heritage Sites, as part of the Routes of Santiago de Compostela in France. The abbey church's west portal is among the most beautiful of the great Romanesque portals and a definitive example of the Provençal Romanesque. The church has three naves and a famed spiral staircase of cantilevered stone steps (in the now destroyed part of the church). During the French Wars of Religion the Protestants fortified themselves within the abbey, which was severely damaged.

The shrine of Saint Gilles, located in the crypt of the church, is the subject of pilgrimage in particular by women wishing to become pregnant or dealing with infertility.

Saint-Gilles was the birthplace of Guy Foulques, Pope Clement IV (died 1268), whose natal house is now a museum of the archaeology, ethnology and ornithology of the Camargue.

Saint-Gilles is more recently the birthplace of the author Georges-Jean Arnaud (born 1928).

== Geography ==
Saint-Gilles is located at the northern edge of the Petite Camargue, between Arles (15 km) and Nîmes (16 km). With a land area of 153.73 km^{2} (59.355 sq mi), it is rather large by continental French standards, although many of the communes in this part of France are among the largest in area in Metropolitan France.

== Population ==
Historical population

Year	Pop.	±% p.a.
1793	5,000	—
1800	5,047	+0.13%
1806	5,212	+0.54%
1821	5,600	+0.48%
1831	5,561	−0.07%
1836	5,797	+0.83%
1841	5,635	−0.57%
1846	5,832	+0.69%
1851	5,985	+0.52%
1856	6,132	+0.49%
1861	6,365	+0.75%
1866	6,804	+1.34%
1872	6,211	−1.51%
1876	6,302	+0.36%
1881	5,268	−3.52%
1886	5,503	+0.88%
1891	5,947	+1.56%
1896	6,110	+0.54%
1901	6,381	+0.87%

Year	Pop.	±% p.a.
1906	6,300	−0.26%
1911	6,258	−0.13%
1921	5,924	−0.55%
1926	5,613	−1.07%
1931	5,833	+0.77%
1936	5,325	−1.81%
1946	5,335	+0.02%
1954	5,789	+1.03%
1962	6,721	+1.88%
1968	8,742	+4.48%
1975	8,679	−0.10%
1982	9,887	+1.88%
1990	11,304	+1.69%
1999	11,626	+0.31%
2007	13,211	+1.61%
2012	13,646	+0.65%
2017	13,607	−0.06%
2023	14,734	+1.34%

Source: EHESS and INSEE (1968–2023)

== Transportation ==
The Nîmes-Alès-Camargue-Cévennes Airport, sometimes called Garons Airport, is located on the territory of the commune.

== Notable people ==
- Abba Mari ben Isaac of St Gilles

== See also ==
- Communes of the Gard department
- Costières de Nîmes AOC
