= Abbey of Saint-Gilles =

Abbey in Gard, France

Coordinates: 43°40′43″N 4°25′54″E

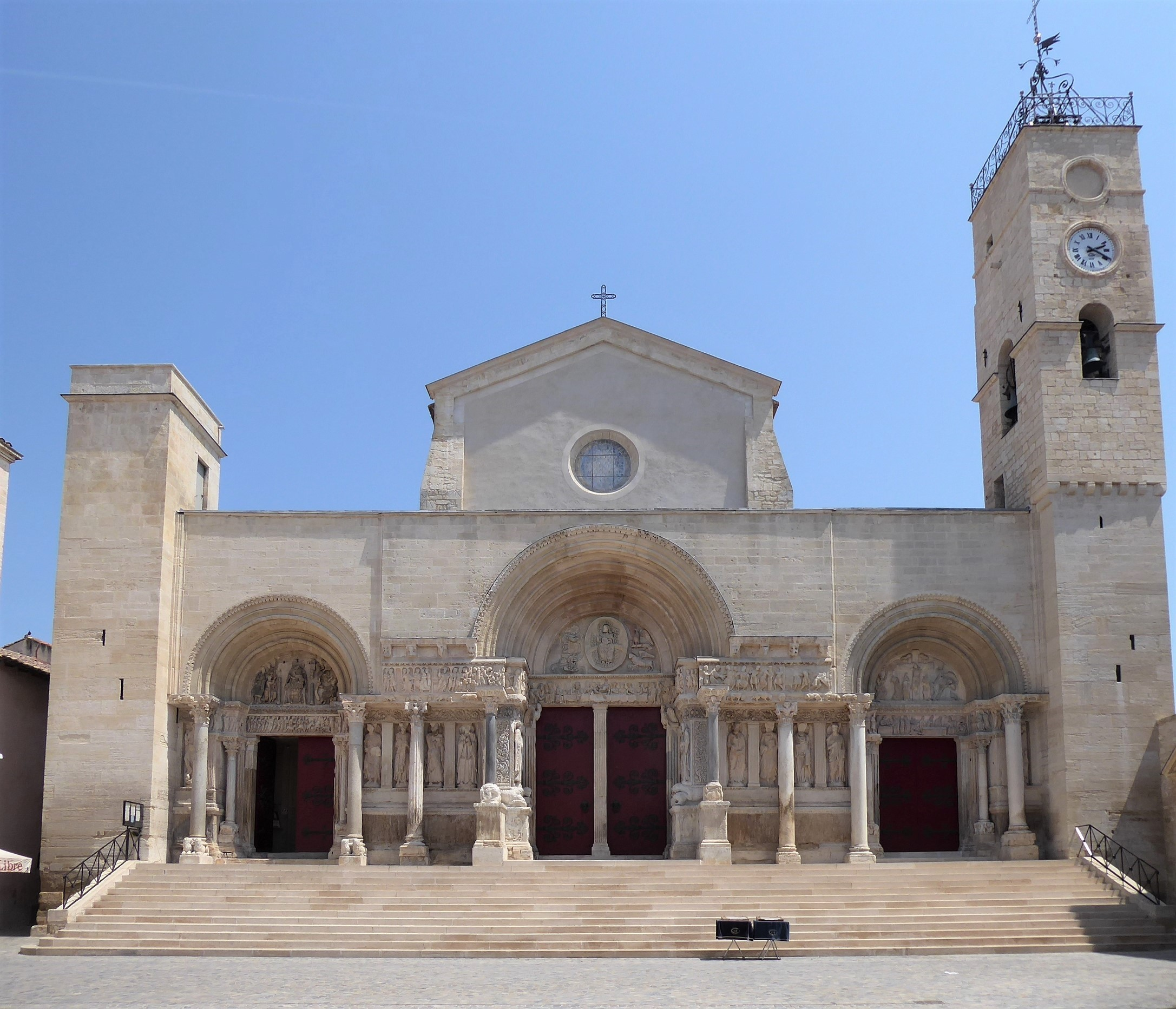
Entrance portico.

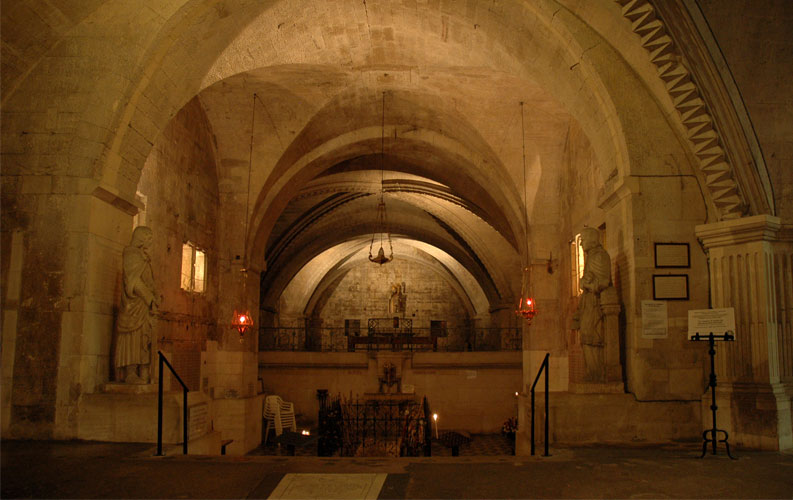
View of the crypt.

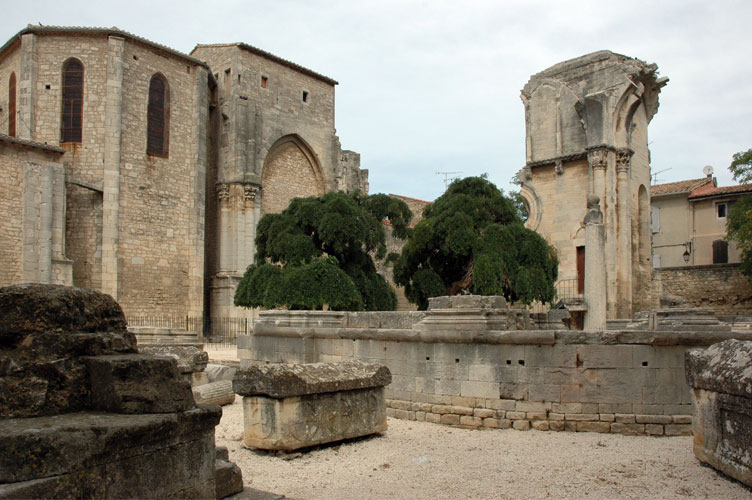
The massive ruins of the former choir area.

The Abbey of Saint-Gilles (French: Abbaye de Saint-Gilles ) is a monastery in Saint-Gilles, southern France. Founded by Saint Giles, it is included in the UNESCO Heritage List, as part of the World Heritage Sites of the Routes of Santiago de Compostela in France.

== History ==
According to the legend, it was founded in the 7th century by Saint Gilles, over lands which had been given him by the Visigoth King Wamba after he had involuntarily wounded the saint during a hunt. The monastery was initially dedicated to St. Peter and St. Paul but, in the 9th century, the dedication was changed to St. Giles himself, who had become one of the most venerated figures in the area. His relics were housed in the abbey church and attracted numerous pilgrims.

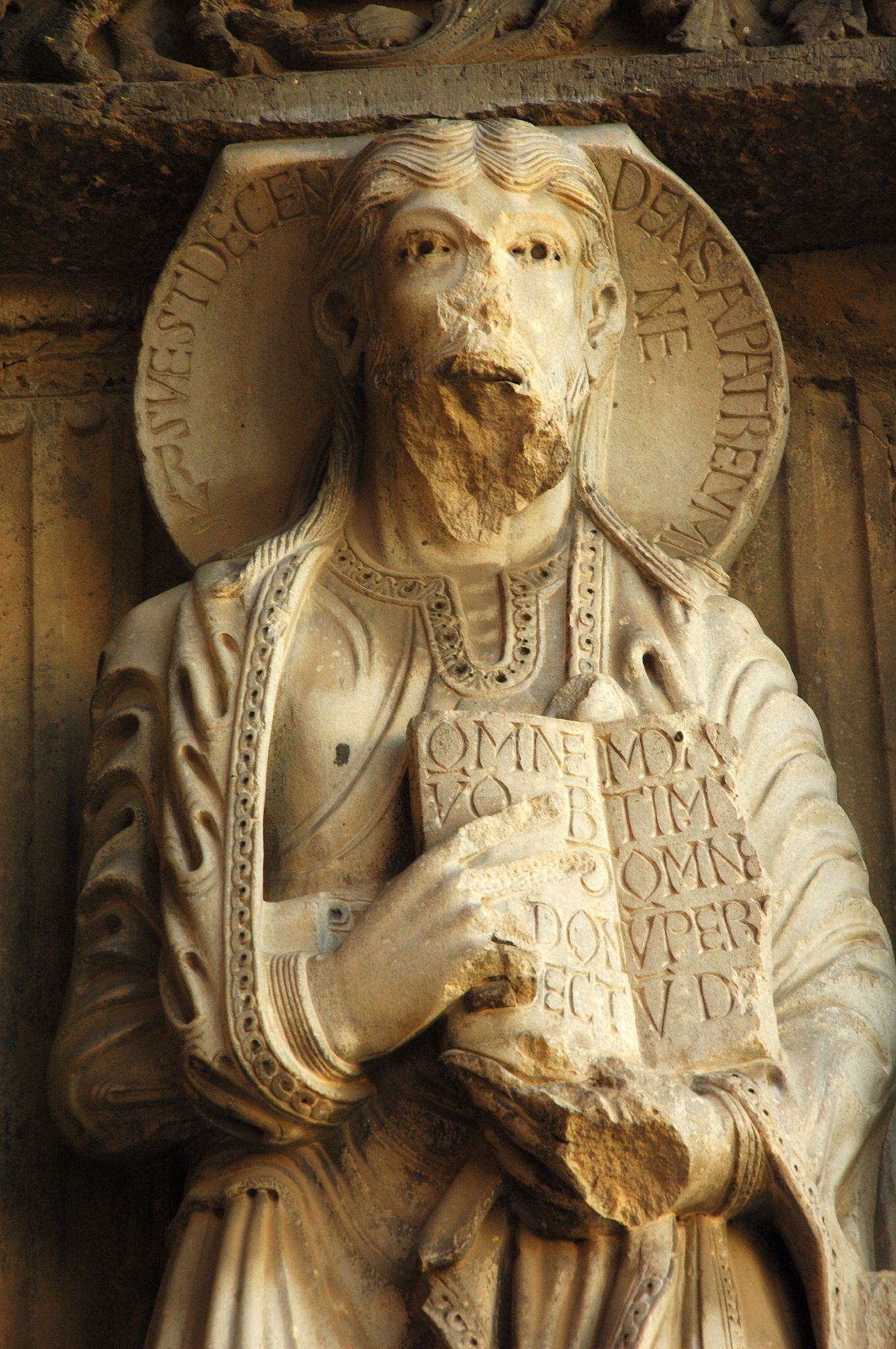
Statue of St. James in the portico.

In the 11th century, the monastery was attached to that of Cluny. Thanks to its prosperity, it was enlarged and decorated from the 12th to the 15th century, when the cloister was finished. In the 16th century the church, in the course of the Wars of Religion, was devastated when the Huguenots took shelter in it. Restorations were held in the 17th century and again, after further damage during the French Revolution, in the 19th century. The tomb of St. Giles was rediscovered in 1865, becoming again a pilgrim destination from 1965.

== Description ==
The abbey church is in typical southern French Romanesque style. The façade, built from 1120 to 1160, has a decorated entrance portico with three portals (the central one larger) with Corinthian columns and medieval sculpture decorations. These include, in the lower sector, a bestiary and scenes from the Old Testament; in the middle one it has statues and characters from the New Testament; the frieze and the tympana above the latter have also scenes from the same book, including the "Adoration of the Magi", the "Crucifixion of Jesus" and a "Maestà".

The frieze scenes are inspired to Roman ones. The upper part of the façade had originally also a classical-inspired decoration, which has now disappeared. The bell tower dates to the 18th century.

The crypt, or lower church, dates to the early 11th century. It measures 50 by 25 meters, and occupies the whole subterranean section of the nave. In its center is the tomb of St. Giles, a medieval place of veneration until in the 16th century, his relics were moved to the Basilica of Saint Sernin at Toulouse. The upper church, with a nave and two apses, mostly belongs to the 17th-century reconstruction, aside from the massive pillars in Corinthian style.

Behind the apse are the remains of the ancient choir, which once were part of the originally longer church (98 meters instead of the current 50). Inside the northern wall of the ancient choir is a spiral staircase (now free standing) known as "Screw of St. Gilles", dating to the 12th century, made of cantilevered stone steps.

== Casts ==
A plaster cast of the façade exists in the Hall of Architecture at the Carnegie Museum in Pittsburgh, Pennsylvania.

== Sources ==
- Saint-Jean, Robert (1975). Languedoc roman.
- Marconot, Jean-Marie (2008). Saint Gilles. L'abbatiale romane. Nîmes: Riresc. ISBN 2-910539-37-7.
