= Stephen Wrentmore =

British theatre director

Stephen Wrentmore is a British theatre director, writer, educator, and strategist currently working in the United States.

== Career ==
Wrentmore is currently a lecturer at the University of Kentucky’s College of Fine Arts, Department of Theatre & Dance. He previously worked as Artistic Producer at Poole's Centre for the Arts (UK) and as Associate Artistic Director at Arizona Theatre Company, where he founded the new play development series, featuring workshop performances with writers such as Larissa FastHorse, Caridad Svich, Kristiana Colón, Lauren Yee, and Brian Dykstra. Wrentmore was also Artistic Director of The Byre Theatre in St Andrews, Scotland, and worked with Trevor Nunn and John Caird at the Royal National Theatre in London and as Associate Director on the world tour of Hamlet, featuring Simon Russell Beale in the title role.

Wrentmore's directing work has been showcased internationally and throughout the United States, including productions in New York, California, Arizona, Minneapolis, Boston, London, Edinburgh, Dublin, Berlin, Copenhagen, Paris, Moscow, Omsk, Kosovo, Latvia, Cyprus, Kazakhstan and Serbia. His writing has been published by Theatre Communications Group and featured in contemporary adaptations of the works of William Shakespeare, including productions in Arizona, Oklahoma, and Kentucky, and his work as a curator includes an exhibition and publications by artist Ineke Van der Val and Denise Webber. As an educator, he also developed the MyShakespeare learning program, focused on forging connections between Shakespearean themes and the modern world, and worked as a learning consultant for Tate Gallery.

== Personal life ==
Wrentmore grew up in north and west London. He studied at the University of Cambridge and the Royal Central School of Drama at the University of London, and is a Fellow of the Clore Leadership Programme.
