= Giles Hussey (painter) =

English painter (1710–1788)

Giles Hussey (1710–1788) was a painter from Dorset, England. His portraits are well regarded, but his theories on art never received the attention he craved. He believed that each note of music represented a colour. He created the first portrait of Charles Edward Stuart, the pretender to the British throne. Hussey has works in the Tate Gallery.

== Life ==
Hussey was born in 1710 at Marnhull in Dorset, the tenth of thirteen children of John and Mary Hussey. His parents sent him to receive a Catholic education in Douay and St Omer in France. On his return he was apprenticed to Jonathan Richardson to learn the art of portraiture. He then went on to work with Francesco Riari and he assisted in painting bishops in Lincoln Cathedral under the Venetian artist Vincenzo Damini. Damini is credited with saving Hussey from a potentially fatal fall while completing the paintings within porches at the cathedral, and got his reward when the two of them set out for Italy with monies from Hussey's parents.

After journeying through France in 1730, where substantial funds were spent, Damini abandoned Hussey in Bologna after taking his property. Hussey was lucky to be adopted by a former ambassador to London, Signor Ghislonzoni, who befriended the painter, who was in Bolgna until 1733, when he left for his original destination of Rome.

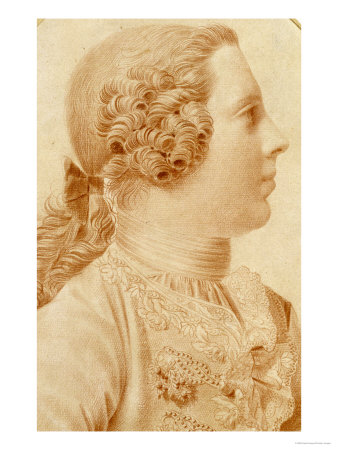
Charles Edward Stuart – The Young Pretender by Hussey

In Rome he started to develop his own theories on art whilst working with Ercole Lelli. His intention was to use his knowledge of mathematics to identify what made artistic beauty. He measured many ancient statues and claimed to have found a "Harmonic Scale" that was important to their beauty and construction. Hussey proposed that the musical notes could be aligned with the colours of the spectrum. Red was meant to indicate "A" whilst violet was meant to indicate A flat.

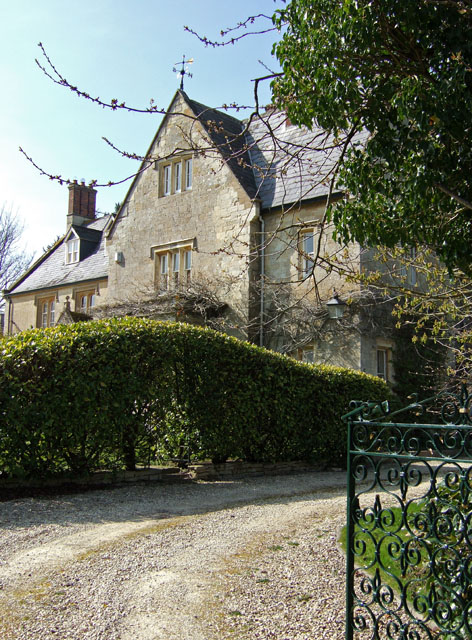
Nash Court in Marnhull where the Hussey family lived until the 1880s

The illustration shows one of the portraits that Hussey made of the "Young Pretender", Charles Edward Stuart, who was the embodiment of the Catholic cause in England. These portraits were accurate, but were considered to have suffered from Hussey's obsession with his theories. Hussey is credited with being the first British artist to create a portrait of Charles Edward Stuart. The first sitting is thought to have been in 1734 and a number of different versions were produced. The second sitting has been dated to 1737 and shows Charles as a knight in a black suit of armour owned by him. An oil painting of this sketch was reported, but its current location is not known.

Hussey went back to England in 1737 to reveal his new theories on art, but they received little attention. To make ends meet he again took to portraiture and was able to include the numismatist Matthew Duane and the Duke of Northumberland amongst his clientele in 1742. The Duke was said to have offered Hussey a room at his house and to also have been willing to fund a servant for him as long as Hussey directed his efforts at the Duke's interest. However Hussey is said to have refused the offer as he was not to be given a Catholic priest as well. Hussey created a third set of drawings of "Bonnie Prince Charlie" in 1742 although he is thought to have based this on a bust of the prince. Over the next twenty years, Hussey was disappointed to find that his artistic theories received very little attention, and in 1768 he gave up painting entirely. He took to gardening after he inherited the family's property at Marnhull, following the death of his elder brother. In 1787 Hussey's nephew, John Rowe of Beaston House in the parish of Broad Hempston, Devon, in whose house Hussey had been living for several years, changed his name to Hussey and inherited Hussey's wealth and property.

Hussey was buried in June 1788 at Broad Hempston in Devon after dying while living away from the artistic community in Beaston House, in the parish of Broad Hempston, the home of his nephew John Rowe. At the end, Hussey's paintings and drawings commanded high prices. His spectacular detail became valued and drawings of the old and young pretender commanded high prices.
