= Leigh-on-Mendip =

Village in Somerset, England

Coordinates: 51.2263°N 2.4374°W

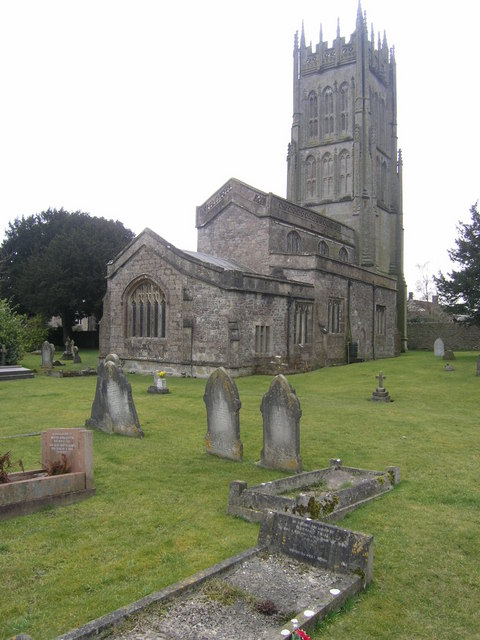
- St Giles church

- Location within Somerset
- Population: 514 (2011)
- OS grid reference: ST695475
- Unitary authority: Somerset Council
- Ceremonial county: Somerset
- Region: South West
- Country: England
- Sovereign state: United Kingdom
- Post town: RADSTOCK
- Postcode district: BA3
- Dialling code: 01373
- Police: Avon and Somerset
- Fire: Devon and Somerset
- Ambulance: South Western
- UK Parliament: Frome and East Somerset

Leigh-on-Mendip or Leigh upon Mendip (on Ordnance Survey maps) is a small village on the Mendip Hills in Somerset, England. It lies roughly equidistant from Frome, Radstock and Shepton Mallet at about 5 miles (8 km) from each town.

The village has several sporting clubs, including cricket, shortmat bowls and table tennis. There is a First School. The village is served by The Bell public house, allotments, a busy Memorial Hall and outdoor play and exercise equipment. Local charity Friends of Leigh Church fundraises for repairs to the Grade I-listed Church of St Giles.

== History ==
Leigh-on-Mendip Memorial Hall (with new roof - 2002)

The name of this village is pronounced lye or lie by local residents rather than lee, and probably comes from the Old English meaning grove or glade.

The estate formed part of the manor and liberty of Mells and was held by Glastonbury Abbey from Saxon times until the dissolution of the monasteries. It then passed to the Horner family. The parish was part of the hundred of Frome.

On 19 June 1643, the village was the site of a skirmish in the English Civil War, between Royalist regiment of Sir James Hamilton and the parliamentary forces under Major Francis Duett.

Some dwellings in Leigh on Mendip parish are close to the Halecombe limestone quarry. The quarry exhibits pale to dark grey well-bedded Carboniferous Limestone. There are abundant near-vertical fissures and joints in the limestone with varying amounts of calcite mineralization and tufa growth around groundwater seepages. Quarrying activity was initiated at the time of the Second World War. It is now owned by Anglo American.

A "History of Leigh on Mendip" was web published in February 2007. In 2007, Leigh on Mendip was chosen as the Calor Somerset Village of the Year.

Leigh on Mendip was home to the television presenter Kevin McCloud, who is known best from the UK television series; Grand Designs.

== Governance ==
The parish council has responsibility for local issues, including setting an annual precept (local rate) to cover the council's operating costs and producing annual accounts for public scrutiny. The parish council evaluates local planning applications and works with the local police, district council officers, and neighbourhood watch groups on matters of crime, security, and traffic. The parish council's role also includes initiating projects for the maintenance and repair of parish facilities, as well as consulting with the district council on the maintenance, repair, and improvement of highways, drainage, footpaths, public transport, and street cleaning. Conservation matters (including trees and listed buildings) and environmental issues are also the responsibility of the council.

For local government purposes, since 1 April 2023, the parish comes under the unitary authority of Somerset Council. Prior to this, it was part of the non-metropolitan district of Mendip (established under the Local Government Act 1972). It was part of Frome Rural District before 1974.

It is also part of the Frome and East Somerset county constituency represented in the House of Commons of the Parliament of the United Kingdom. It elects one Member of Parliament (MP) by the first past the post system of election.

== Religious sites ==
Inside St Giles' Church

The parish Church of St Giles dates from around 1350, and was rebuilt around 1500. It is a Grade I listed building, with an unusual faceless clock.

There used to be a Methodist chapel in the village, however this is now a private house.
