= Léon Péan de Saint-Gilles =

French chemist (1832–1862)

Léon Péan de Saint-Gilles (4 January 1832 – 22 March 1862) was a French chemist who worked along with Marcellin Berthelot on chemical kinetics and equilibria and attempted a mathematical formulation.

Péan de Saint-Gilles was born in a prominent Parisian family, son of notary Amand Péan and Eugénie Jars, and grand-nephew of Louis-Denis Péan de Saint-Gilles. Like most wealthy Parisians of the time he was tutored at home before receiving a degree. He set up his own analytical laboratory with the help of Théophile-Jules Pelouze and began to conduct experiments on his own. His major work was on the use of potassium permanganate as an indicator in titrations involving ester formation with acids and alcohols. In his experiments with Berthelot, he determined that reactions did not reach absolute end compositions but rather reached equilibria which depended on the quantities of reactants. He moved to Cannes in 1861 as he began to suffer from tuberculosis.

He married Pauline Thion de la Chaume, the daughter of another Paris notary, and they had two children. He died from tuberculosis at Cannes at the age of thirty.
