= St. Egidien =

Saint Egidien is the German name for the saint known in English as St. Giles. It may refer to:

- St Egidien, Nuremberg, a church
- Sankt Egidien, a municipality in Saxony
- Sankt Egidien station, the railway station in that municipality
