= St Giles Estate, Lincoln =

Suburb of Lincoln in Lincolnshire, England

Coordinates: 53.245455°N 0.518898°W

St Giles Estate
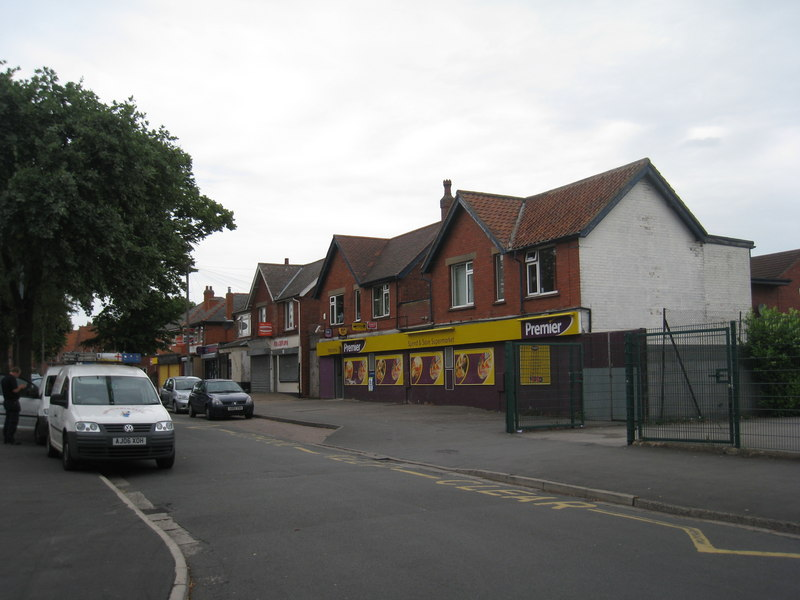
- Lamb Gardens, St. Giles Estate, Lincoln

- Location within Lincolnshire
- District: Lincoln
- Shire county: Lincolnshire
- Region: East Midlands
- Country: England
- Sovereign state: United Kingdom
- Post town: Lincoln
- Postcode district: LN2
- Police: Lincolnshire
- Fire: Lincolnshire
- Ambulance: East Midlands
- UK Parliament: Lincoln

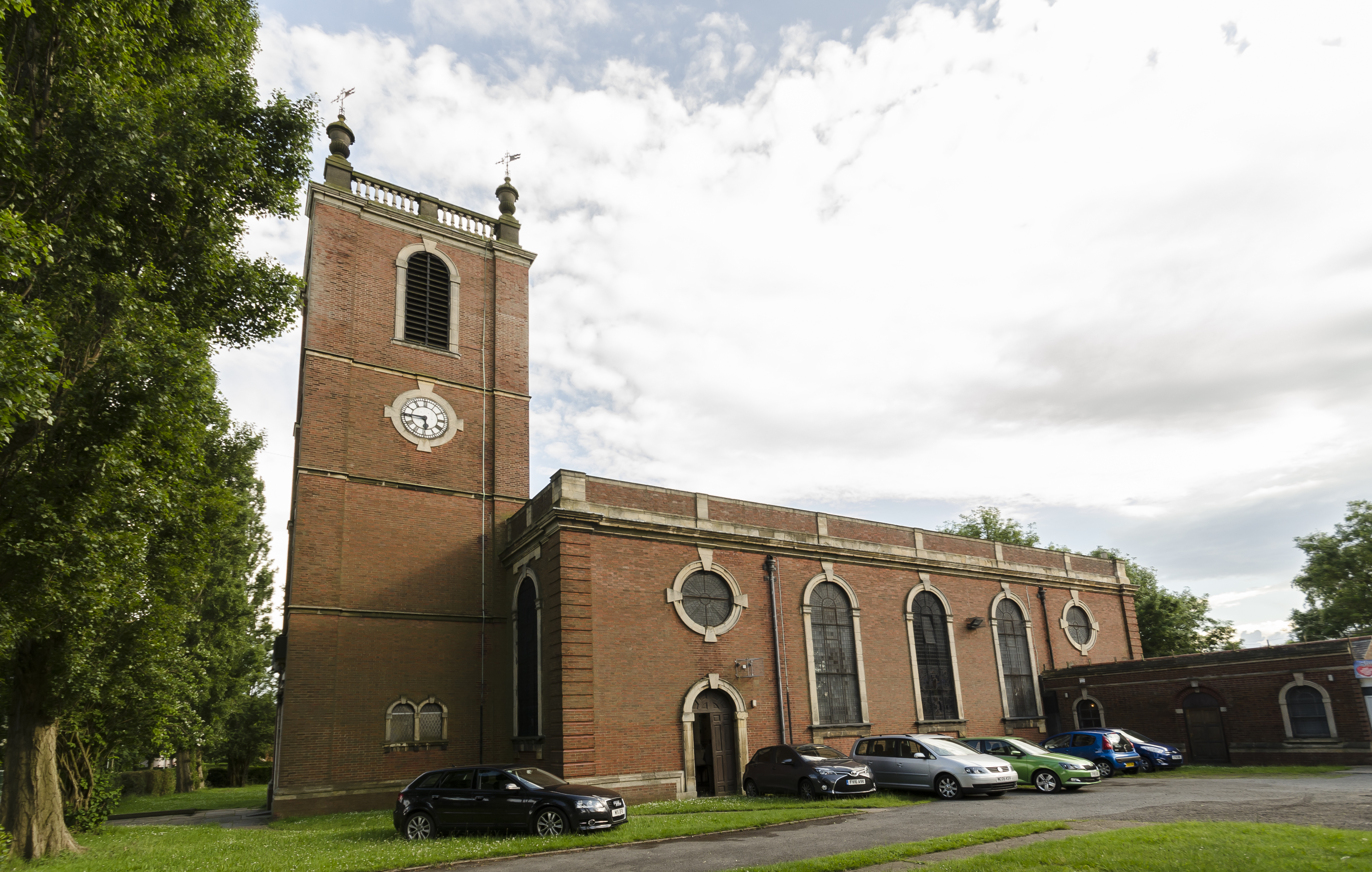
St Giles Church, Lincoln

St. Giles Estate is an inner city area and housing estate of Lincoln in Lincolnshire, England. It is located to the northeast of the city bordering the Ermine Estate to the north and west. The estate was developed largely in the 1920s and 1930s, although some extensions were undertaken immediately after World War II. The design and layout of the estate was influenced by the Garden city movement, and covered around 65 acres, providing some 500 council house units. In addition, a church, St Giles, was erected on the estate in 1936, and a secondary modern school, now incorporated into Lincoln Christ's Hospital School, was built to provide education.

St Giles is among the most deprived areas of the city. The council has sought to address this through investment and in 2020 five new council houses were developed on the site of a former community hall on the estate.

== Sources ==
- Harrod, Peter (2012). The St Giles Secondary Schools: The Story of the Schools as told by the Log Books (PDF). Lincoln Christ's Hospital School.
- Jackson, Andrew J. H. (2015). "The history and heritage of Lincoln's council estates, Local history and critical public history in practice" (PDF). The Local Historian. 45 (2). Bishop Grosseteste University: 115–125.
