= Church of St Giles, Leigh-on-Mendip =

Church in Somerset, England

Church of St Giles
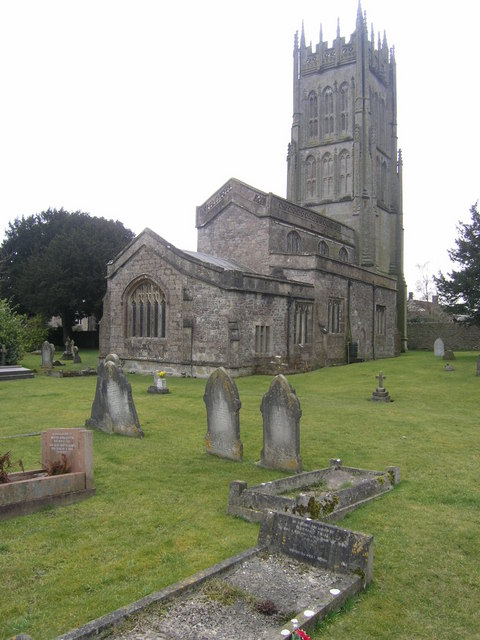

- Location within Somerset

General information
- Location: Leigh-on-Mendip, England
- Coordinates: 51.2239°N 2.4416°W
- Completed: c. 1350

Height
- Height: 94 feet (29 metres)

The Church of St Giles in Leigh-on-Mendip, Somerset, England, dates from around 1350, and was rebuilt around 1500. It is a Grade I listed building, with an unusual faceless clock.

The 93-foot-8-inch (28.55 m) tower dates from around 1464. It contains six bells, five of which date from the 1750s. A scratch sundial can be seen on one of the buttress at the foot of the tower.

There is a stone statue of St Catherine on the sill of the southeast window, which may date from the 12th century. It was found in 1898 and believed to have been moved to the church from the chapel of St Catherine in Mells.

The parish is part of the benefice of Leigh-on-Mendip with Stoke St Michael within the Frome deanery.

== See also ==
- Grade I listed buildings in Mendip
- List of Somerset towers
- List of ecclesiastical parishes in the Diocese of Bath and Wells
