= Saint Giles =

Christian hermit

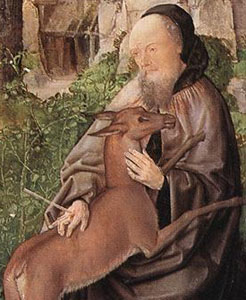
- Detail of Saint Giles and the Hind, by the Master of Saint Giles c. 1500

Abbot, Hermit
- Born: c. 650; Athens, Achaea, Eastern Roman Empire
- Died: c. 710 (aged c. 60); Septimania, Visigothic Kingdom (Languedoc, Southern France)
- Venerated in: Catholic Church; Eastern Orthodox Church; Anglican Communion
- Canonized: Pre-Congregation
- Major shrine: Abbey of Saint-Gilles (Saint-Gilles, France); St. Giles' Cathedral (Edinburgh, Scotland)
- Feast: 1 September
- Attributes: arrow; crosier; hermitage; hind
- Patronage: beggars; blacksmiths; breast cancer; breast feeding; cancer patients; disabled people; Edinburgh (Scotland); epilepsy; noctiphobics; forests; hermits; horses; lepers; mental illness; outcasts; poor people; rams; spur makers; sterility

Giles the Hermit (/dʒaɪlz/, Latin: Ægidius, French: Gilles, Italian: Egidio, Spanish: Gil; c. 650 - c. 710) was a Greek Christian ascetic active in France, most likely in the 7th century. Revered as a saint, his cult became widely diffused but his hagiography is mostly legendary. A town that bears his name grew up around the monastery he purportedly founded, which became a pilgrimage centre and a stop on the Camino de Santiago.

== Historicity ==
The legend of Giles connects him to Caesarius of Arles, who died in 543. In 514, Caesarius sent a messenger, Messianus, to Pope Symmachus in the company of an abbot named Aegidius. It is possible that this abbot is the historical figure at the basis of the legend of Saint Giles.

There are two forged Papal bulls purporting to have been issued by Pope John VIII in 878. Sometimes taken as authentic, they record that the Visigothic king Wamba founded a monastery for Giles and that Pope Benedict II granted a charter to this foundation in 684–685. In actuality, the monastery was not dedicated to Saint Giles before c. 910. The tomb of Giles dates to the correct historical period, but the inscription is from the 10th century.

== Legend ==
Giles is the subject of an elaborate and largely unhistorical anonymous Latin legend first attested in the 10th century. He was a Greek, and, according to the Legendae Aurea, he was the son of King Theodore and Queen Pelagia of Athens.

Although born in Athens, Giles lived in retreats near the mouth of the Rhône and by the River Gard in Septimania in the Visigothic Kingdom. The Legenda Aurea links him with Arles, but finally he withdrew deep into the forest near Nîmes, where in the greatest solitude he spent many years, his sole companion being his beloved deer, or red deer, who in some stories sustained him on her milk. Giles ate a Christian vegetarian diet. This retreat was finally discovered by the king's hunters, who had pursued the deer to its place of refuge. An arrow shot at the deer wounded the saint instead, who afterwards became a patron of the physically disabled. The king, by legend, was Wamba, an anachronistic Visigoth, but must have been a Frank in the original story due to the historical setting. He held the hermit in high esteem for his humility in rejecting all honours save having some disciples. Wamba built him a monastery in his valley, Saint-Gilles-du-Gard, which Giles placed under the Benedictine rule. He died there in the early part of the 8th century, with the highest repute for sanctity and miracles.

A 10th-century Vita sancti Aegidii recounts that, as Giles was celebrating Mass to pardon Emperor Charlemagne's sins, an angel deposited upon the altar a letter outlining a sin so terrible Charlemagne had never dared confess it. Several Latin and French texts, including the Legenda Aurea refer to this hidden "sin of Charlemagne". This legend, however, contradicts the well-established later dates for the life of Charlemagne (c. 742 – 28 January 814).

A later text, the Liber miraculorum sancti Aegidii ("The Book of Miracles of Saint Giles") served to reinforce the flow of pilgrims to the abbey.

== Veneration ==
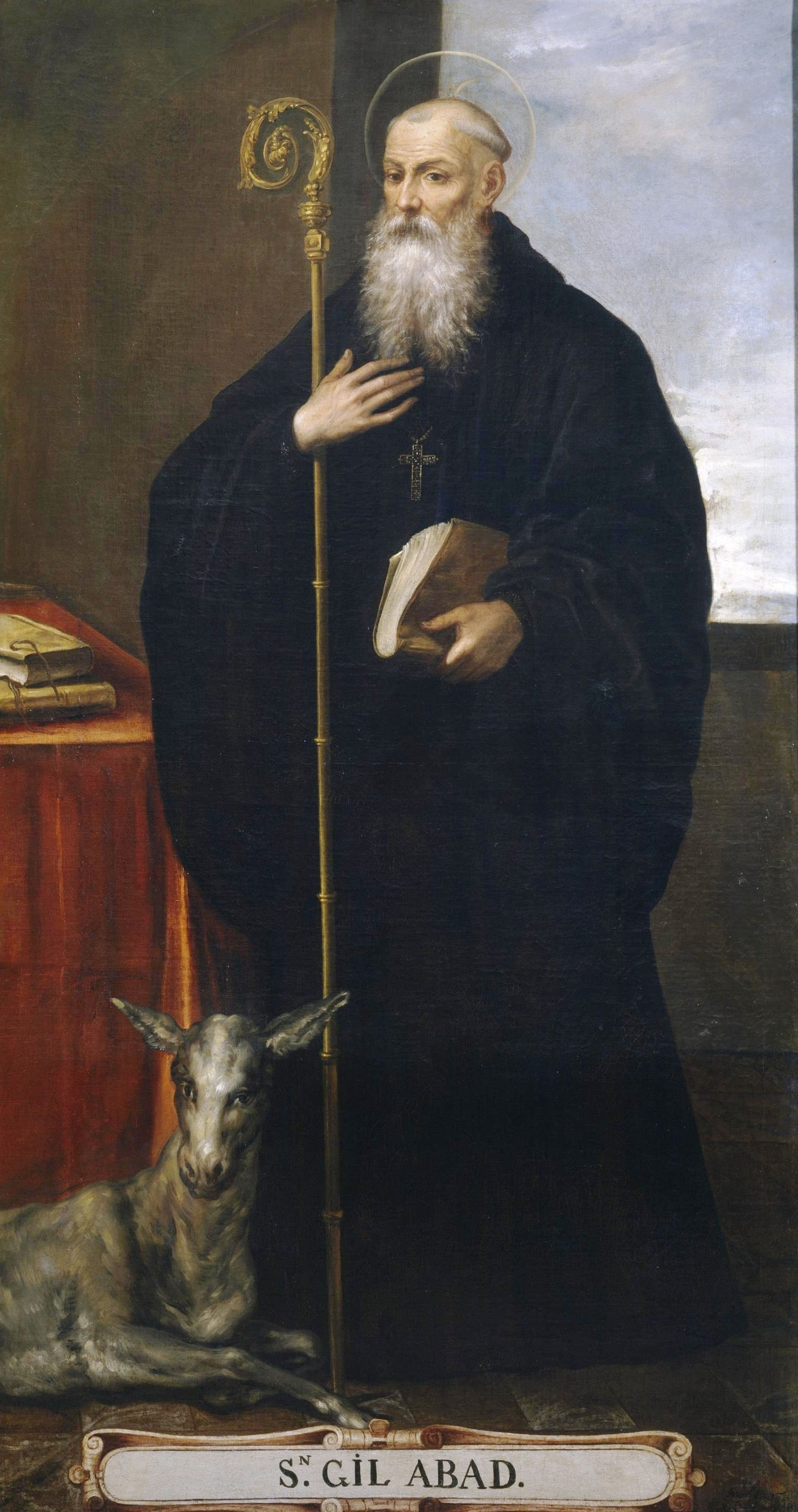
Saint Giles, Abbot, by Bartolomé Román, Museo del Prado, Madrid.

The town of St-Gilles-du-Gard sprang up around the abbey allegedly founded by him in the 7th century. That abbey (which was rededicated to him in the 10th century) remained the centre of his cult, which was particularly strong in Languedoc, even after a rival body of Saint Giles appeared at Toulouse.

He was one of the most popular saints in the Middle Ages. His cult spread rapidly far and wide throughout Europe, as is witnessed by the churches and monasteries dedicated to him in present-day France, Spain, Germany, Poland, Hungary, Slovakia, and Great Britain; by the numerous manuscripts in prose and verse commemorating his virtues and miracles; and especially by the vast concourse of pilgrims who flocked to his shrine.

In 1562, the relics of the saint were secretly transferred to Toulouse to protect them from the Huguenots and the level of pilgrimages declined. The restoration of most of the relics to the abbey of Saint-Gilles-du-Gard in 1862 and the publicized rediscovery of his former tomb there in 1865 helped the pilgrimages recommence.

Saint Giles is the patron saint of people with disabilities and is also invoked as a saint for childhood fears, convulsions, depression, particularly in Normandy, for example in Eure Iville, Saint-Germain-Village or Bernay or in Calvados, Gilles Touques. In medieval art, he is depicted with his symbol, the hind (female deer). His emblem is also an arrow. Giles is one of the Fourteen Holy Helpers, and the only non-martyr, initially invoked as protection against the Black Death. His feast day is 1 September.

Besides Saint-Gilles-du-Gard, nineteen other cities bear his name. Cities that possess relics of St. Giles include Saint-Gilles, Toulouse and many other French cities; Antwerp, Brugge and Tournai in Belgium; Cologne and Bamberg in Germany (known as Egidien); Rome and Bologna in Italy; Prague in the Czech Republic. Giles is also the patron saint of Edinburgh, the capital of Scotland, where St. Giles' High Kirk is a prominent landmark and patron Saint of Elgin in north east Scotland. He is also the patron saint of Graz, Nuremberg, Osnabrück, Sankt Gilgen, Brunswick, Wollaberg, Saint-Gilles (Brussels Capital Region), Sint-Gillis-Waas and Poprad. In 1630, the church of Sant'Egidio in Trastevere in Rome was dedicated to him, and which since 1968 has housed the lay Community of Sant'Egidio.

The centuries-long presence of Crusaders, many of them of French origin, left the name of Saint Giles in some locations in the Middle East. Raymond of St Gilles lent his name to St. Gilles Castle (Qala'at Sanjil) in Tripoli, Lebanon.

Giles of Provence is remembered in the Church of England with a commemoration on 1 September.

== See also ==
- Basilica of St Giles in Slovakia
- Chalfont St Giles in Buckinghamshire
- St Giles' Cathedral in Edinburgh
- Hermitage of Sant'Egidio in Scanno, Abruzzo

== Sources ==
- Vita sancti Aegidii (Acta sanctorum, 9 September, 299–304)
- Legenda Aurea, 130: Sanctus Egidius (On-line text, in Caxton's translation)
- Chaucer, Geoffrey; Schmidt, Aubrey Vincent Carlyle (1976). The General Prologue to the Canterbury Tales and the Canon's Yeoman's Prologue and Tale. Holmes & Meier. ISBN 0-8419-0219-4.
- Wyschogrod, Edith (1990). Saints and Postmodernism: Revisioning Moral Philosophy. University of Chicago Press. ISBN 0-226-92043-7.
