= Corn exchanges in England =

Commodity trading halls in England

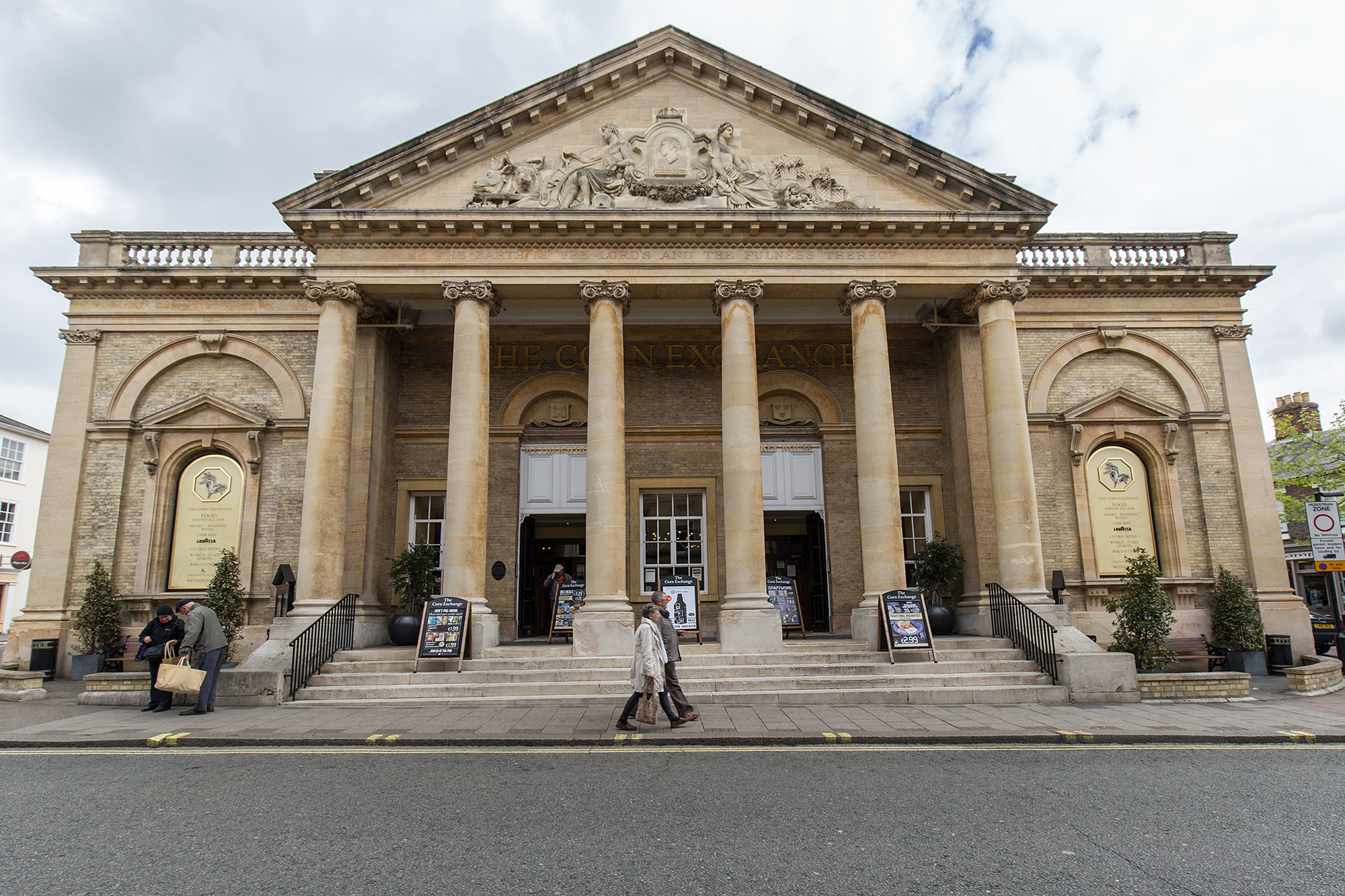
Corn Exchange, Bury St Edmunds

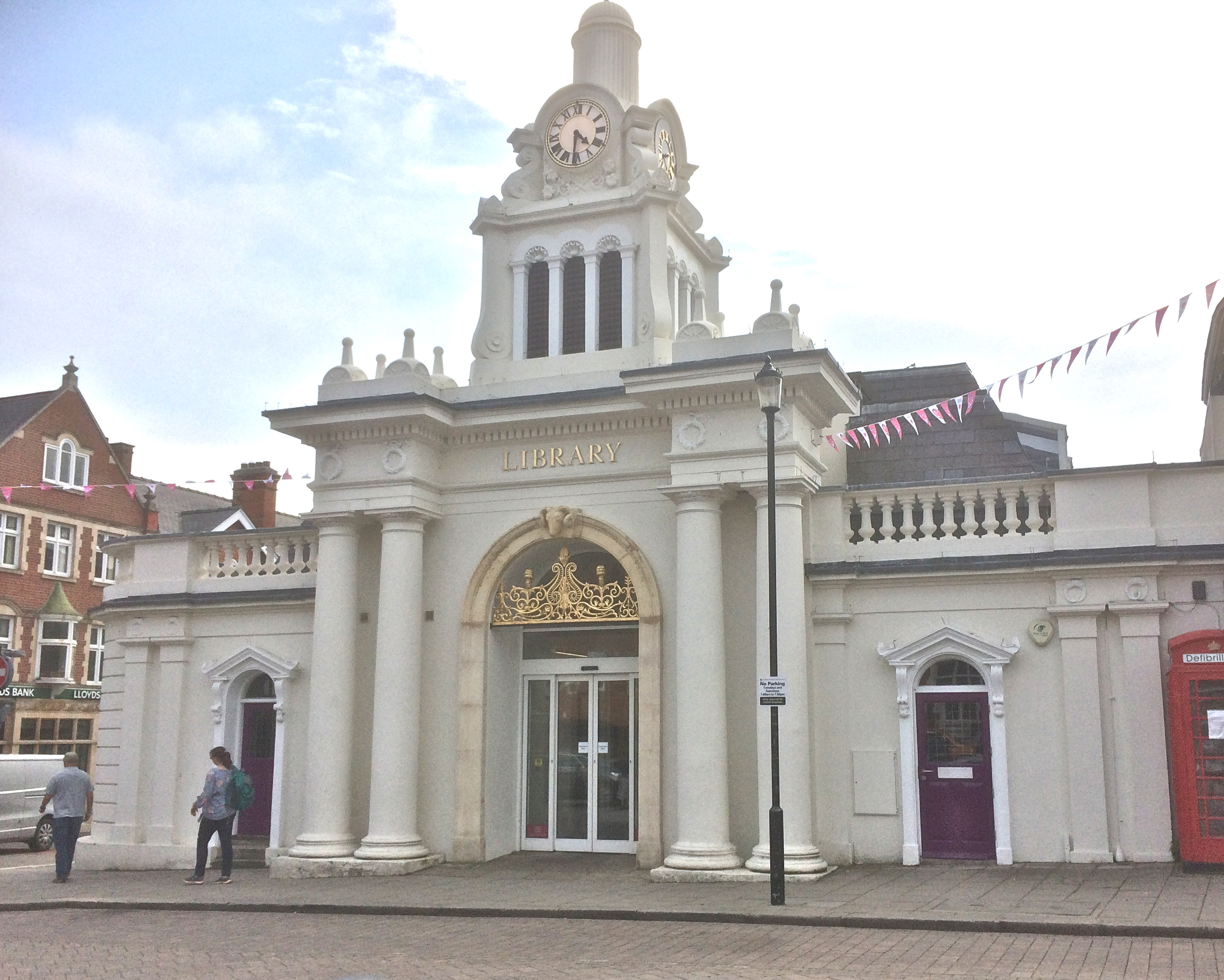
Corn Exchange, Saffron Walden c. 1847

Corn exchanges are distinct buildings which were originally created as a venue for corn merchants to meet and arrange pricing with farmers for the sale of wheat, barley, and other corn crops. The word "corn" in British English denotes all cereal grains, such as wheat and barley. With the repeal of the Corn Laws in 1846, a large number of corn exchanges were built in England, particularly in the corn-growing areas of Eastern England.

However, with the fall in price of English corn as a result of cheap imports, corn exchanges mostly ceased to be built after the 1870s. Increasingly they were put to other uses, particularly as meeting and concert halls. Many found a new lease of life in the early 20th century as cinemas. Following the Second World War, many could not be maintained, and they were demolished. In the 1970s their architectural importance came to be appreciated, and most of the surviving examples are listed buildings. Most of the surviving corn exchanges have now been restored, and many have become arts centres, theatres, or concert halls.

== Early corn exchanges ==
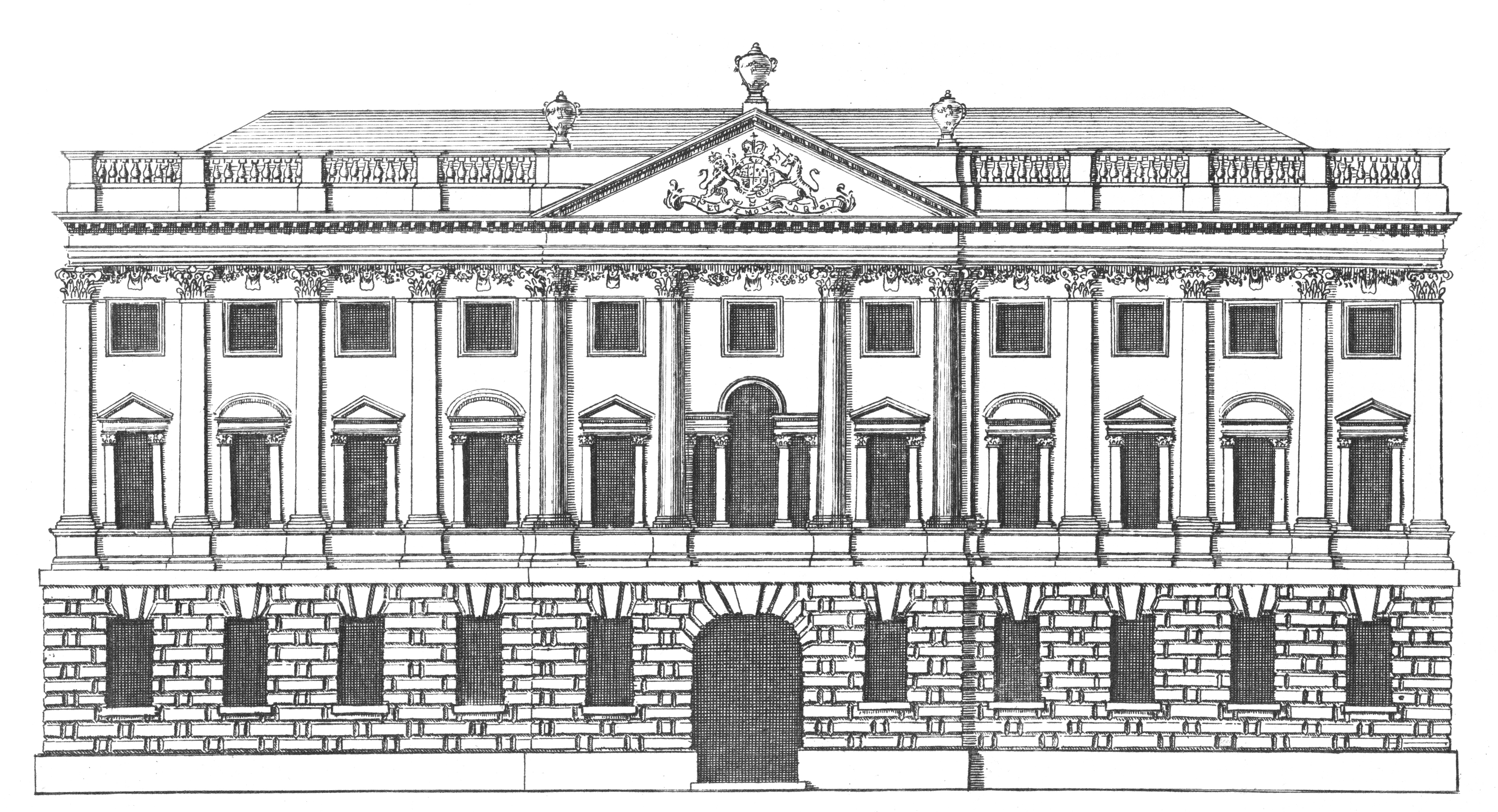
The North Front of the Exchange at Bristol

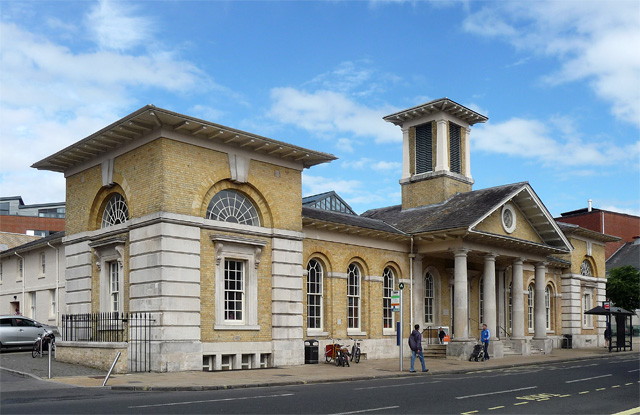
Corn Exchange, Winchester

Corn exchanges were initially held as open markets normally controlled by the town or city authorities. Corn exchanges start appearing in the earlier part of the 18th century. At Bristol corn was sometimes traded at the Exchange Buildings in conjunction with other goods and produce. The Bristol Exchange was built to the designs of the Bath architect John Wood, the Elder in 1741–1743. Wood also designed the equally impressive exchange in Liverpool (which is now Liverpool Town Hall) in 1749–1754. In London the earliest covered corn exchange building was the London Corn Exchange built in Mark Lane in 1747. At Brighton, a corn exchange was built as part of the Brighton Dome. Other corn exchanges followed with Wisbech (1811), Norwich (1828), Sheffield (1830), Stowmarket (1836), Bury St Edmunds (1837) and Cambridge (1842). Many of the early corn exchanges, such as Hadleigh and Winchester, were built round quadrangles where the trading took place, but the central area was roofed over at a later date.

== After the repeal of the Corn Laws ==
It was the repeal of the Corn Laws in 1846 which led to an explosion in corn exchange building. This also coincided with the boom in railway building, resulting in the easier transportation of corn. In some towns the corn exchanges were built by the civic authorities but in others speculative Market Companies were set up to promote the trading of corn. Considerable civic and commercial rivalry ensued and in the small market town of Market Rasen in Lincolnshire two corn exchanges were built in 1854. As these corn exchanges were rarely operating for more than two hours in a week, the buildings would be let out for many other purposes including public meetings concerts and dances. With the Great Depression of British Agriculture, which occurred from about 1873 to 1893, the building of new corn exchanges had largely ceased by 1880. The building of new exchanges was limited to re-building earlier exchanges, normally as part of larger market schemes.

== Corn exchanges in the 20th century ==
In the 20th century corn markets were often also used as cinemas or for venues for roller skating or wrestling. In the later part of the 1950s the following two decades they had often become dilapidated and uneconomic to maintain. This resulted in the widespread demolition of many corn exchanges, particularly in smaller market towns. However, an increasing appreciation of their architectural merit led to many becoming Listed Buildings. More recently many have been renovated by local authorities or community trusts as Arts venues. Many of the smaller exchanges had ceased trading by the start of the 20th century. However, the larger centres continued to grow and the corn exchange at Lincoln recorded its busiest trading year in 1924. After the Second World War the larger markets gradually closed. Lincoln ceased trading in 1984 and Leeds continued until 1995.

== Corn exchanges listed by ceremonial counties of England ==
=== Bedfordshire ===
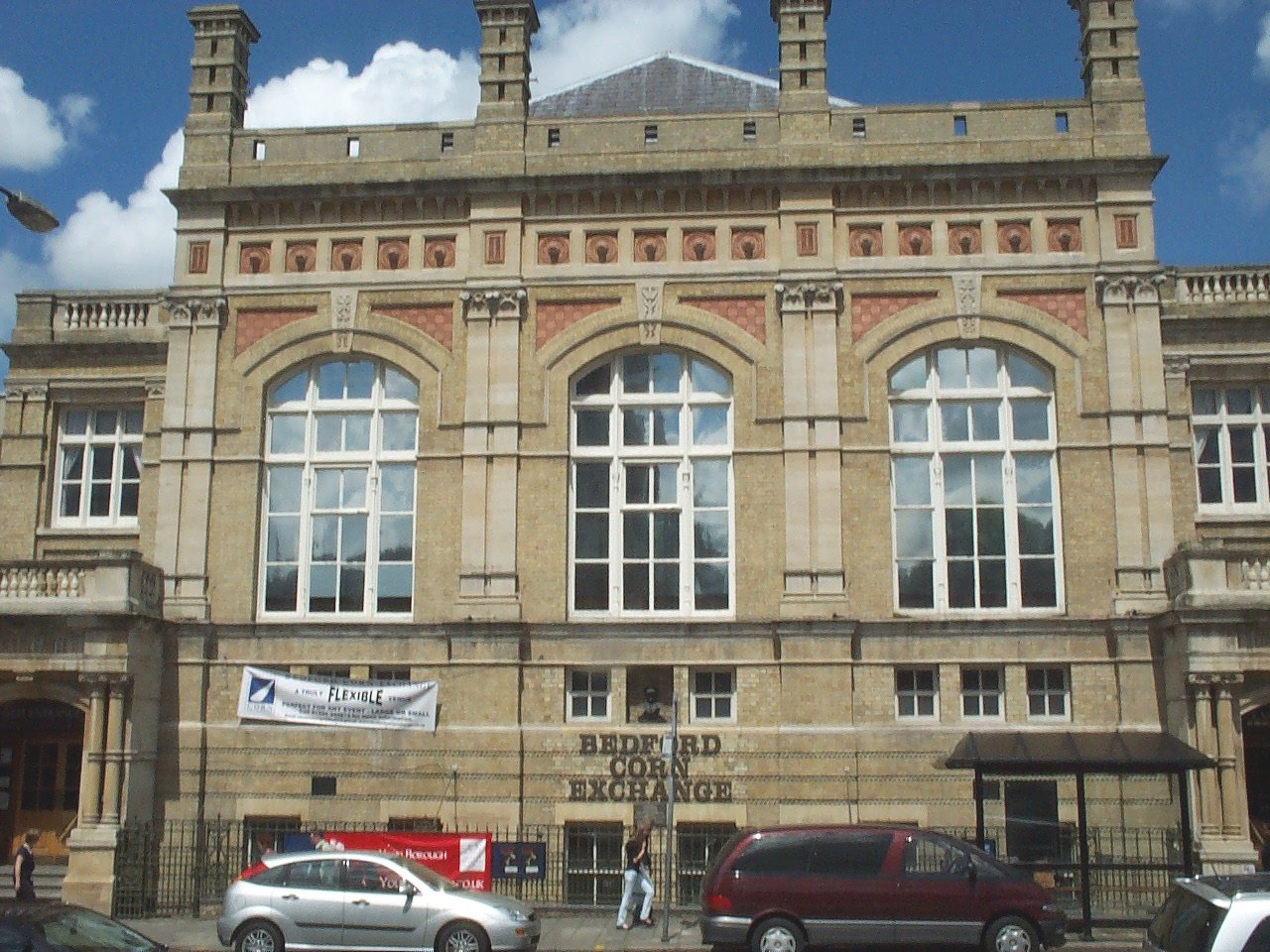
Bedford Corn Exchange, 1874

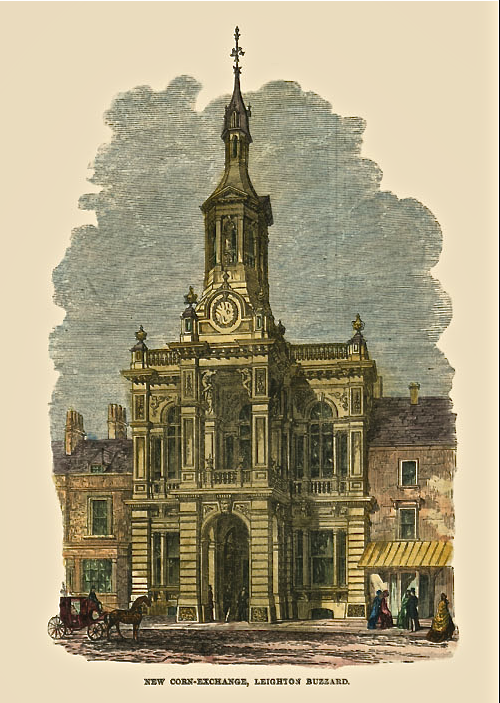
Leighton Buzzard Corn Exchange 1862–1863

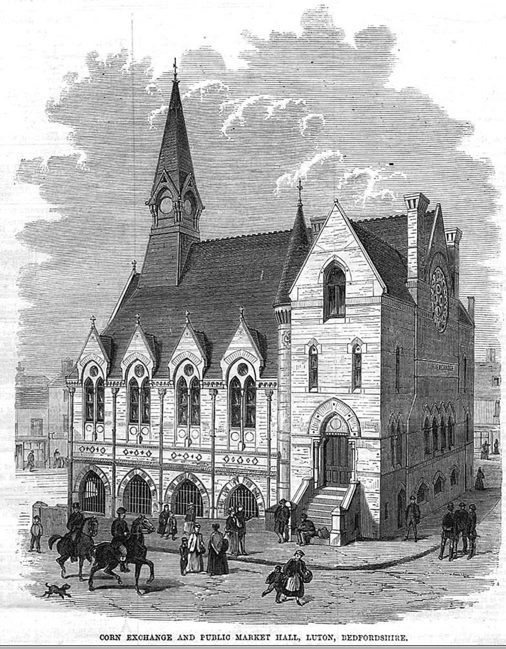
Luton Corn Exchange, 1859

- Bedford Corn Exchange. 1874. St Paul's Square. By Ladd's and Powell. Built of stone with three bays and very big segmented-arched first floor windows, and an attic with four big chimneys like pinnacles.
- Leighton Buzzard, Corn Exchange, Lake Road, 1862. By Bellamy and Hardy. According to Pevsner: "Victorian at its most irresponsible. Gay and vulgar, with two two-storeyed middle porch adorned with atlantes and caryatids. The style is a kind of dissolute Renaissance." The London Illustrated News of 23 May 1863 described the Exchange as "a very handsome stone structure, situated in a commanding position, at one end of the market-place, with a good frontage. The Exchange-hall is spacious, and decorated with Ionic pilasters, cornice, and recessed, arched windows at the sides; the ceiling is formed into sunk coffers by enriched stiles, supported by coved ribs ... The design throughout is chaste and original, the front being designed in the modern Italian style of architecture, and consists of two stories of three light Venetian windows." The cost of site and buildings was about £7500. It later was used as a cinema and in 1932 the spire above the portico became unsafe and was taken down. The Exchange was demolished in 1966.
- Luton. Market Hill at the top of George Street. 1868 in Victorian Gothic style with frontage with gothic arches and steep spire. Architects were Grundy and Messenger of London, built Smart Brothers of Luton, and owned by Luton Borough Council. Partially demolished in 1951 and later fully demolished by 1994. This replaced an earlier Corn Market House of 1775. This was described by Joseph Hawkes in 1823: "The old Corn Market house, a prominent and memorable building standing on the site of the present Corn Exchange ... The old place was built on pillars, open on all sides, with corn chambers on the upper floor when any unsold grain could be stored, a market bell on the centre of the ridge, which was also used as a firebell."

=== Berkshire ===
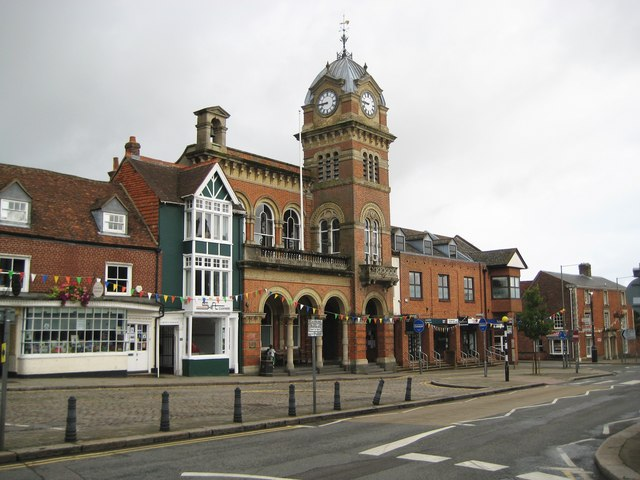
Hungerford Town Hall - contains a former corn exchange at the back of the building

- Hungerford Corn Exchange. High Street. Now part of Hungerford Town Hall. Grade II listed. Florentine Gothic. Designed by Ernest Prestwick of Leigh in Lancashire in 1870. Two storey with slate roof with parapet at front and corbeled eaves at sides, lead cupola and balcony, red brick with yellow moulded dressings, stone copings, cornices, bell arch balustrade and columns. Bracketed cornices, patterned frieze, channelled brick pilasters with stone capitals. Meeting rooms at front with stair to rear and corn exchange hall at right angles to rear. To the front a clock tower over entrance on the right, with three semi-circular arched glazing windows in recessed yellow brick arches beneath these are double arched windows with columns and ornate decoration in tympanum of large outer arch. Stone plinth and three steps up.

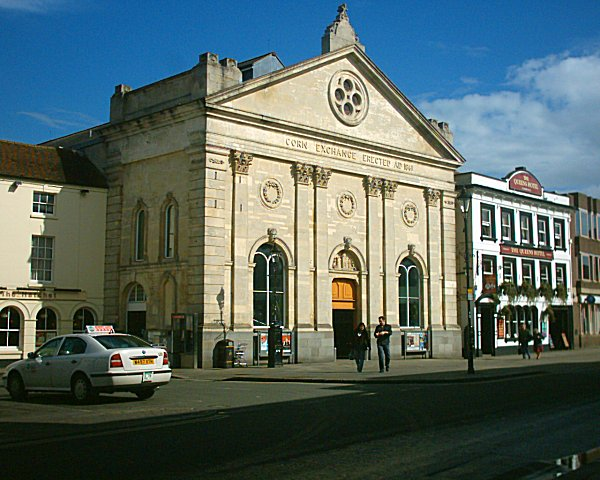
Newbury Corn Exchange

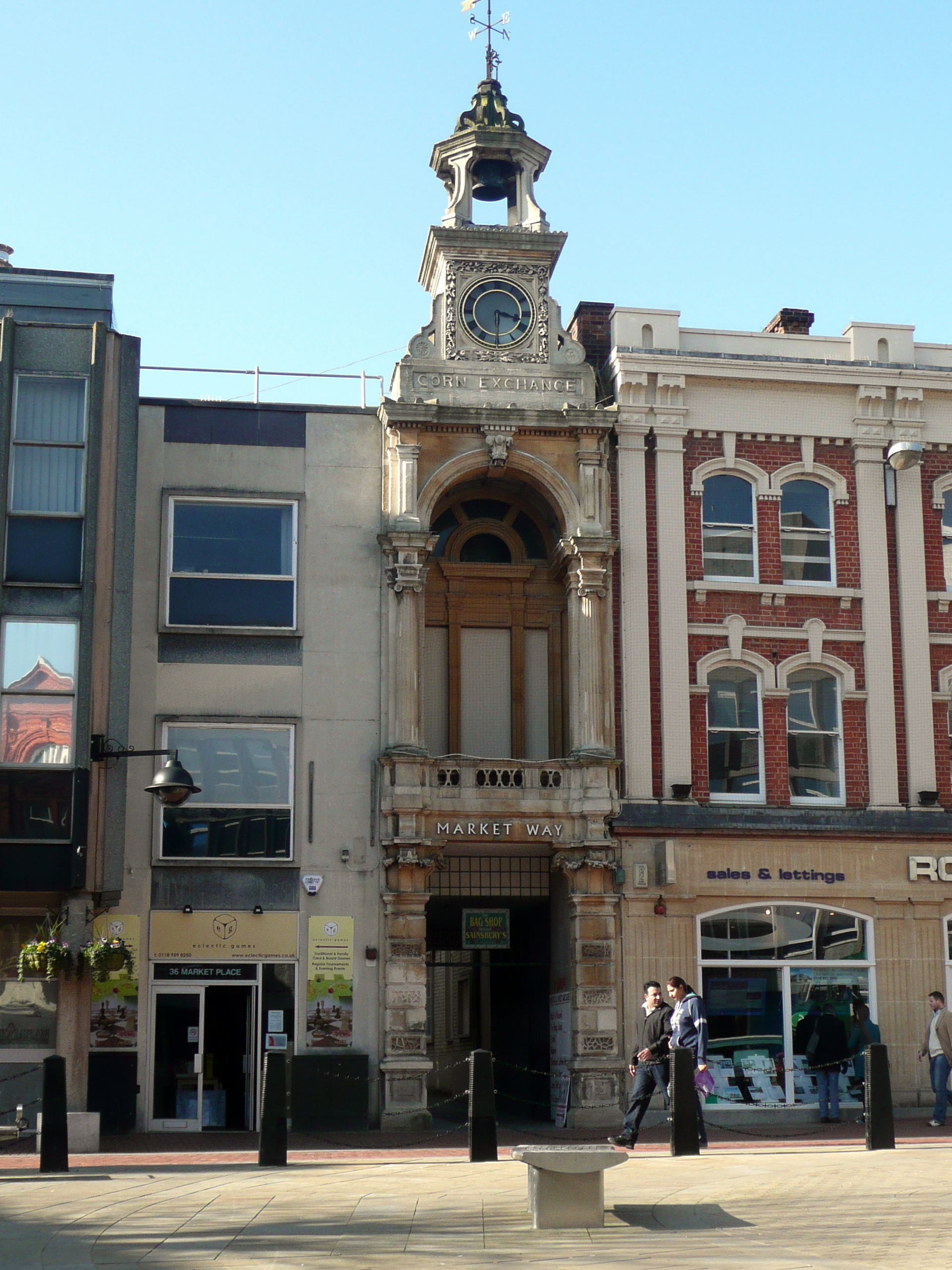
Corn Exchange Arcade, Market Place, Reading

- Newbury Corn Exchange, Market Place. The building was originally a corn exchange which opened for trade in 1862, but after the decline in corn trading it was used for public meetings; in 1993 it was opened as an arts centre after a £3.5 million refurbishment. The building is now a Grade II listed building. In 2000 Newbury Corn Exchange passed from West Berkshire Council to The Corn Exchange (Newbury) Trust, an independent charity.
- Reading Corn Exchange, Market Place 1854. Grade II listed. Corn Exchange by J B Clacy and F Hawker. Renaissance style with single bay in Bath stone ashlar. Three stages capped by pepper-pot turret with a bell and weathervane. Lower stage has rusticated piers with swagged fruit caps to lintel. Second stage an arched recess with pierced balcony and flanking fluted Ionic columns. Keystone with Prince of Wales crest and motto. Top stage has Corn Exchange in relief on base and brackets to elaborate fruit and flower carved border to gilt and blue clock. Now an entrance to shopping arcade.

=== Bristol ===
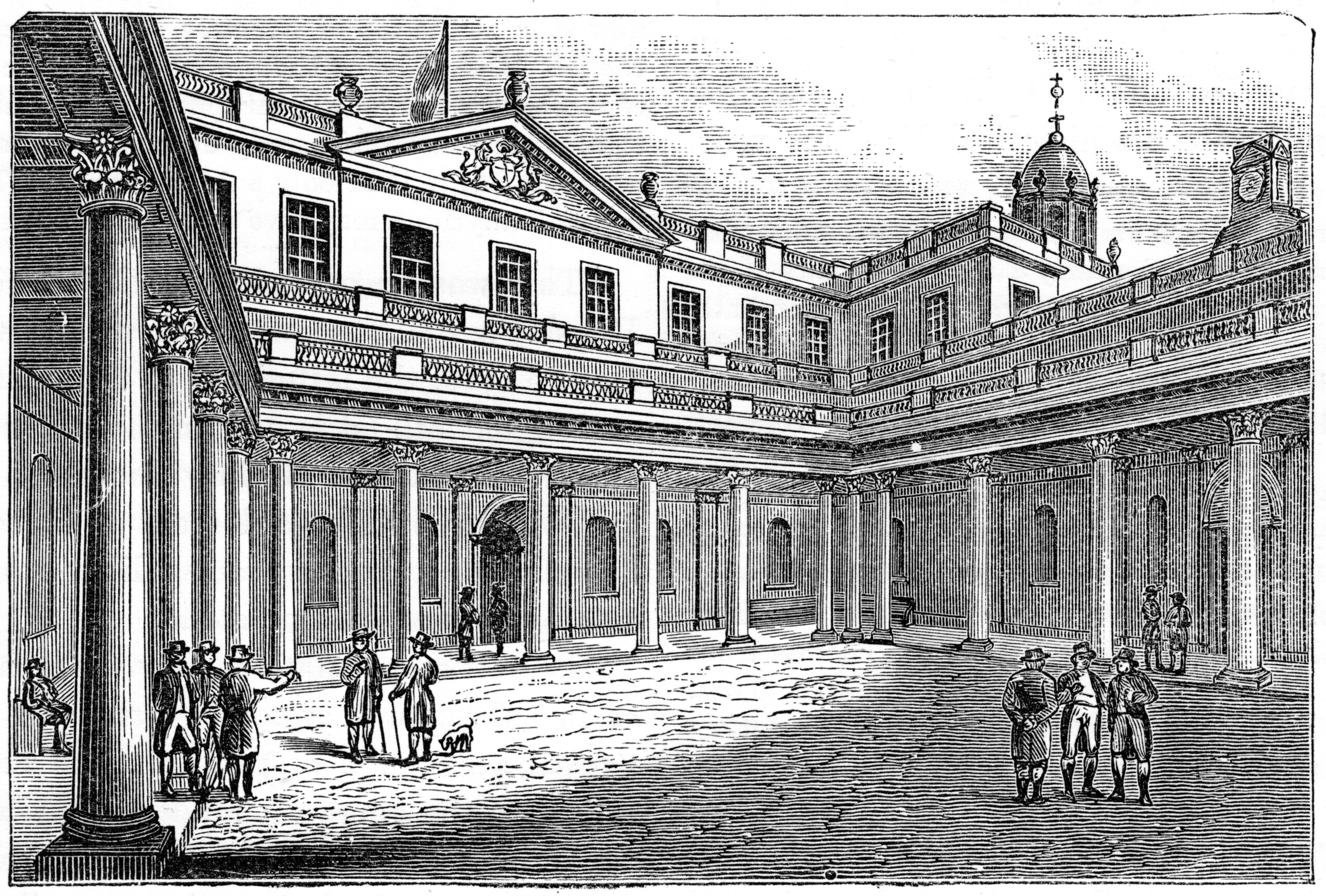
The Exchange, Bristol, interior

- The Exchange, Bristol. The Exchange is a Grade I listed building built in 1741–43 by John Wood the Elder, on Corn Street, near the junction with Broad Street. It was previously used as a corn and general trade exchange but is now used as offices and the St Nicholas Market. In 1872 there was a major programme of building works to a design by Edward Middleton Barry. This provided a roof over the central court of the Exchange. Outside the building are four bronze tables dating from the 16th and 17th centuries, known as "nails", at which merchants traded.

=== Cambridgeshire ===
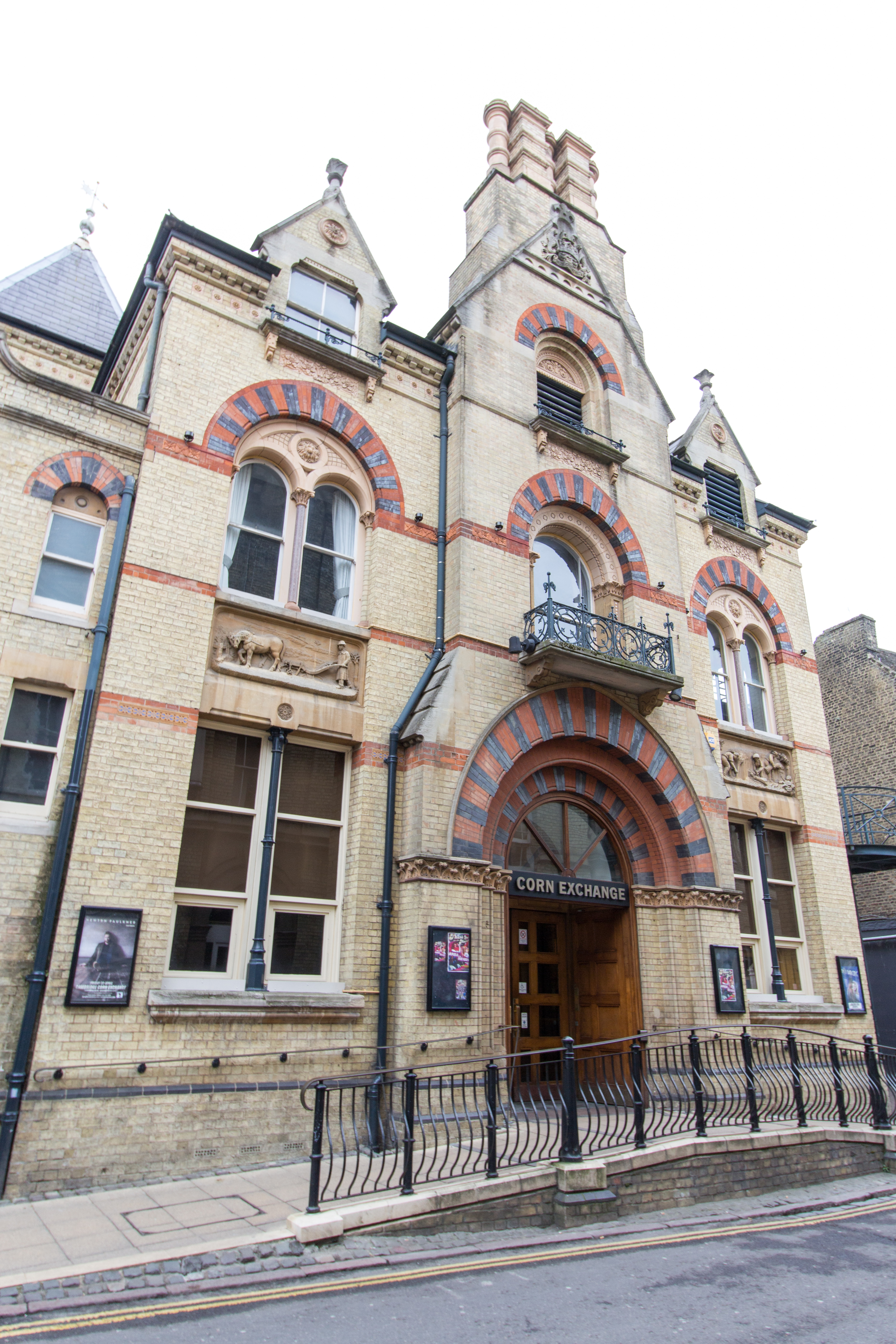
Cambridge Corn Exchange

- Cambridge Corn Exchange. Florentine Gothic with decorative polychrome brickwork over window arches. 1875–1876. By Richard Reynolds Rowe. Successful design in the competition of 1869 assessed by Alfred Waterhouse. Polychrome brickwork using grey gault brick with red and blue brick dressings and tiled bands. Three-bay entrance front onto Wheeler Street with the arched entrance set forward. Ten-bay frontage on Corn Exchange Street. Roof of glass and cast iron. The interior makes use of decorative local and industrial materials, coloured bricks. cast-iron, terracotta, encaustic tiles and faience. This building replaced an earlier corn exchange by Bellamy and Hardy of 1858, not necessarily on this site.
- Peterborough. Exchange Street/ Church Street. Built in 1848. Simple classical facade with pilasters. Trading in corn continued until 1961, but from 1954 it had been used as a music and dance hall until demolition in 1964. Replaced by the Norwich Union building, which was demolished in 2009.

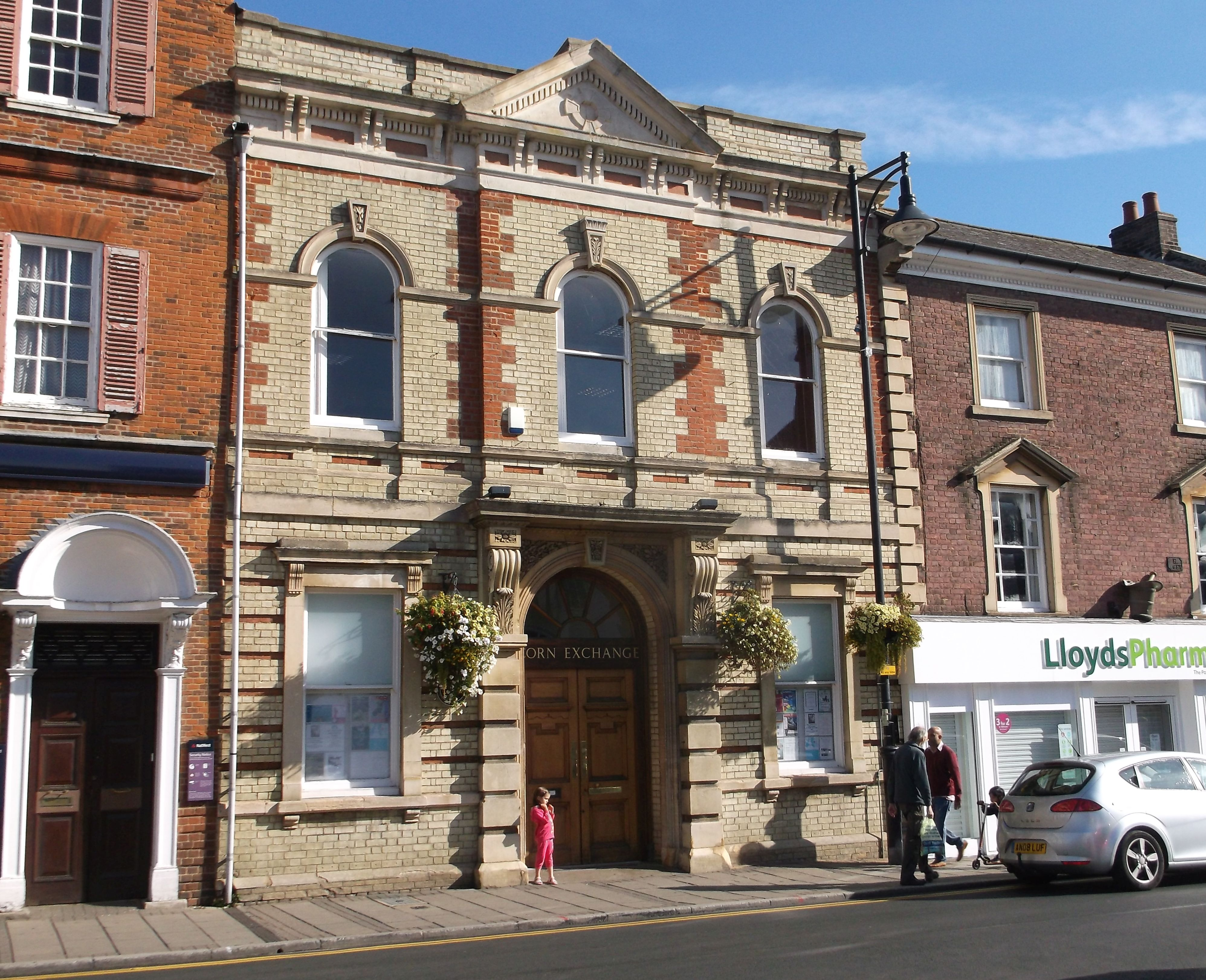
St Ives Corn Exchange, 1864

- St Ives Corn Exchange. The Pavement. 1864. Grade II listed. By Robert Hutchinson of St Ives and Huntingdon. Two storeys with double-fronted facade with three windows and projecting pedimented central bay. Gault brick with red brick and stone dressings. Parapet surmounted by urns. Stone entablature with bracketed dentil cornice. Rusticated brick ground floor. Round-arched recessed windows at first floor level. Restored and re-opened as a community venue in June 2010.

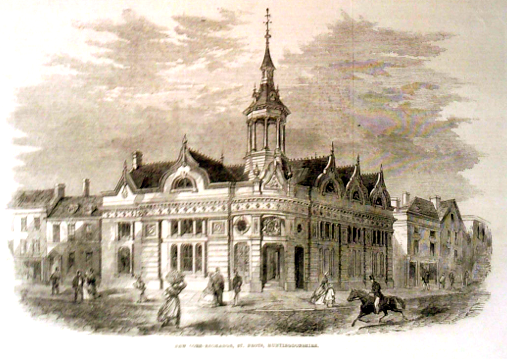
St Neots Corn Exchange 1863–1865

- St Neots. Corn exchange, corner of South Street with High Street. 1863–1865. "Yellow brick with rounded corner and jolly cast-ironwork" Corner of High Street and South Street. Constructed in 1865. According to the Illustrated London News the architect was Pearson Bellamy of Lincoln. In 1915 the building was purchased by C. A. James, landlord of the Bridge Hotel, who opened it as a cinema. The building caught fire in 1929 and the cupola fell down. It was refurbished and renamed the Pavilion Cinema, but in 1969 the whole building was demolished.
- Wisbech Corn Exchange. Following the draining of The Fens, the area became one of the largest corn producers. The Port of Wisbech became one of the biggest shippers of grain. The corn exchange extension by Bellamy and Hardy of Lincoln, 1858 stands behind the original Exchange Hall. It later became a popular concert venue and performers included the rock band, The Rolling Stones, in July 1963. The proprietor Norman Jacobs MBE also set up skating rinks, would run Saturday night dances and brought some of biggest names in show business to the Corn Exchange. The Jacobs family are still the owners. A trust has been set up to restore the building.

=== City of London ===
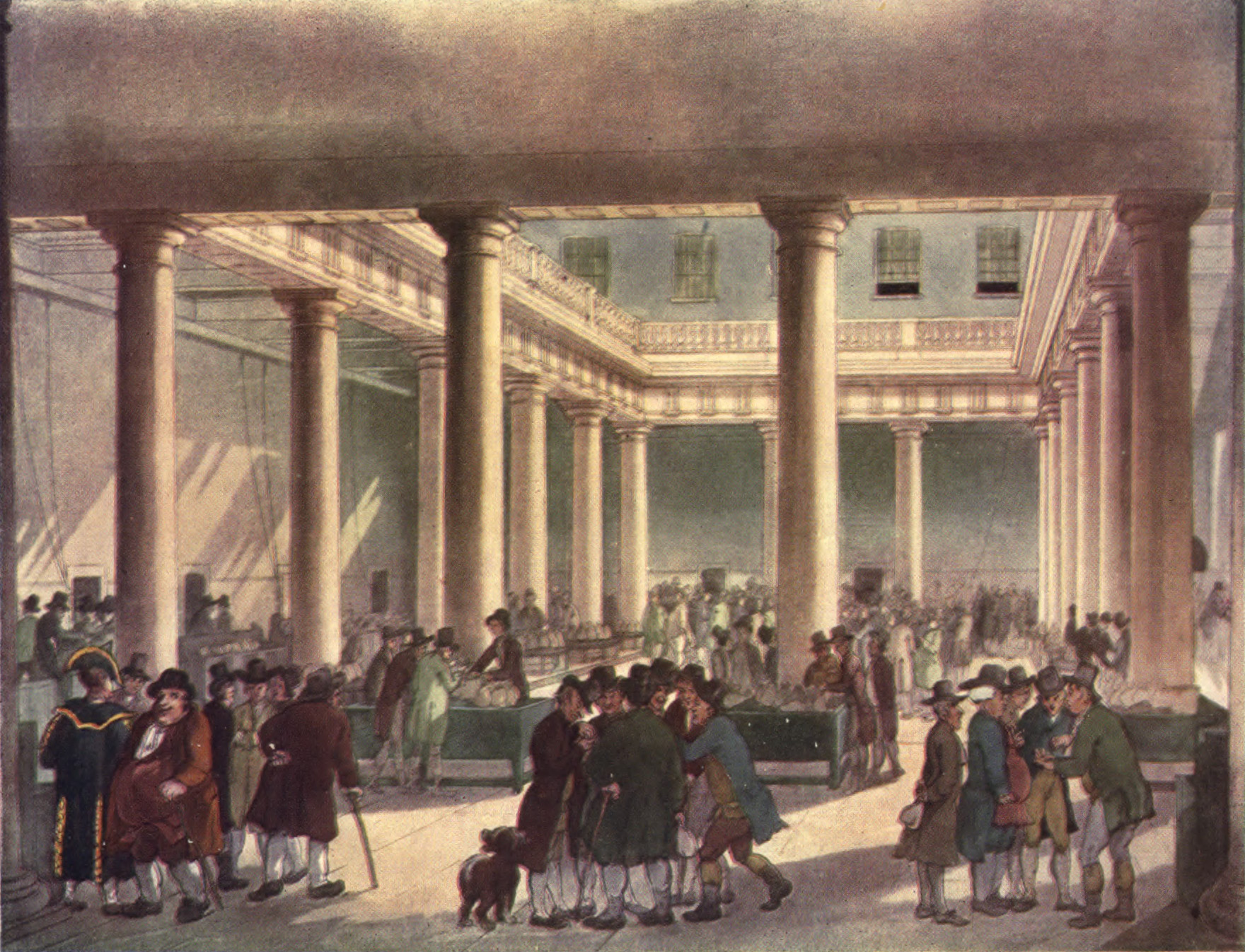
Corn Exchange, London, 1808

- London Corn Exchange. The first corn exchange opened in Mark Lane in 1747, bringing together the various agents who sold oats, beans and all kinds of grain on behalf of the farmers. (Corn, brought by river into the City, was customarily landed at Bear Quay, not far from the Exchange.) The first corn exchange was designed by George Dance the Elder in the neoclassical style, and built around a courtyard which was open to the sky. The courtyard was surrounded by stalls or counters at which samples were available of the goods being traded. In 1826 a rival exchange was set up by a group of discontented traders (the London Corn Exchange). Permission having been granted by Parliament, they established their "new" exchange, also in Mark Lane, immediately alongside the "old" exchange. It was designed in the Greek style by George Smith, and opened in 1828. In 1882, the "Old Exchange" was largely demolished and replaced by a far larger building (designed by Edward I'Anson) in the Italianate style. The two exchanges were amalgamated in 1926. Smith's "New Exchange" was demolished five years later; ten years after that, I'Anson's 1882 Corn Exchange was destroyed in the Blitz. Its replacement, by Terence Heysham, was opened in 1952 and continued trading until 1987. The remaining traders moved to the Baltic Exchange in St Mary Axe.

=== Cheshire ===
- Chester, Eastgate Street. 1859. Gothic in style. Entered through a long passage from the street. Demolished in the 1920s. The site in front of the corn exchange was later occupied by the Picturedrome Cinema, which became part of Woolworths from around 1928; the site is now occupied by Next.
- Nantwich. On the bank of the river Weaver. Town hall and corn exchange designed in Gothic style by the Birmingham architect James Cranston in 1859. Demolished to make way for modern swimming baths.
- Sandbach Literary Institute. The Literary Institute and corn exchange were built to designs by Sir George Gilbert Scott in 1859.

=== Cornwall ===
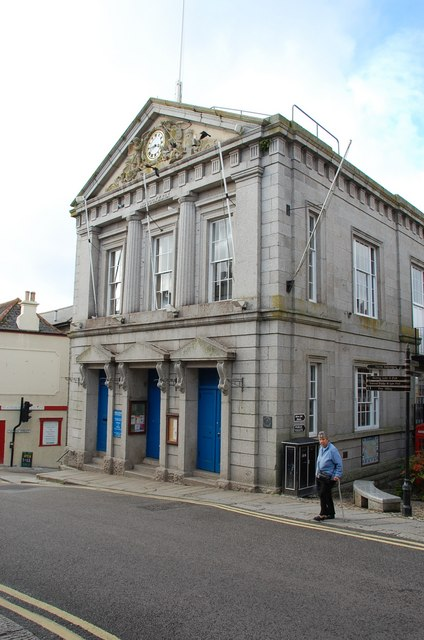
Helston Guildhall and former corn exchange

- Camborne Corn Exchange. 19 Commercial Street, Camborne. Italianate with tower and rustication. Now Wetherspoons.
- Helston Guildhall was constructed of Granite Ashlar on the site of the old market house in 1839. Inside it contains the Council Chamber and the Mayor's Parlour on the top floor with a large function room below which was once the corn exchange.
- Lostwithiel Corn Exchange. 1740. Now accommodates the Lostwithiel Museum, Fore Street, Lostwithiel.
- St Austell Corn Exchange. Bull Ring. 1854. The building also housed the St Austell Reading Rooms and St Austell's first free library. Demolished 1960.

=== Derbyshire ===
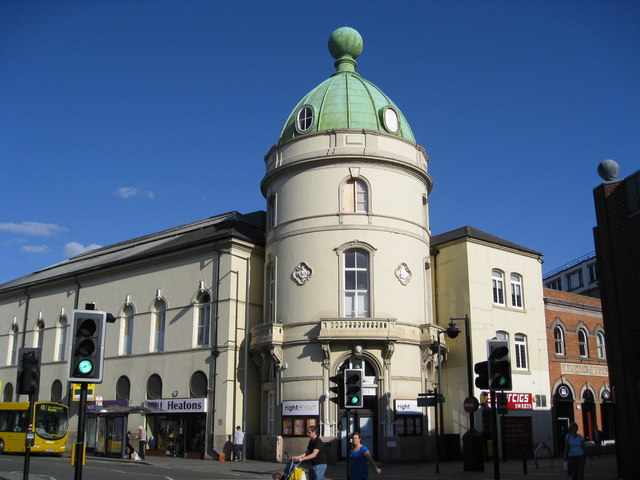
Corn Exchange, Derby

- Derby Corn Exchange. Albert Street. (1862). The corn exchange building is on the corner of Albert Street and Exchange Street. Although the Corn Exchange Company was wound up in 1881, the building was still used as a corn exchange and, from 1897, was also the Palace Theatre of Varieties. After the First World War, the building was converted into a dance hall. In 1929 the Derby Evening Telegraph, took over the building, re-naming it Northcliffe House. The newspaper moved out in late 1979. The corn exchange building was then divided into separate retail and office units, while the main body of the hall has been used as a snooker club. It is Grade II listed.

=== Devon ===
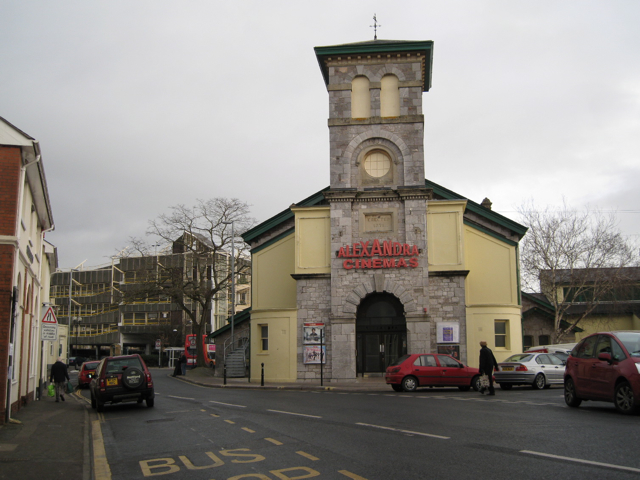
Alexandra Theatre, Newton Abbot

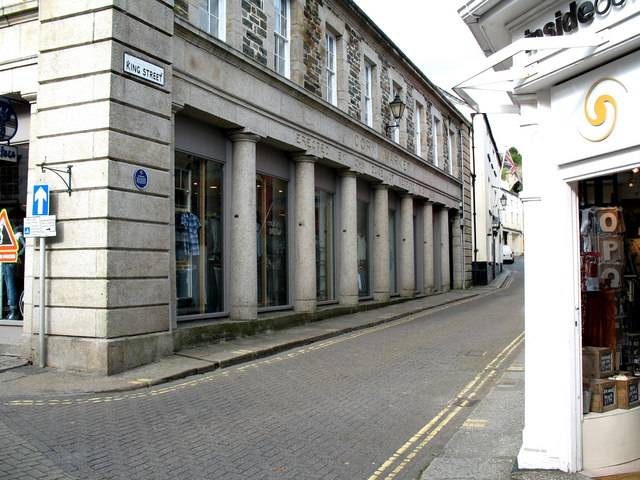
Corn Market, Tavistock

- Exeter Corn Exchange. Market Street. 1960. Market hall and events venue erected on the site of a much older structure known as the Lower Market.
- Newton Abbot Corn Exchange. Market Street. 1871. Grade II listed. Italianate palazzo style central projecting belvedere tower in three stages has wide eaves and a modillion cornice to a shallow-pitched pyramidal roof. Squared Devon limestone and stucco with some freestone dressings, slate roof and moulded stack to the rear of left return. Now a cinema.
- Tavistock Corn Market. Corner of West Street and King Street. 1835.

=== Dorset ===
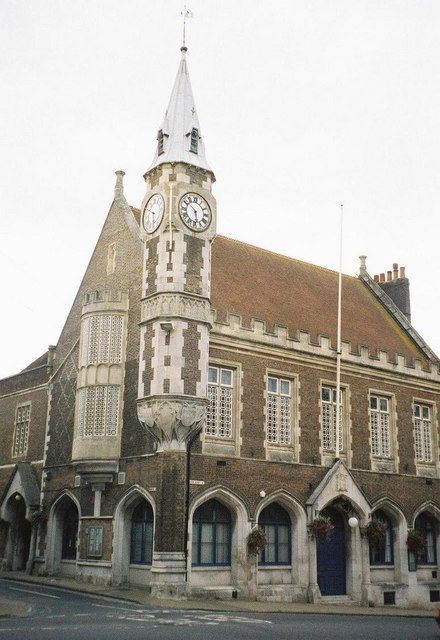
Dorchester Town Hall and Corn Exchange

- Blandford Forum Corn Exchange. Corn exchange at the rear of the town hall, facing Salisbury Street. By the architect James B. Green, of Blandford.
- Dorchester Town Hall and Corn Exchange. High West Street. 1847–1848. The town hall and the corn exchange were built together to the designs of Benjamin Ferrey in Buff Broadmayne Brick and Bath stone with the town hall above and the corn exchange below. Tudor windows over an arcade of four centred arches and a clock tower at an angle.

=== East Riding of Yorkshire ===
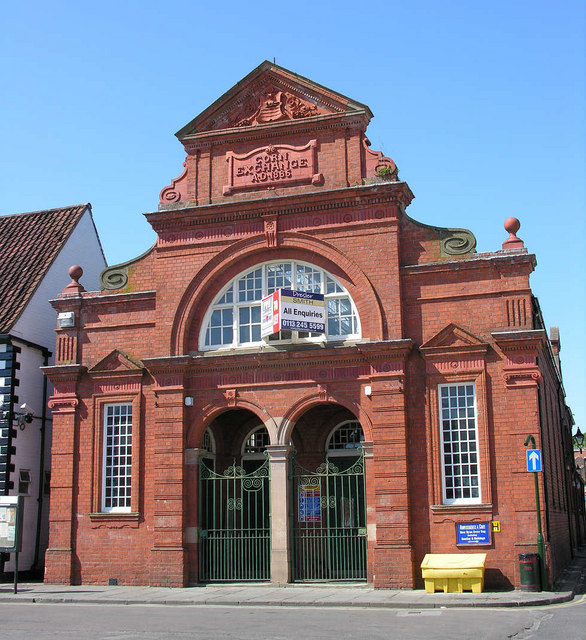
Corn Exchange, Beverley

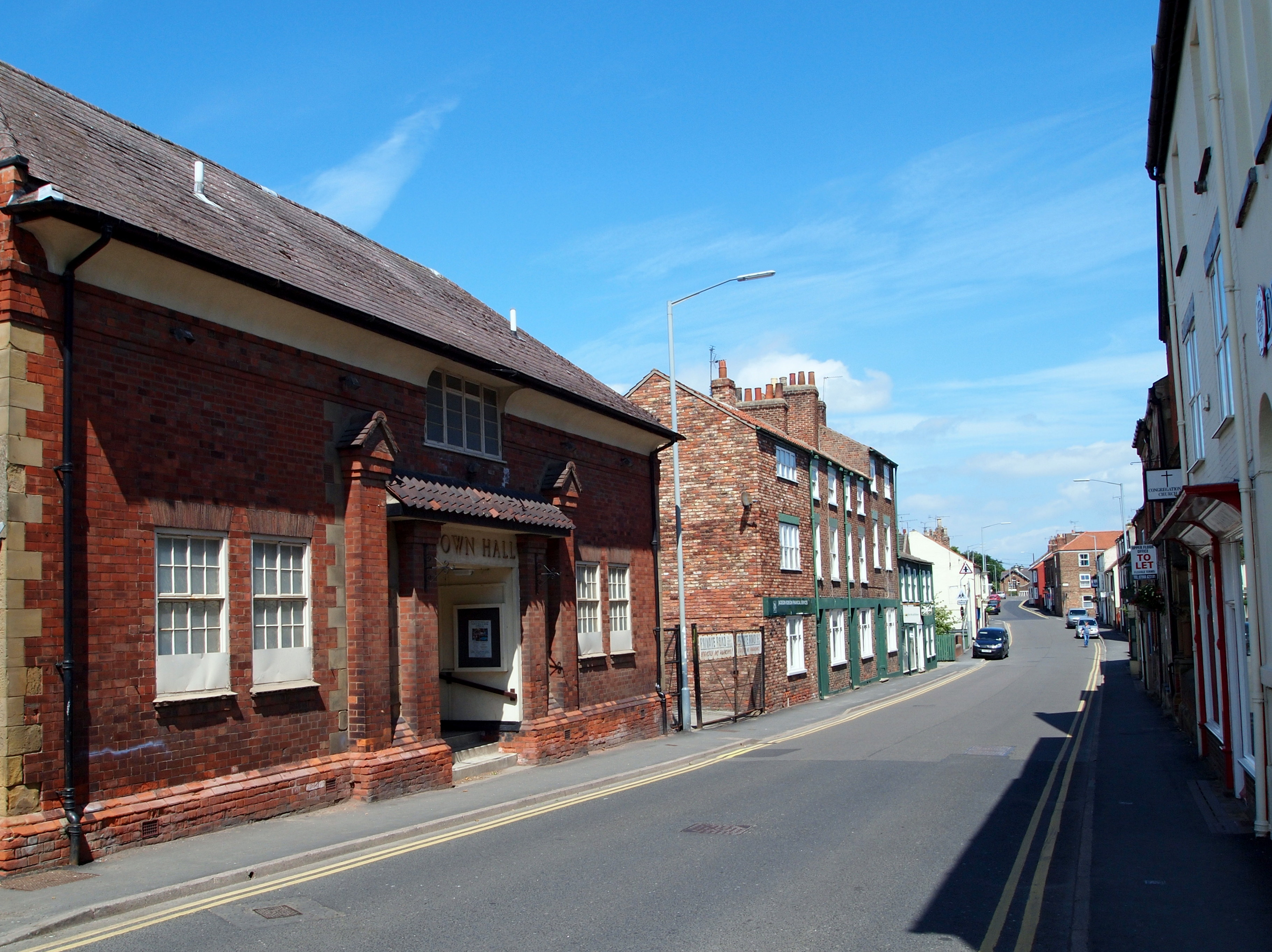
Corn Exchange, Driffield

- Beverley Corn Exchange. The building dates from 1886 and commands a view over the southern end of the Saturday Market Place. For many years it served as the "Beverley Playhouse".
- Bridlington Corn Exchange. 1824. Demolished in 1972 and replaced by Corn Exchange House.
- Driffield Corn Exchange. 1842. Later town hall and now part of The Bell Hotel.

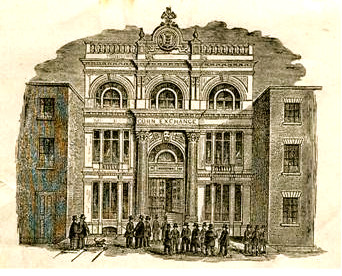
Hull Corn Exchange 1863

- Hull Corn Exchange. Now the Hull and East Riding Museum. Nikolaus Pevsner and David Neave describe this as an imposing building of 1856, with massive Italianate stone front. Three storeys, three bays with a high doorway flanked with Corinthian columns, with a large beaded mask carved on the keystone and agricultural motifs on the spandrels. Tripartite windows to first floor and big semi-circular windows to the upper floor. Cartouche with town arms on parapet. The corn exchange incorporated a huge exchange hall spanned by timber trusses supported on carved corbels. The building was little used and in disrepair by 1888 and lost more business in 1904 when the new Corn Market opened in the Market Hall, North Church Side. It closed in 1906 and some of the rooms were used as offices by companies such as the Yorkshire Farmers. During the First World War it was used to house troops. It found a new purpose in 1925 when it became the Museum of Commerce and Transport and then in 1989 the Hull and East Riding Museum.

=== East Sussex ===
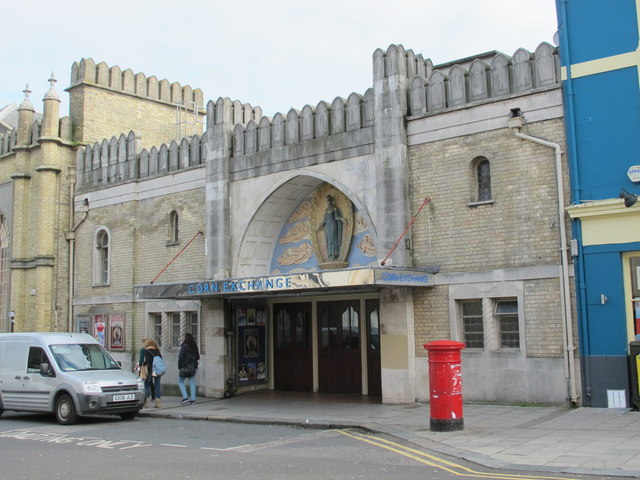
The Corn Exchange, Brighton

- Brighton Corn Exchange, Church Street. The Prince Regent's Riding school was redesignated for use as the Corn Exchange in 1868.

=== Essex ===
- Braintree, High Street. (South East Side). Built in 1839, it was enlarged between 1860 and 1877. The front is white gault brick, painted on the outer bays and plastered on the centre, Two storeys. The facade has a parapet and stucco cornice with three bays, divided by pilasters rising two storeys. The centre front breaks forward slightly above the pilasters and is recessed beneath the entablature. Now converted into a series of shops.
- Chelmsford Corn Exchange. Tindall Square. Neo-Renaissance building was designed by Fred Chancellor in 1857. It was demolished, along with the whole of the west side of Tindal Street, to make way for the High Chelmer redevelopment in 1969.

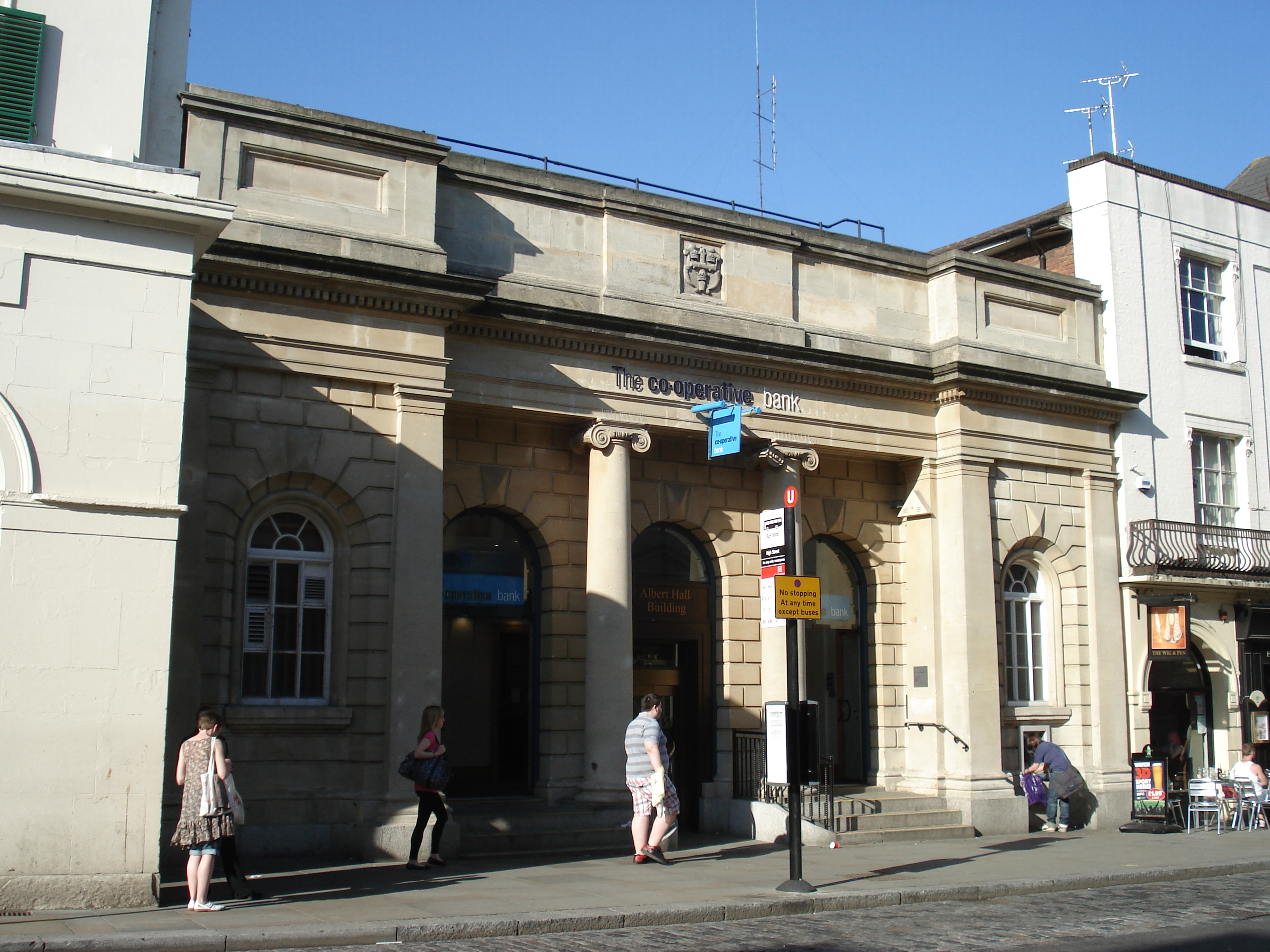
Colchester Corn Exchange 1844

- Colchester Corn Exchange. The earliest corn exchange of 1820 was by David Laing in the High Street was later the Essex and Suffolk Fire Office. Originally of two storeys with a central pediment and a third storey was added later. The colonnade has nine pairs of cast iron Greek Doric columns across the pavement. The arcade behind was enclosed in later 19th century and remodelled with plate glass in 1966. This was replaced in 1845 by a corn exchange designed by Raphael Brandon. (1844). This is now known as the Albert Hall and was reconstructed in 1925–1926 and adapted as an Art Gallery. It has a portico entrance with two Ionic columns, stucco ground floor and arched doorways.

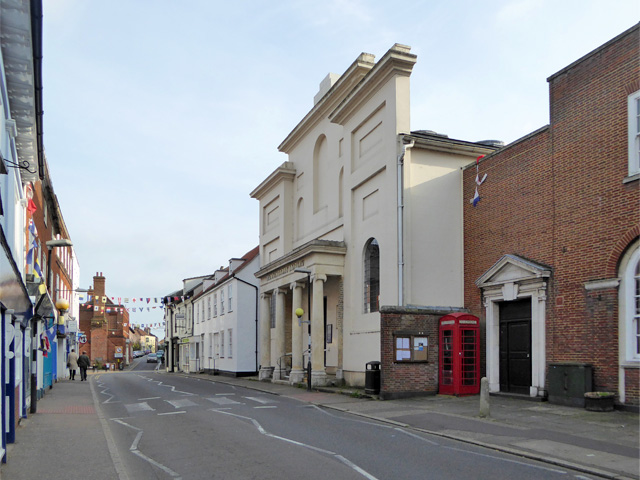
Corn Exchange, Manningtree

- Manningtree Corn Exchange. High Street. County library, and formerly church of St Michael. Grade II listed. Built as a corn exchange, circa 1865. Built at a cost of £1,600, and closed about 1875. Then became a public hall and later converted into a church by Raymond Erith, now a public library. Brick, stucco faced. Of three two storey bays, the inner raised and set back. Parapets with moulded cornices, block finial to central bay. Horizontal upper and lower vertical sunk panels to outer bays, each with a round-headed window in the lower panels. Central bay with an Ionic portico with four columns, approached by steps to central panelled double doors, square light windows to right and left.

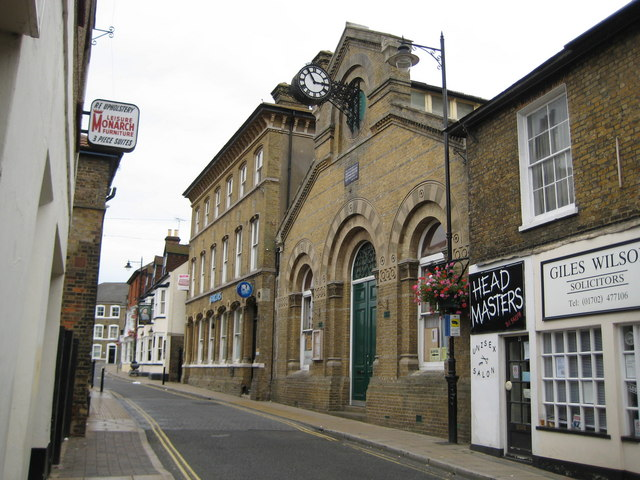
Corn Exchange, Rochford 1866

- Rochford Corn Exchange. (1866). The building fell into disuse around the beginning of the First World War, but appears to have been renovated up by the Women's Institute during the Second World War. By F. Chancellor. Striated yellow brick. A tall single storey building with a slate roof with continuous raised lights to apex with gable towards the road. Moulded and dentilled cornices, moulded stone terminals. The raised apex with side bands and roundel set within a recessed arch. An ornate wrought iron bracket supports a double faced clock commemorating Queen Victoria's Jubilee on 22 June 1892.

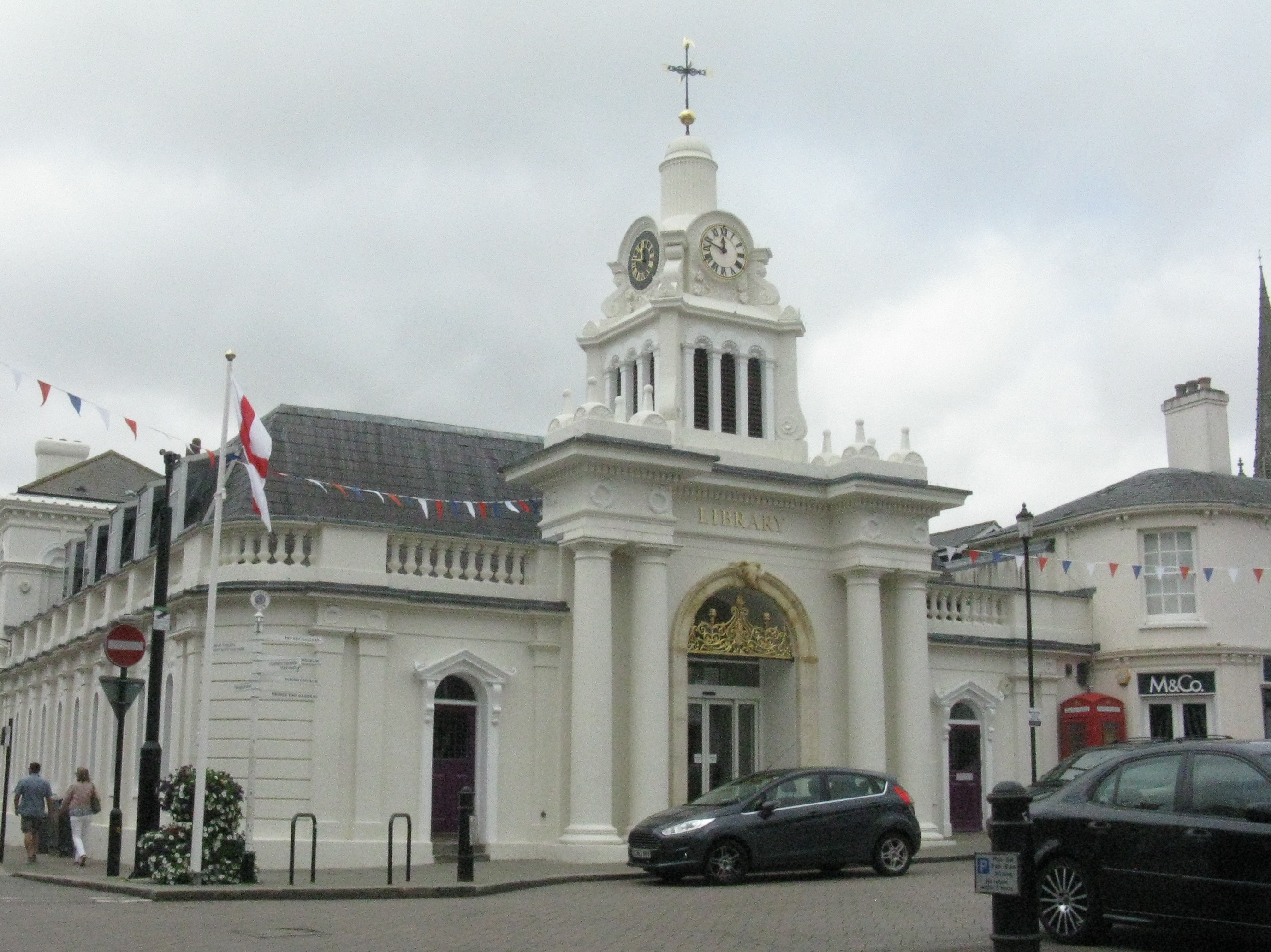
Corn Exchange, Saffron Walden

- Saffron Walden Corn Exchange. Market Place. (c. 1847). Now public library. Attributed to the architect R. Tress. Classical style with rendered brickwork and slate roof behind original balustraded parapet. Single storey. The east front elevation with central portico with symmetrical bay each side with paired pilasters and a side doorway with open pediment, consoles and acroteria, semicircular overlight. Central portico comprises a round-headed doorway with paired columns set forward each side with entablature breaking forward and decorated with paired wreaths. Parapet has paired acroteria. Clock tower on plinth with volute scrolled diagonal buttresses with acroteria clasping a louvred, triple-arcaded opening. Above, clock face with diagonal consoles, and surmounting, reeded cylindrical stage having cornice, dome and weather-vane. The doorway has a cast-iron cresting set within the arched head, central scrolls with lyre shape. Elevation to King Street with nine bays with dividing pilasters, each decorated by a panel and linked cornucopia on the frieze, and raised architrave having fleur-de-lys cresting.

=== Gloucestershire ===
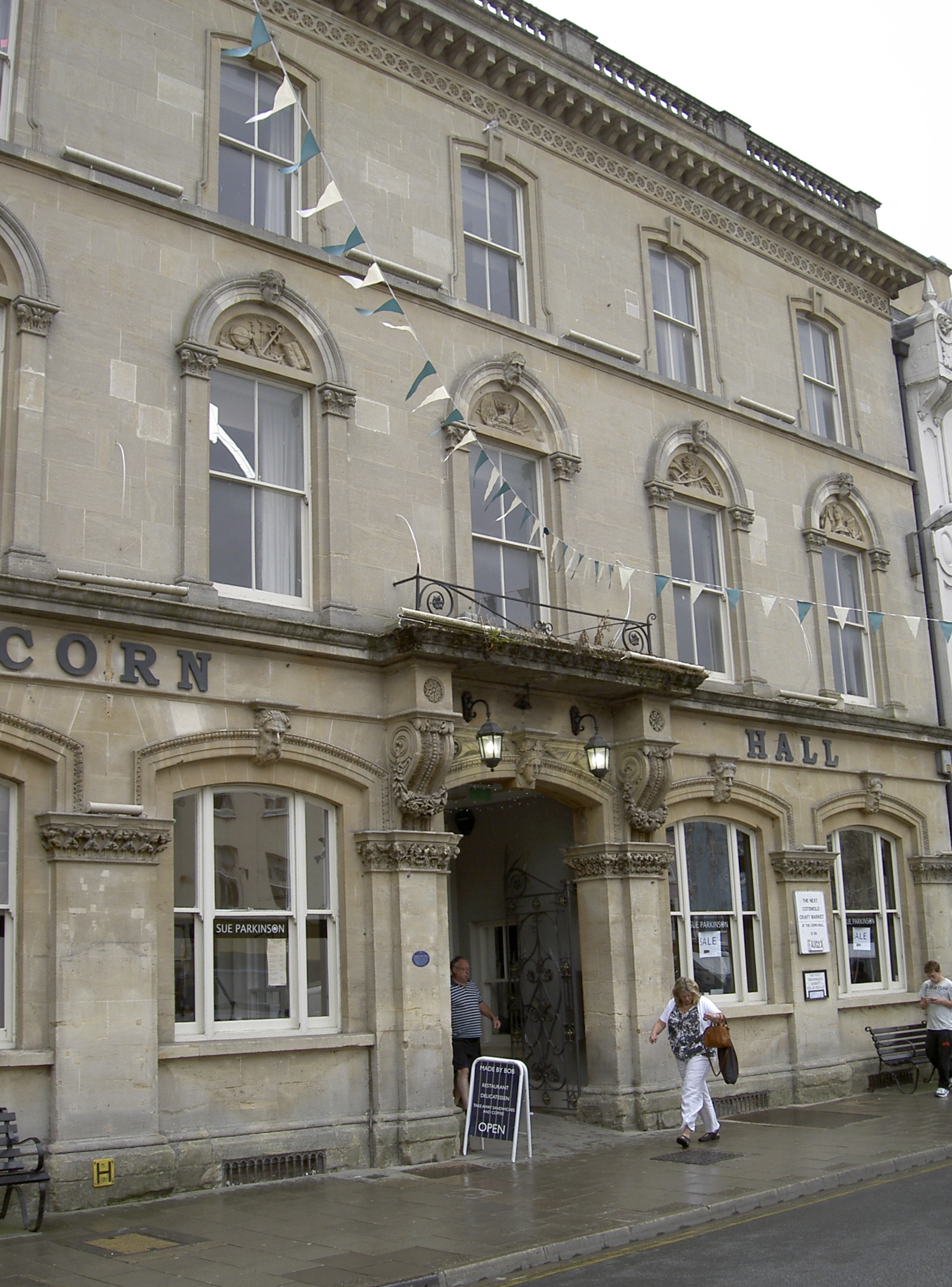
Corn Hall, Cirencester

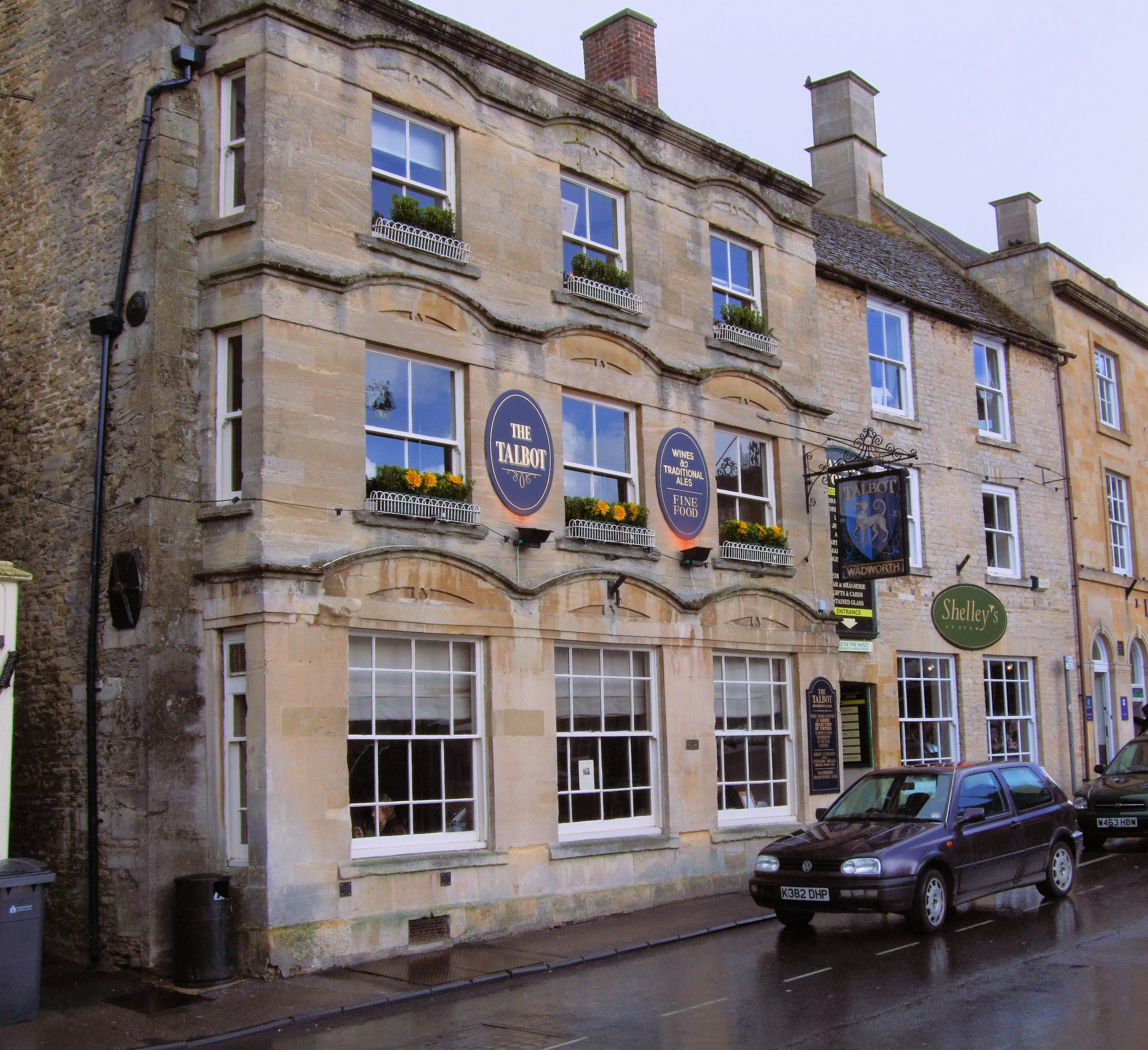
The Talbot, former corn exchange, Stow-on-the-Wold

- Cirencester Corn Hall. Corn exchange built in 1863 by Medland, Maberly and Medland to replace the old Booth Hall as the place for local business to operate. It is a Grade II listed building and is decorated with a number of interesting carved panels.
- Gloucester Corn Exchange. Southgate Street. Demolished in 1938.
- Stow-on-the-Wold Corn Exchange. The Square. Former corn exchange, now the Talbot Hotel. An 18th-century building which was remodelled about 1840 as a corn exchange. Ashlar-faced parapet, with Cotswold stone roof. It has a brass letter box for grain samples to be left.

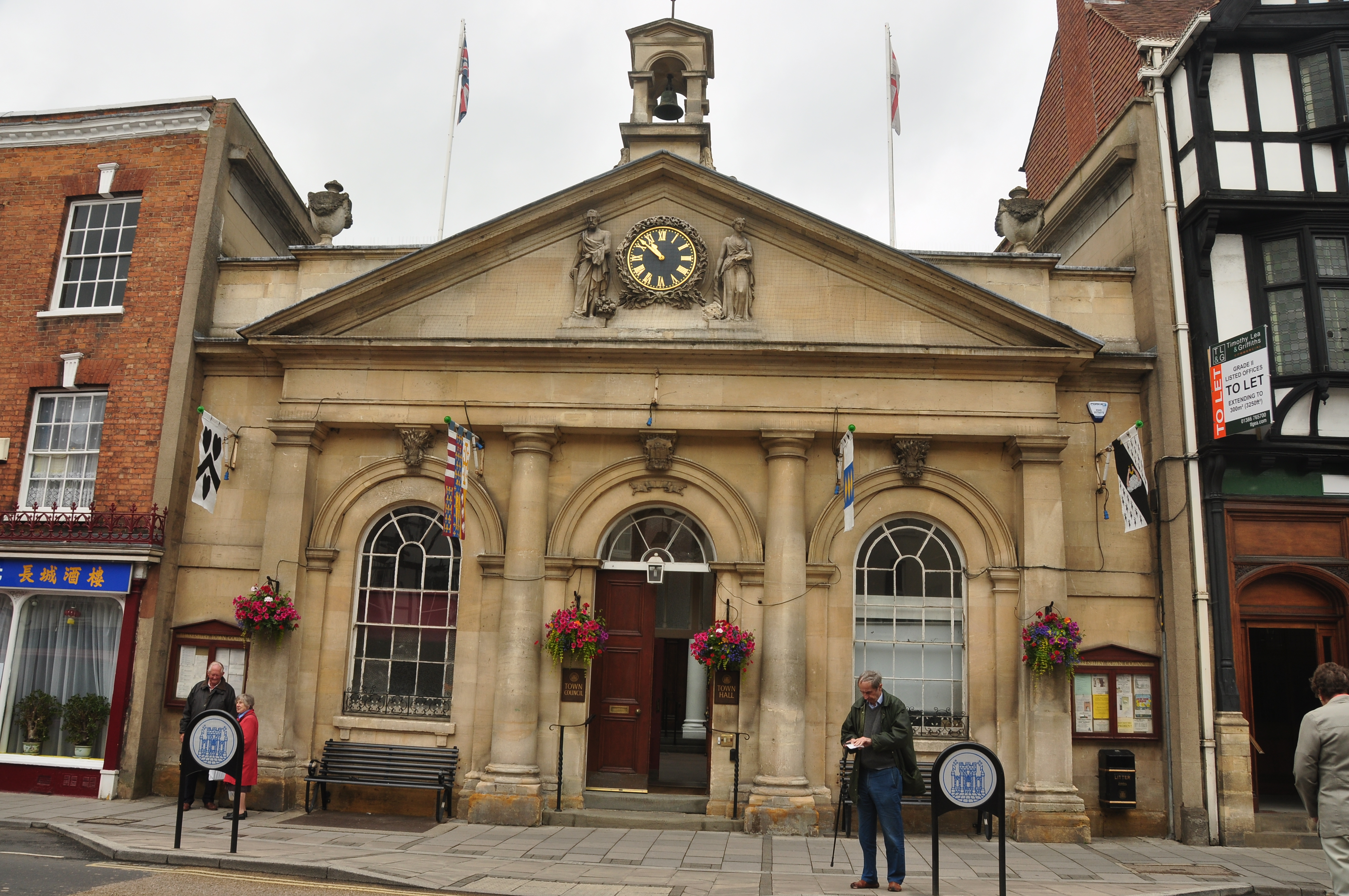
Tewkesbury Town Hall: former corn exchange, 1857

- Tewkesbury Corn Exchange. Now Tewkesbury Town Hall. The town hall was built in 1788; the original structure was a two-storey building set well back from the High Street with a corn exchange in front. One of the few stone buildings in the town, it is ashlar faced with Doric columns, a central bell tower and a clock, which is flanked by two figures, one of an agricultural worker and the other of Ceres.

=== Greater Manchester ===
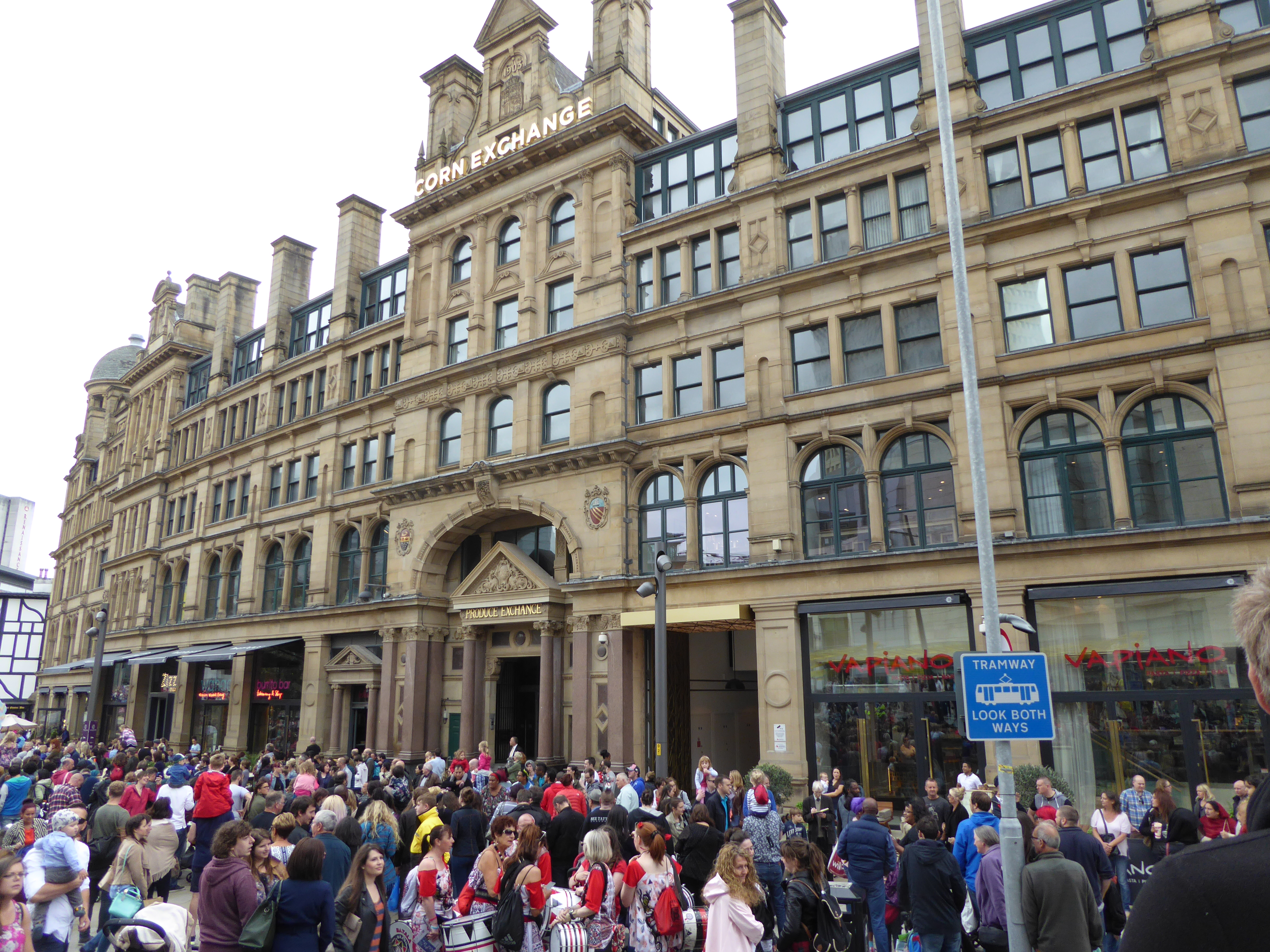
Manchester Corn Exchange

- Manchester Corn Exchange The first corn exchange built on this site in 1837 was designed by Richard Lane. This was demolished in 1897 and replaced in two sections between 1897 and 1903. Each section was designed by a different architect Following the IRA bomb in 1996 it was renovated and was a modern shopping centre till July 2014. The building was recently sold to Aviva investors and has been re-developed into a dining destination with 17 food outlets.

=== Hampshire ===
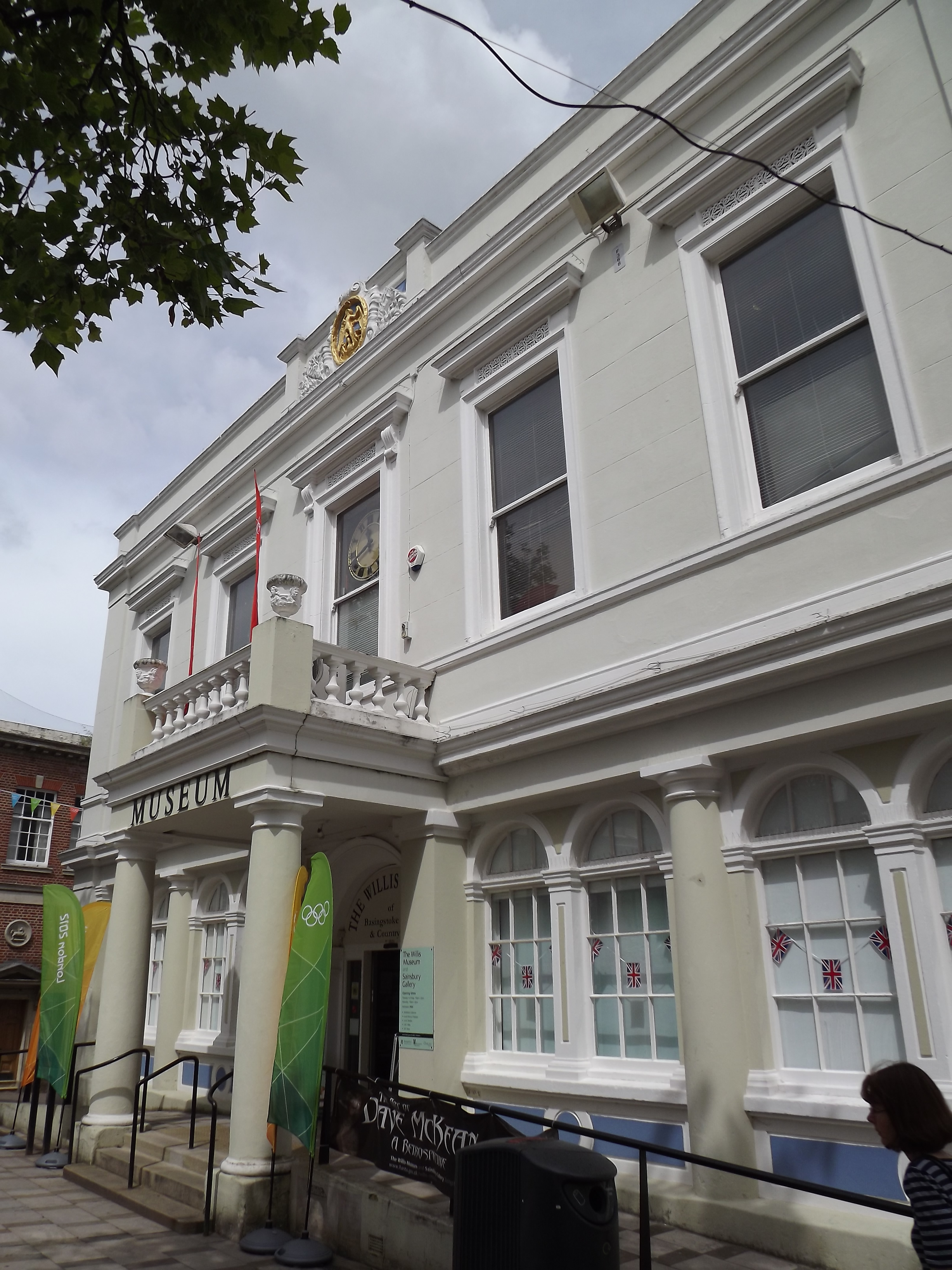
Basingstoke Town Hall and Corn Exchange

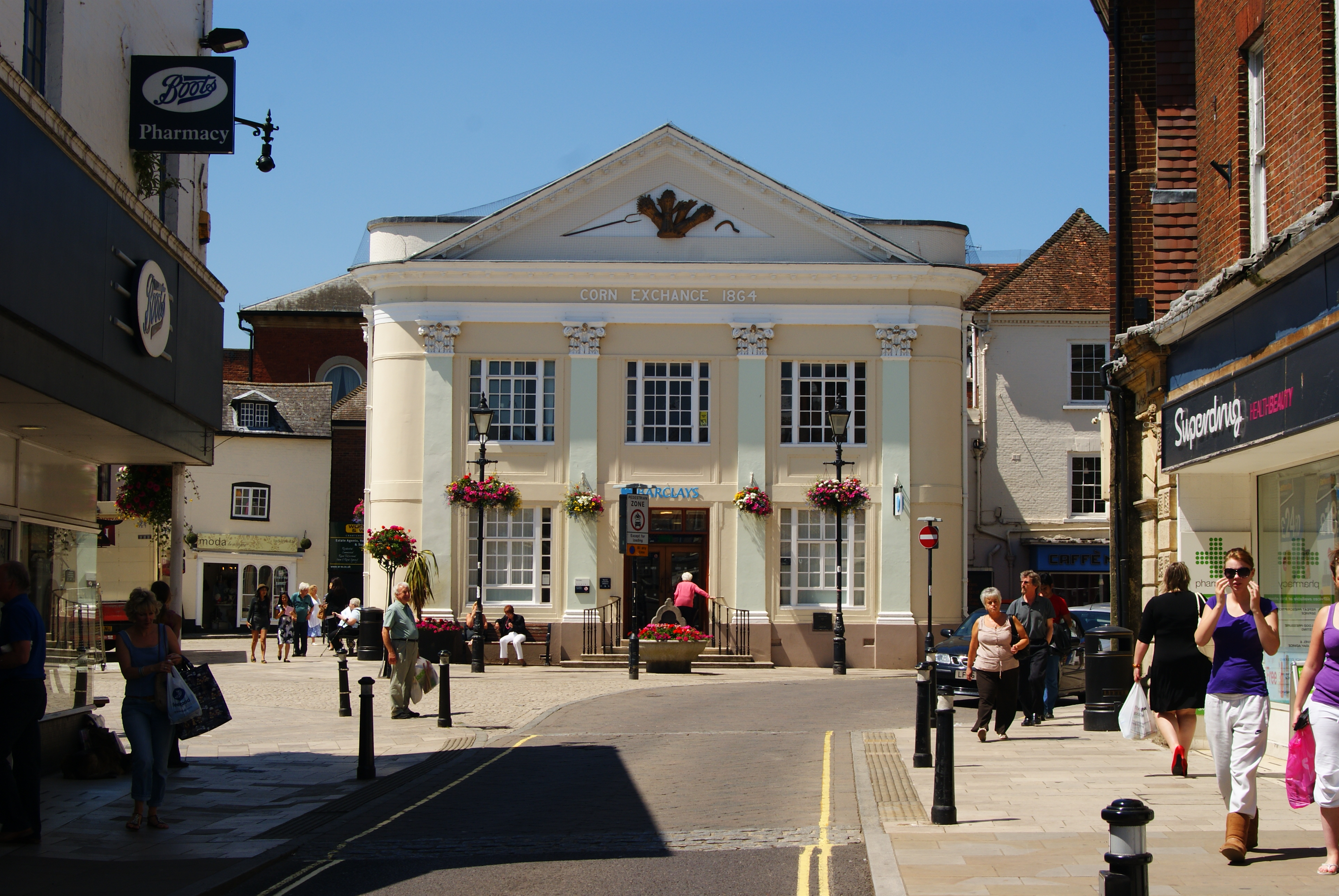
Corn Exchange, Romsey, Hampshire

- Basingstoke Town Hall and Corn Exchange, became the headquarters of Basingstoke Borough Council and is now a museum.
- Romsey Corn Exchange, Corn Market. (1864). Each front is 3 bays wide, divided by composite pilasters, with moulded entablature; stuccoed plinth. Band between 1st and ground floors. North and south fronts formerly had balustraded parapets and cornice. The east front has a central pediment with a tympanum decorated with gilded sheaves, pitchfork and sickle. Listed Grade II*.
- Winchester Corn Exchange, became a library and is now known as "The Arc".

=== Herefordshire ===
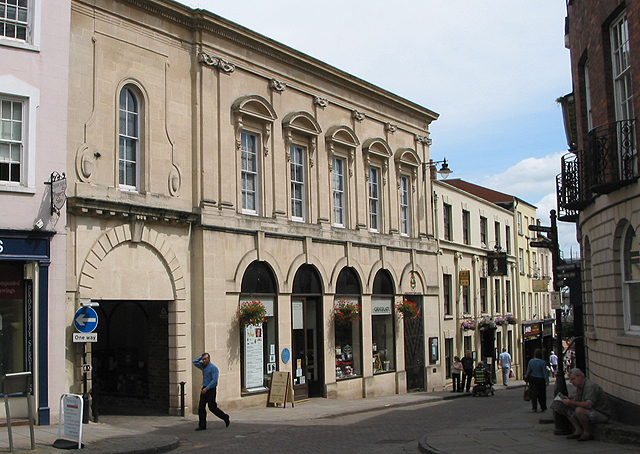
Corn Exchange, Ross-on-Wye 1862

- Hereford. Broad Street. 1858. Demolished in the early 1870s and replaced by the Library and Council Offices.
- Leominster Corn Exchange. By Mr. Cranston [sic], of Birmingham (likely James Cranstoun). Demolished in the 1970s.
- Ross-on-Wye Corn Exchange. 1862. High Street. Designed by Thomas Nicholson.

=== Hertfordshire ===
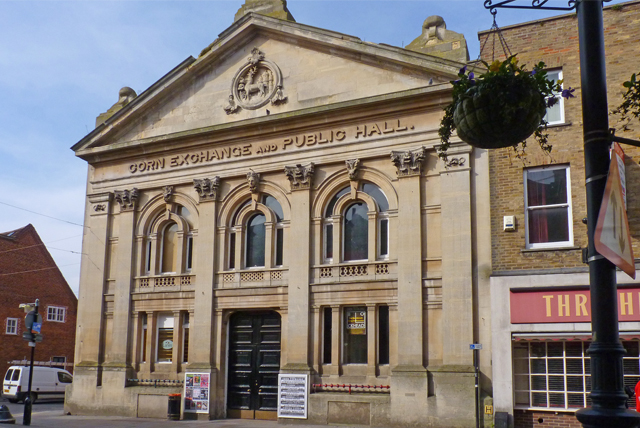
Corn Exchange, Hertford

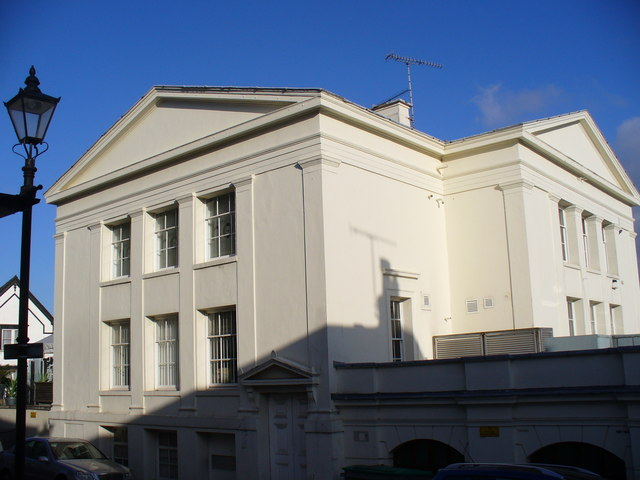
Corn Exchange, Bishop's Stortford 1828

- Bishop's Stortford Corn Exchange. 1828. In Grecian Revival style by Lewis Vulliamy.
- Hertford Corn Exchange. Corn exchange reconstructed by William Hill of Leeds.

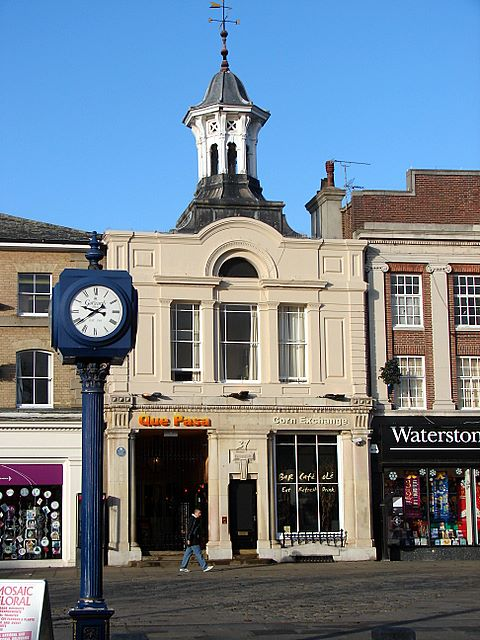
Corn Exchange, Hitchin 1853

- Hitchin Corn Exchange, 31 Market Place, Hitchin (1853) It was built at a cost of £2000, and designed by William Beck, a local architect. On market days the corn exchange was filled with up to 30 tables, and corn dealers and seedman hired the tables. The "Market Company" helped with the running costs and leased the market tolls from the Crown for 31 years. In December 1941 the corn exchange was opened as a British Restaurant, and catered for 600 people a day. By the 1950s and 1960s, the building was used as a skating rink. During the 1980s and 1990s, the corn exchange became a craft and antique centre and later became a popular venue. There were plenty of stalls selling arts and crafts, and a small café, a bar and night club, known as Que Pasa.
- Royston Corn Exchange, Market Hill. (1829) Built in moulded yellow bricks patented by Caleb Hitch. One storey with hipped slated roof. Hollow rectangle plan. West front central doorway leads through to courtyard with covered walk under wide roof eaves on cast iron posts.

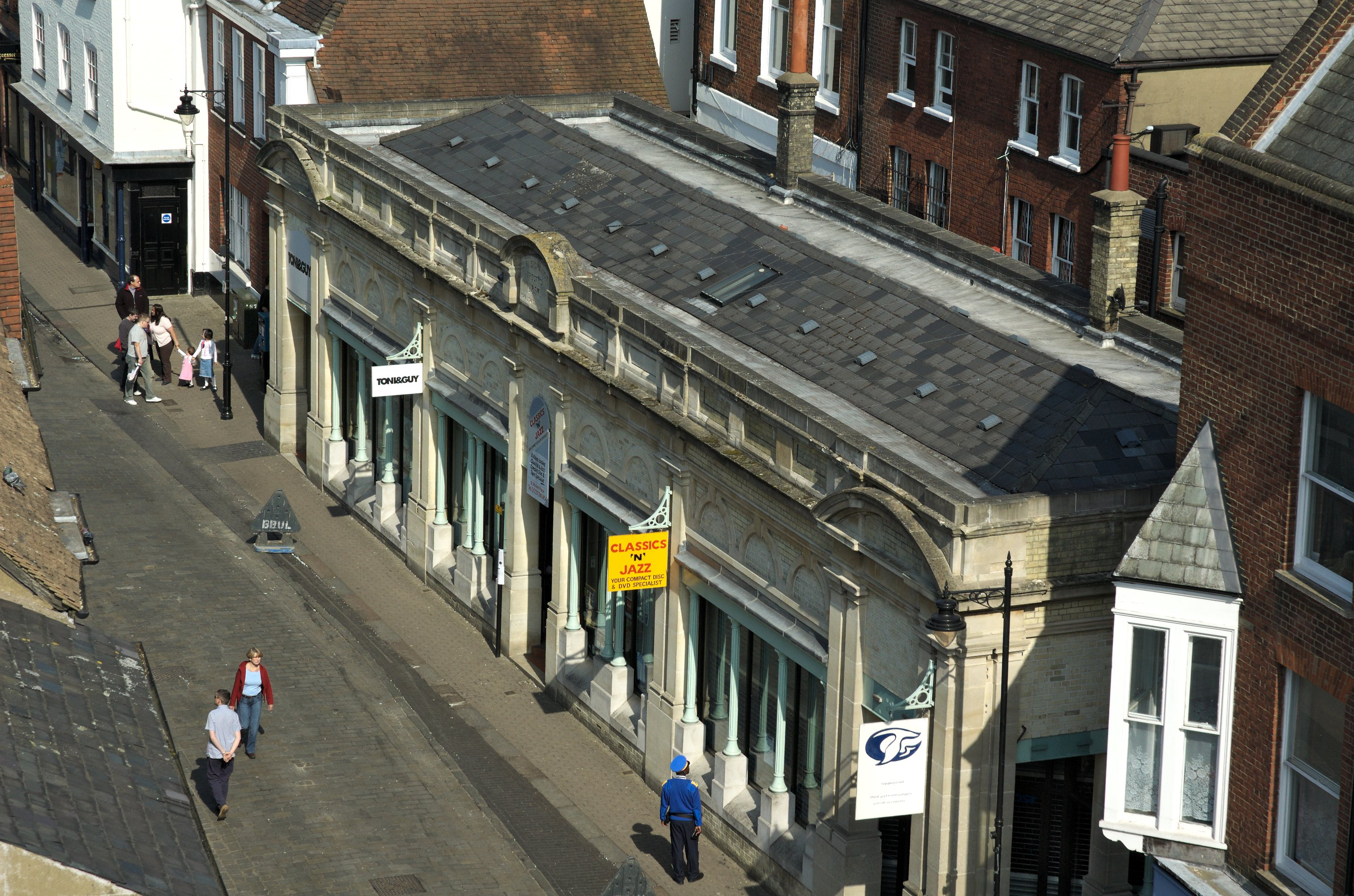
Corn Exchange, St Albans, 1857

- St Albans Corn Exchange by James Murray, of Coventry, and later of the firm of Pugin & Murray, of London. From design selected in a competition in 1854, and carried out in the Italian style "with details partaking of the Romanesque".
- Watford Corn Exchange. Designed by John Murray. The corn exchange and market house belonging to Watford Corporation was burnt down in June 1853 and the contents, consisting of 90 quarters of wheat, 100 quarters of oats, and a considerable quantity of barley, and other produce, destroyed. The new corn exchange was completed in 1855 and later became the Kinetic Cinema. Since demolished.

=== Kent ===
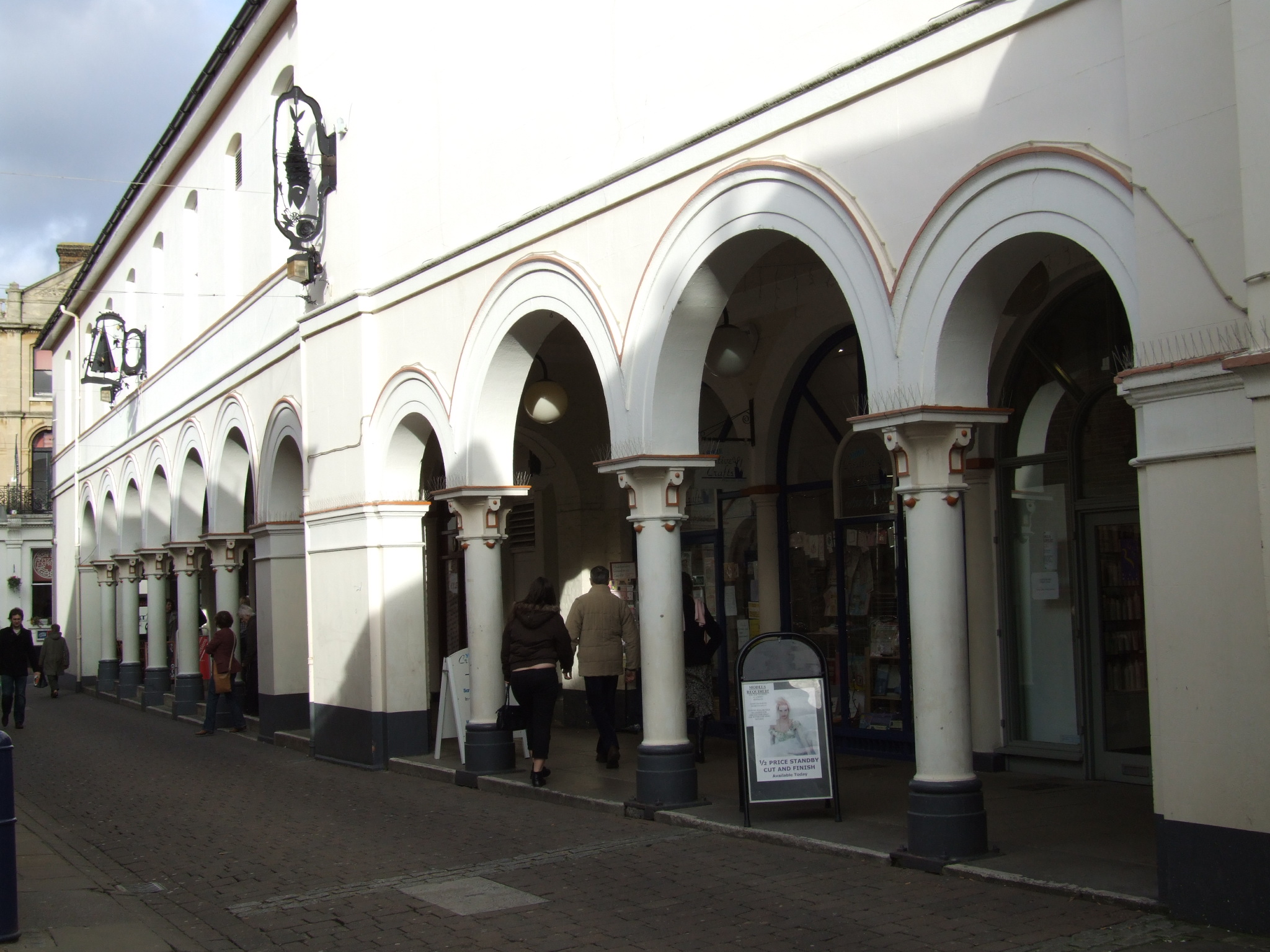
Maidstone Corn Exchange 1835

- Maidstone Corn Exchange. Corn exchange of 1835 by John Whichcord Sr., the Kent County Surveyor. Two storeyed stuccoed building with a parapet and coping with raised panels at intervals. The ground floor has a colonnade of seven round-headed arches flanked by engaged Tuscan columns with keystones above each arch. The centre portion has four round-headed arches with blanks above and the left hand side has six cambered sashes and two blanks with seven round-headed arches. Now converted into a shopping arcade.

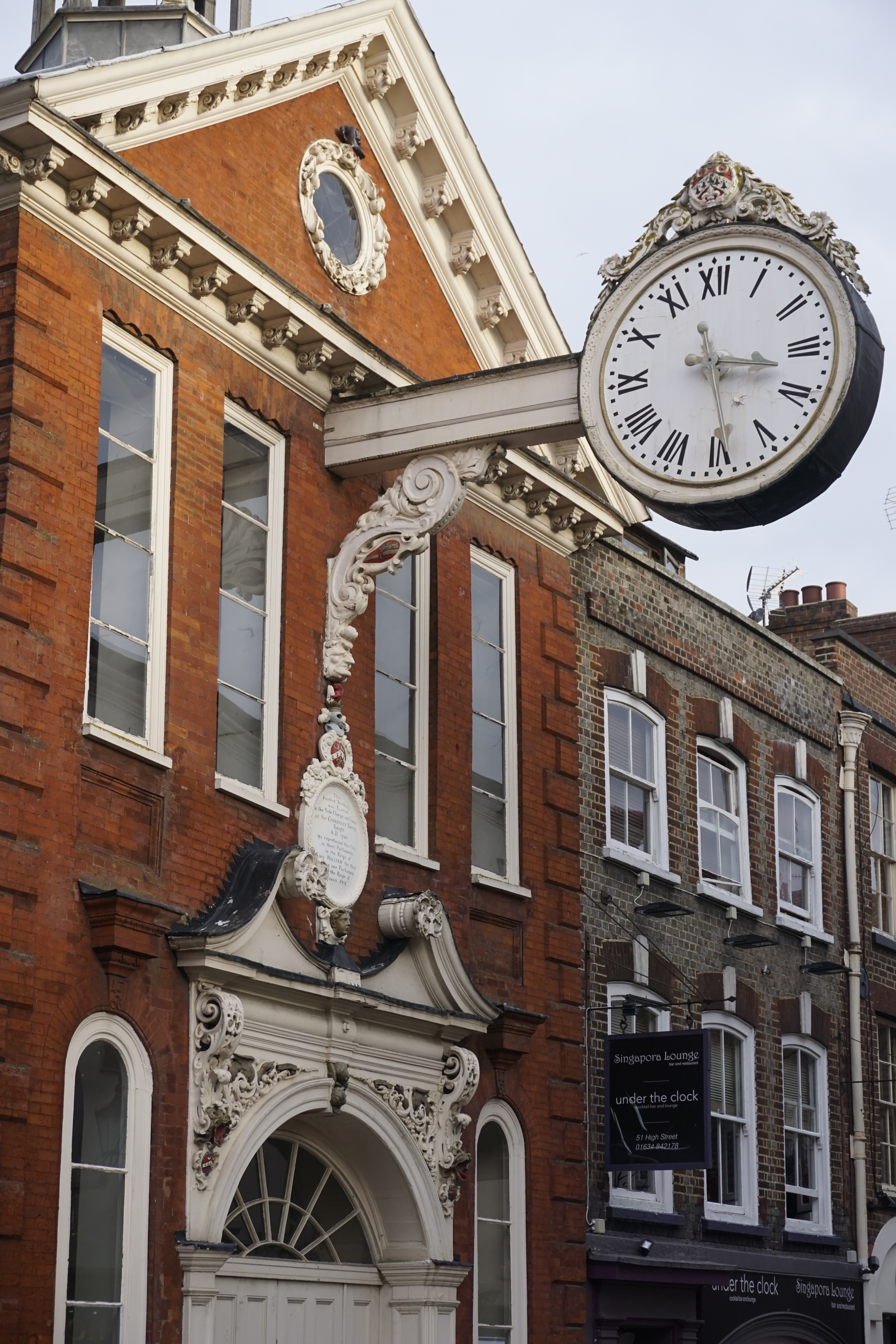
Corn Exchange, Rochester

- Rochester Corn Exchange. Early 18th-century corn exchange, later extended with the ground floor converted into a library.

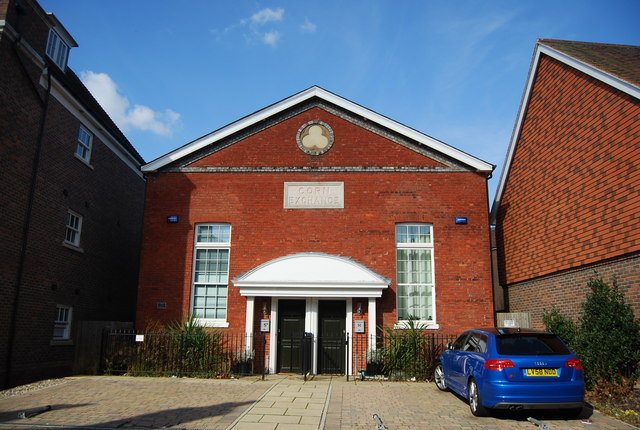
Tonbridge Corn Exchange

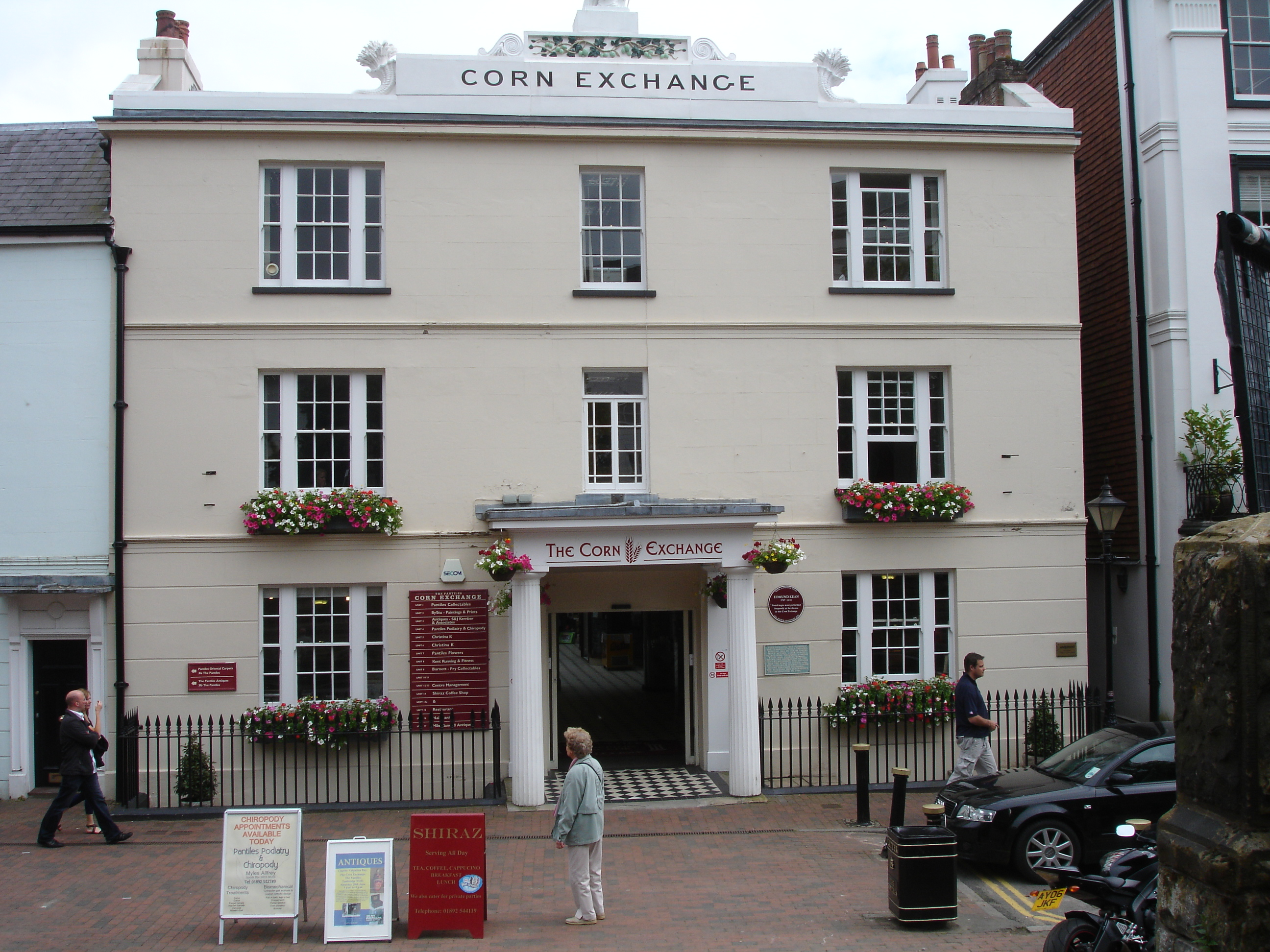
Corn Exchange, Tunbridge Wells

- Sittingbourne Corn Exchange in Central Avenue later became the town hall. 1858 by J H Andrews. Described in 1969 as "Debased classical, with a porch cum clock tower cutting into the shaped gable." This has now been demolished and replaced by a branch of NatWest Bank.
- Tonbridge Corn Exchange. Former chapel that was converted into a corn exchange.
- Tunbridge Wells Corn Exchange Originally built as a theatre in 1802. Three-storey stuccoed building with the ground floor rusticated. Parapet with solid panel in the centre, flanked by cornucopias and surmounted by the statue of a female figure with scythe and sheaf of corn. Cornice above each floor. The porch has two fluted Doric columns and plain pilasters.

=== Lancashire ===
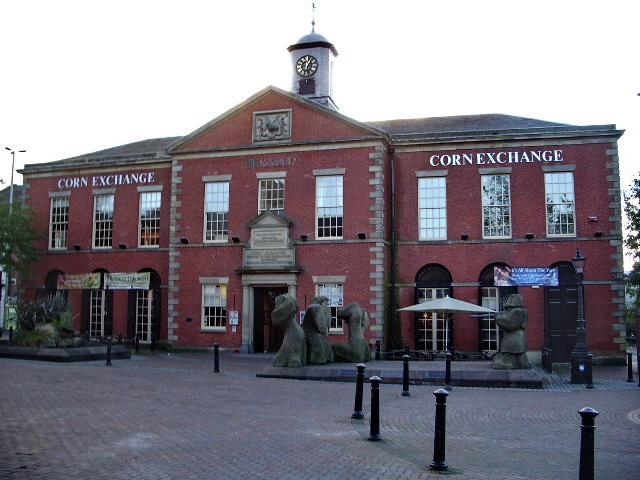
Preston Corn Exchange, 1824

- Preston Corn Exchange, Lune Street. The corn exchange with assembly rooms was built in 1822–1824, close to the original terminus of the Lancaster Canal. Red brick laid in Flemish bond, with sandstone dressings and a slate roof. Almost rectangular plan (slightly tapered towards the rear) formed by four ranges of building which enclosed an open area. The two-storey entrance block is a symmetrical range with a pedimented centre breaking forwards, with angle-quoins, a plinth, impost bands to the side ranges and at first floor a sill-band, plain frieze and moulded cornice. The centre has a doorway with a Tuscan door-case surmounted by two superimposed plaques under a pediment, with raised lettering CORN EXCHANGE - ERECTED BY THE CORPORATION - MDCCCXXII [1822] - NICHOLAS GRIMSHAW ESQr MAYOR and ENLARGED AND RESTORED / MDCCCLXXXII [1882] / EDMUND BIRLEY ESQre MAYOR. It was remodelled as a public hall 1881–1882 and closed in 1972. The structure behind the façade was demolished in 1986, and subsequently rebuilt and it now operates as a public house.

=== Leicestershire ===
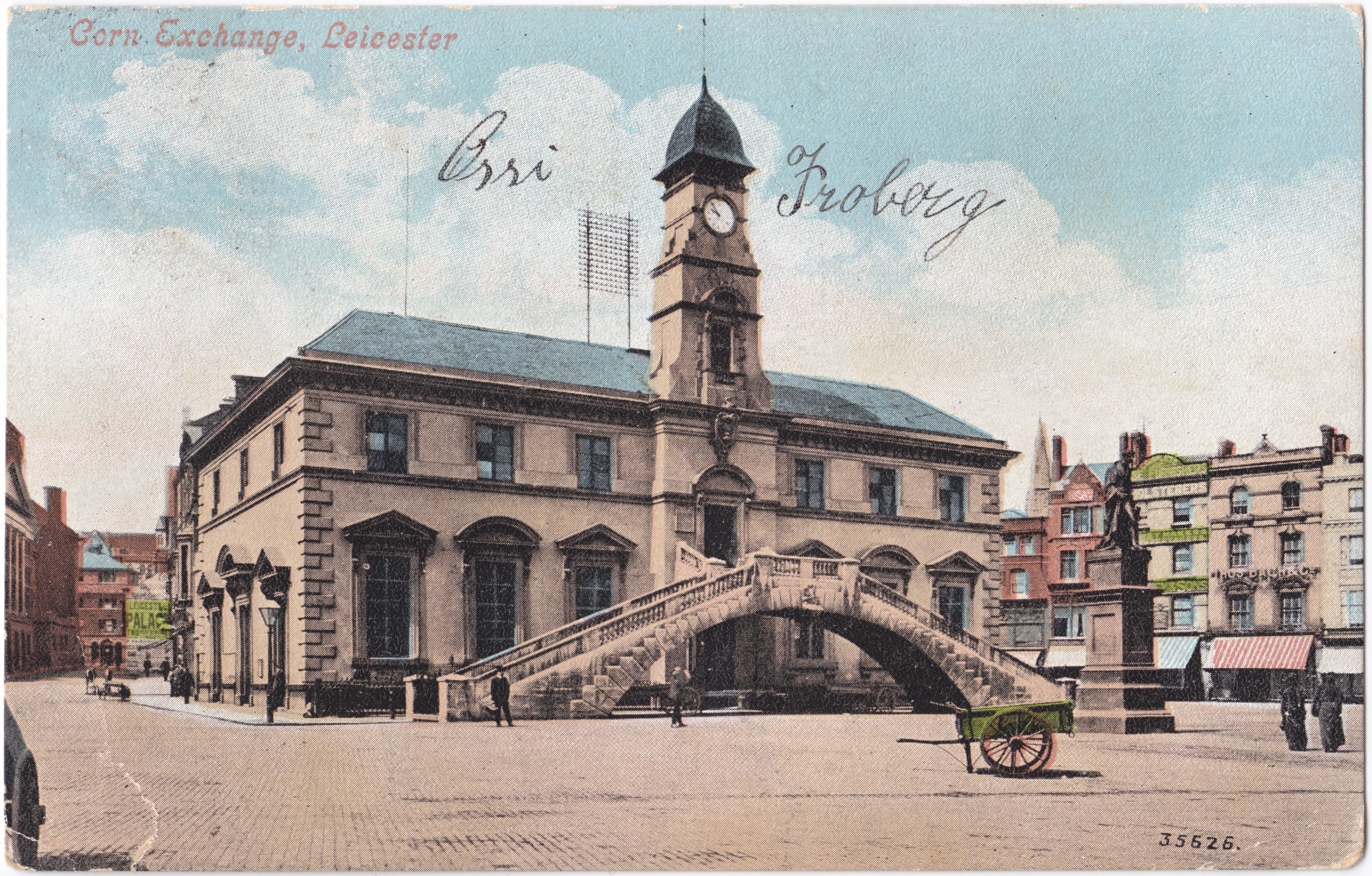
Leicester Corn Exchange c1906

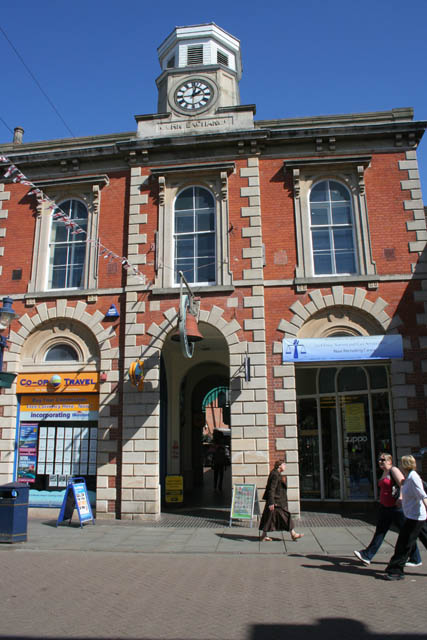
Corn Exchange, Melton Mowbray 1854

- Leicester Corn Exchange. Market Square. The ground floor was built as a corn exchange to the designs of William Flint in 1850. The upper floor was added in 1855 by F.W. Ordish to house the Magistrates courts with access by a stone-clad staircase-cum-bridge leading to a central upper doorway above which rises a tall tower.
- Melton Mowbray Corn Exchange. 1854. Now part of the Bell shopping centre. Italianate design, this red brick and stone corn exchange. Central polygonal turret above the clock is made of wood, and the 1st-floor windows are notable for their round-arched sashes.

=== Lincolnshire ===
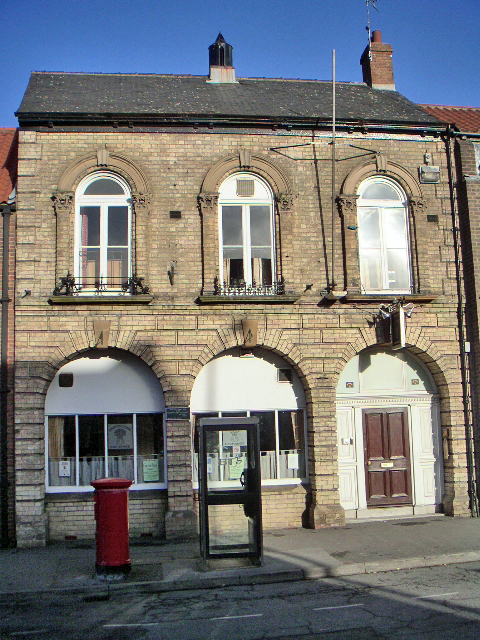
Corn Exchange, Barton-upon-Humber

- Alford Corn Exchange, Market Square. Built in 1856 at a cost of £1,400, the building bears the Hamilton family motto "Ride Through". The corn exchange is a Grade II listed building. The building is now owned by East Lindsey District Council and leased to Alford Town Council who currently manage the building. Pevsner considered this a drab building.
- Barton-upon-Humber Corn Exchange, Market Place.(1854) By D.W. Aston of Hull. Italianate, with three-bay rusticated arcade and round arched windows above.

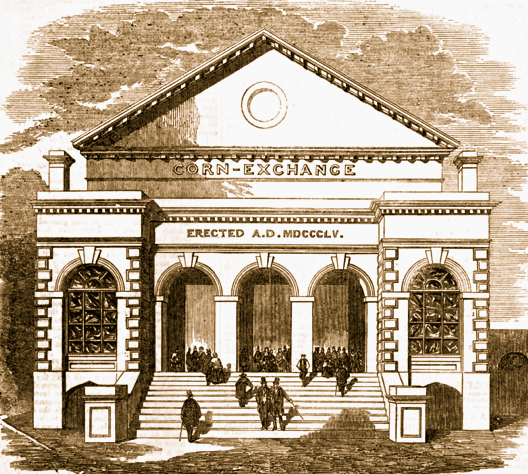
Boston. Corn exchange, 1855

- Boston. 1855. Possibly by Bellamy and Hardy. Classical facade. The corn exchange and Atheneum were demolished c. 1955 to make way for a Marks & Spencer store.
- Bourne Corn Exchange. 3 Abbey Road. 1870. Built for the Bourne Public Hall and Corn Exchange Company Limited. The architect was Charles Bell of London and the contract for the construction work went to Robert Young of Lincoln in May 1870, after his tender of £1,150 was accepted. Construction work was carried out during the summer months and the corn market opened for business in October. The controlling company was wound up in June 1938 when it was sold to Bourne Urban District Council. In the local government reorganisation of 1974 ownership passed to South Kesteven District Council. The Corn exchange was substantially extended and rebuilt in 1990.
- Brigg Corn Exchange. 1849. Market Place. Demolished in the late 20th century.

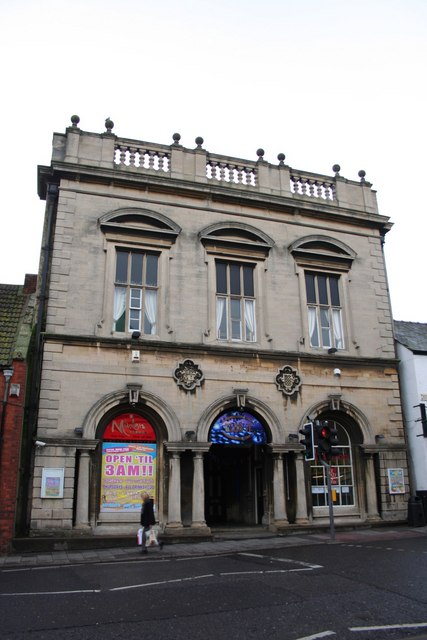
Corn Exchange, Grantham, 1852

- Grantham Corn Exchange. Westgate. Corn exchange of 1852. By Anthony Salvin. Stone-faced, three spacious bays, the ground floor with Tuscan columns. The upper floor with large pedimented windows and surmounted with a balustrade.

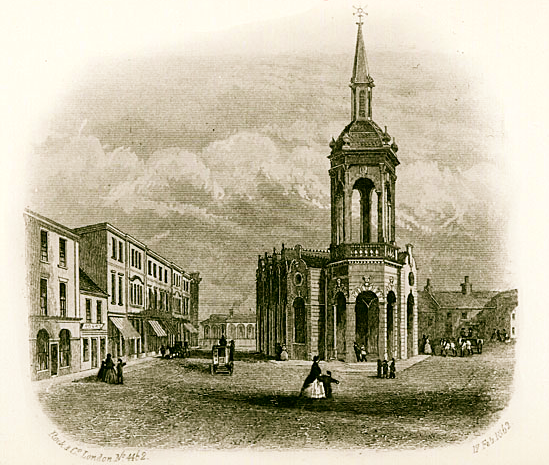
Grimsby Corn Exchange 1862

- Grimsby. Constructed of red brick and dressed stone. The plans for the building project were set in place by Grimsby Borough in 1855 and £6,000 was set aside for the building, land and expenses. Bellamy and Hardy won the open competition for the design and were paid £150 to oversee the building's construction, which cost £3,429, with the balance of the £6,000 going to the previous owner of the site. 6 March 1857 saw the official opening which was marked by a civic dinner. The building was demolished in 1960.
- Horncastle. High Street. Corn exchange by Maugham and Fowler (1855). Erected in 1856 at a cost of about £3,500, was a handsome edifice of brick with stone facings, and included a newsroom, a mechanics' institute with a library, and a hall for assemblies, concerts, and lectures. It was later converted into the Victory Cinema and then demolished in the 1970s.

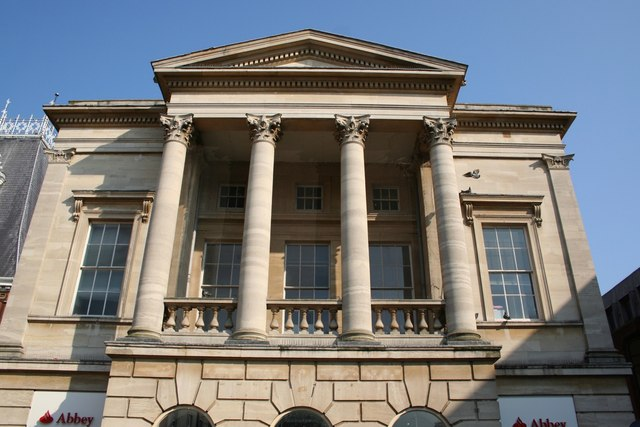
Exchange Arcade, Lincoln 1847

- Exchange Arcade, Lincoln by William Adams Nicholson. The foundation stone was laid in 1847; now converted into shops.

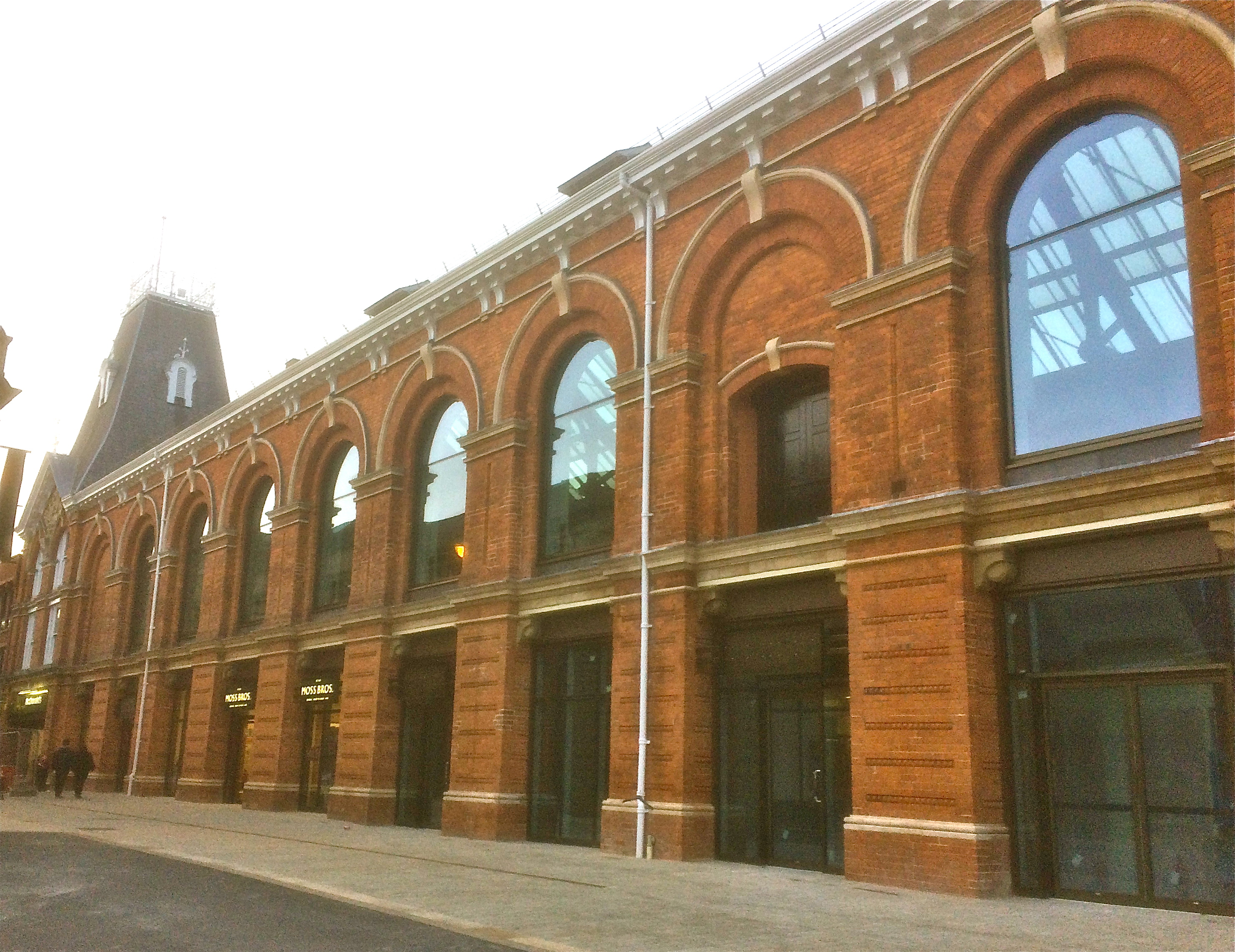
Corn Exchange, Lincoln by Bellamy and Hardy

- Lincoln Corn Exchange. Later corn exchange by Bellamy and Hardy. 1879. Corn Hill: Sincil Street. This replaced the earlier corn exchange which now had insufficient room for all the market traders. As originally designed the corn exchange was on the first floor and the ground floor was an open area used by other market traders. Red brick with round arched panels. It has a French mansard roof, typical of Bellamy and Hardy's work, with ironwork cresting. Inside, on the first floor, a large room, which was the main trading floor, has an impressive hammer beam roof. While the building was also used for other purposes, trading in corn continued until 1984. Renovation in 2017 has seen the insertion of large plate glass windows into the arched brick arcades on the south and east sides of the trading floor.

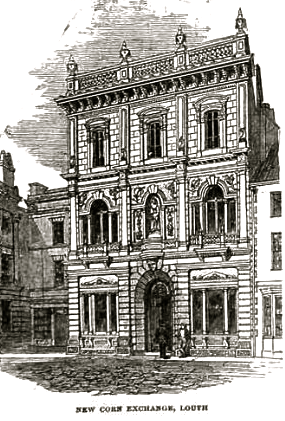
Louth Corn Exchange, 1853–1855

- Louth Corn Exchange, Market Place. By Bellamy and Hardy 1853–1855. Described by Pevsner in 1964 as "wonderfully decayed" with its facade looking like a rotting cadaver. Italianate, with a statue of Ceres in the middle. It was demolished in 1981 as the stone facade had reached an advanced state of decay.
- Long Sutton Market House and Corn Exchange, 9-11 Market Street, 1857. By Bellamy and Hardy. Large two storey red and yellow brick corn exchange. Four bays with arched windows on the first floor, with stone pediments on scroll brackets. The lower floor is now filled in with arched windows. The windows are surrounded by red brick, which contrasts with brown and yellow brick. After the First World War it became the Exchange Garage and later a stonemasons' workshop. In 1999 it was acquired by the South Holland District Council and it has subsequently been renovated.

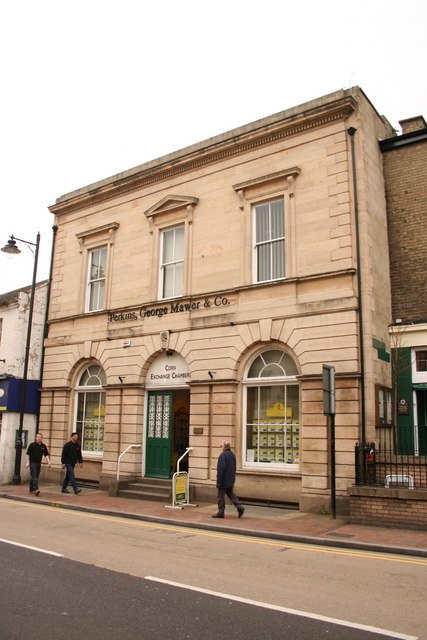
Corn Exchange, Market Rasen 1854

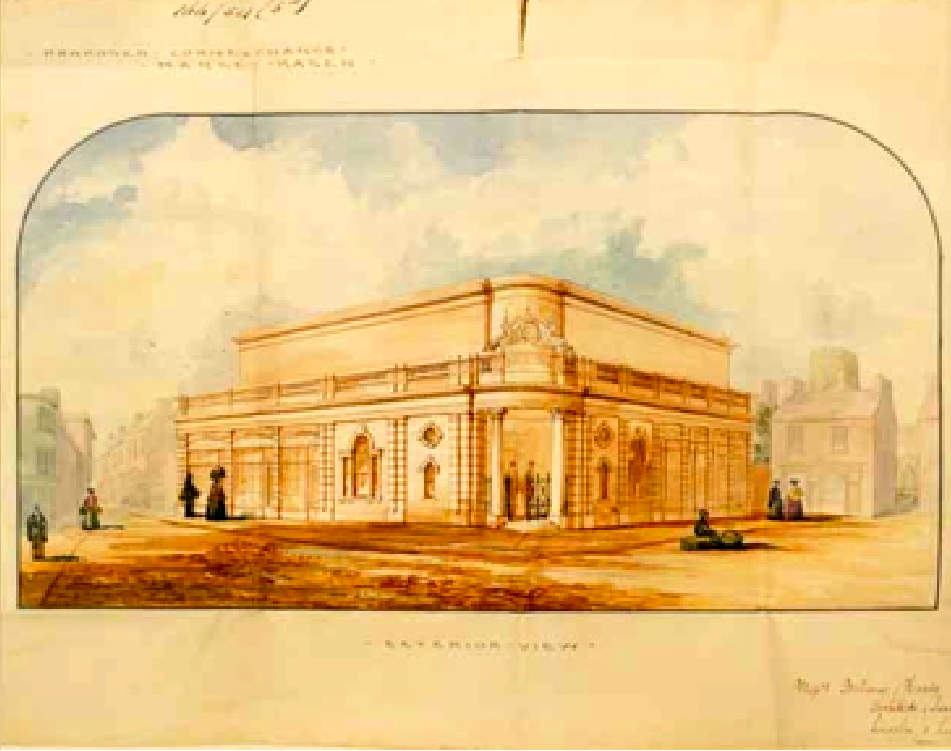
Rival Corn Exchange, Market Rasen 1854

- Market Rasen Corn Exchange. Market Rasen had two corn exchanges. A building in Queen Street, designed by Henry Goddard of Lincoln in the Italianate style, went ahead in 1854. However, a rival faction went ahead at the same time with a market hall designed by Bellamy and Hardy on the corner of the Market Place with the High Street: the original drawing for this survives. The drawing shows a building with a corner portico and Doric columns and Venetian windows on two sides of the building. The building was modified when built and there was an open cupola over the portico. This building opened in September 1854. The two corn exchanges were merged in 1856 and the Market Place building became a Market Hall. For a time it was used as a town hall and in 1914 it was converted into the Picturedrome cinema. It was demolished in 1960.

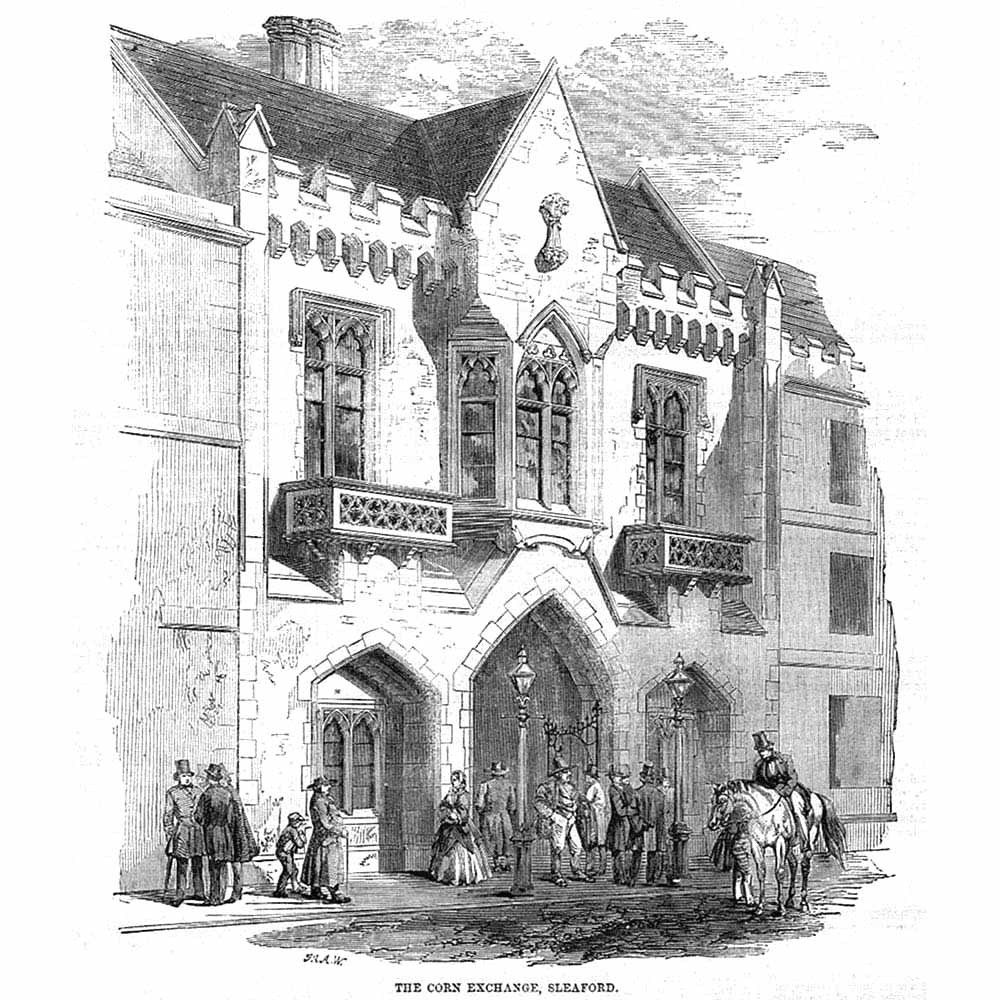
Sleaford Corn Exchange 1859

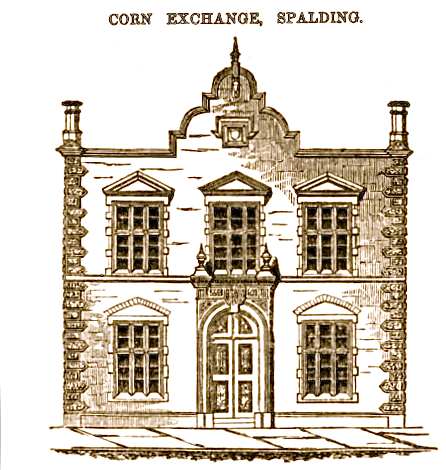
Spalding Corn Exchange 1855

- Sleaford Corn Exchange. Limestone Corn Exchange built in Tudor Gothic style by Kirk and Parry 1859. Sleaford Corn Exchange occupied the site of 19 Market Place. It comprised the main exchange building at ground floor level, an extensive basement butter market and other ancillary accommodation. It was demolished in 1964.

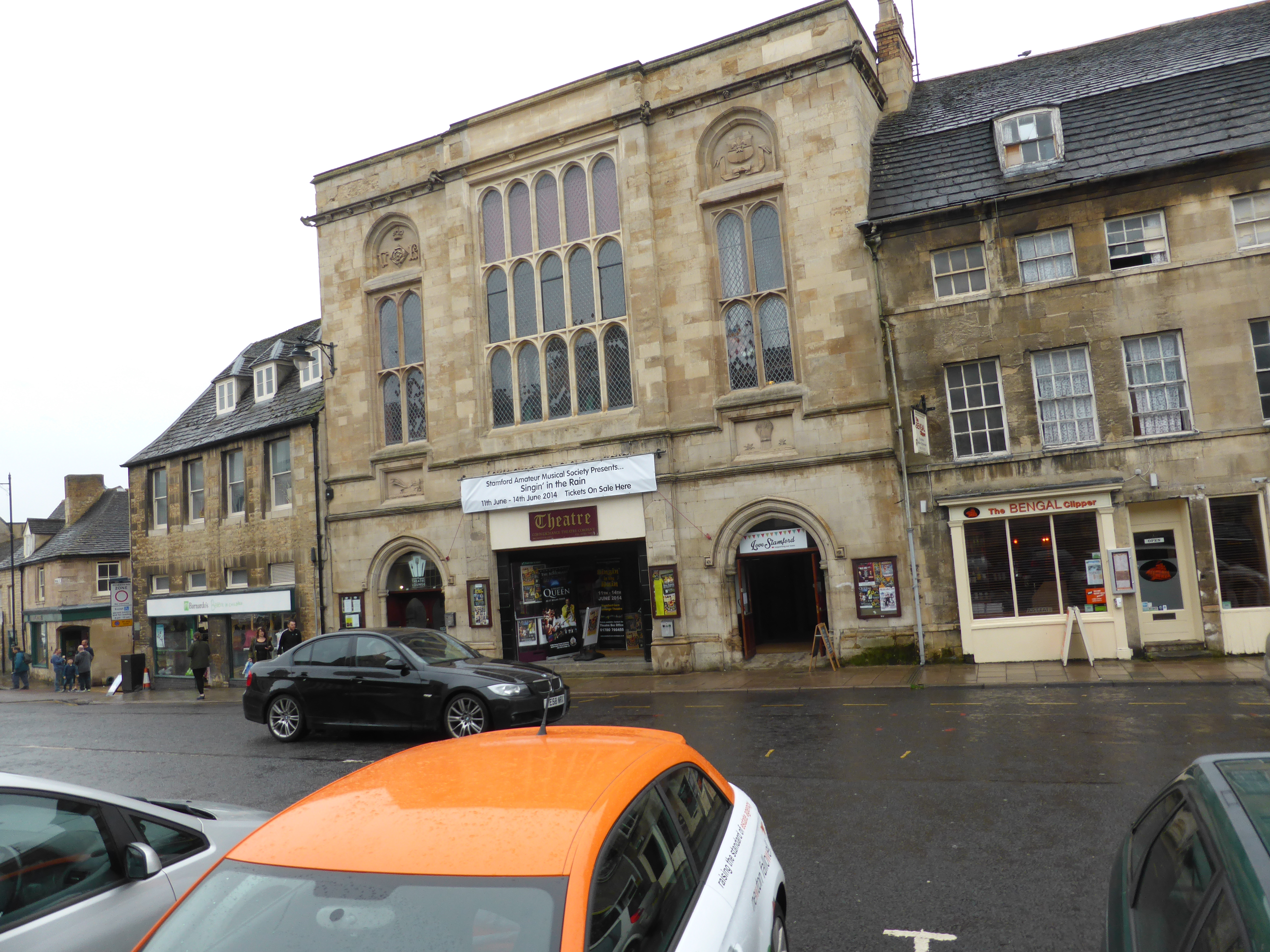
Corn Exchange, Stamford

- Spalding Corn Exchange. 1855 by Bellamy and Hardy. This was built in the style of Elizabeth. Pevsner in 1964 described it as Jacobean, three bays, with brick with shaped gable. Demolished in 1972 and replaced by the South Holland Centre.
- Stamford Corn Exchange, Broad Street. 1859 Tudor Gothic with a large first floor window with a shallow projecting bay. Altered after a fire in 1925.

=== Merseyside ===
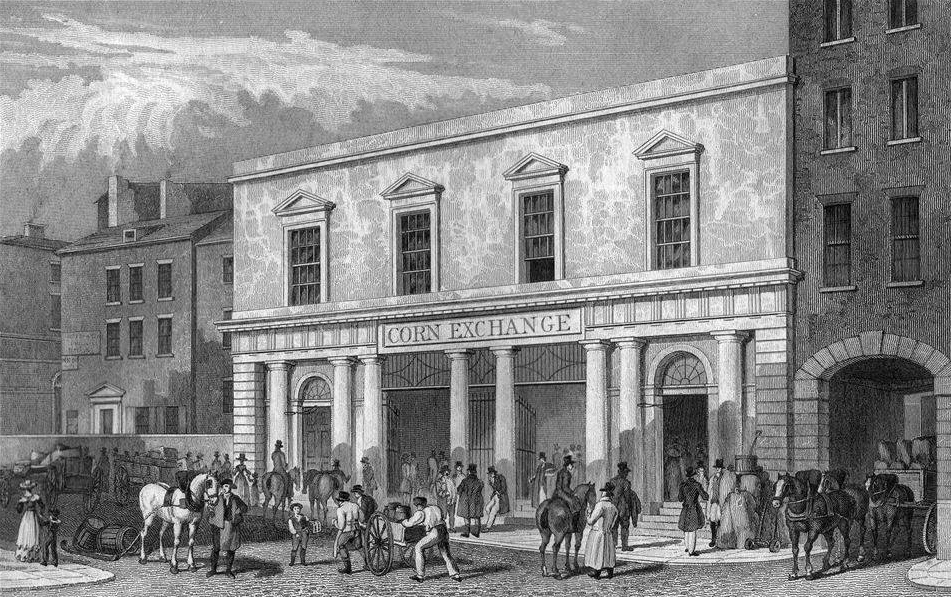
Corn Exchange, Liverpool 1827

- Liverpool Corn Exchange. Brunswick Street. Before 1807 the corn merchants of Liverpool had transacted their business in the open space in front of the town hall, which had been the Exchange building; but in that year they decided to erect an Exchange of their own. The new building of 1807 was designed by J. Foster senior, at a cost of £10,000 in shares of £100 each. In 1809, the quantity of wheat imported was 114,000 quarters; oats 460,000 quarters; flour 13,000 bags and 170,000 barrels. In 1912 the figures were: wheat 5,813,187 quarters; oats 599,603 quarters; flour 407,285 sacks; maize 1,756,712 quarters; beans 115,881 quarters; barley 244,515 quarters; peas 106,506 quarters; oatmeal 89,073 loads. The corn exchange was rebuilt in 1853–54 by J A Picton, and again in 1953–59 after destruction in the Second World War.

=== Norfolk ===
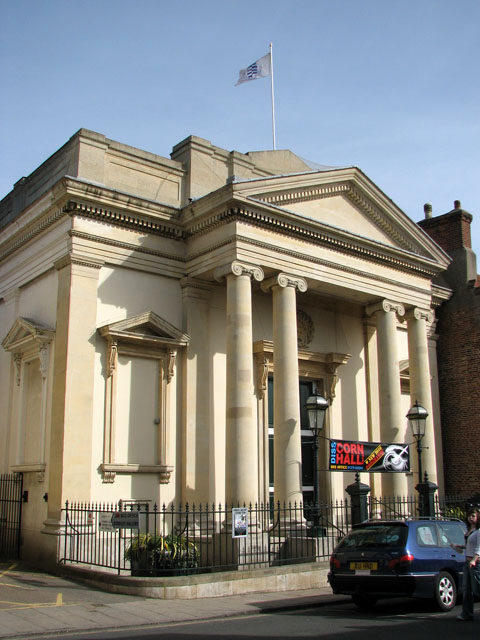
Corn Hall, Diss 1854

- Diss Corn Hall. (1854) Greek inspired with ashlar facade. By George Atkins. Pevsner was particularly impressed by this corn exchange, commenting "remarkably civilised facade ... It has nothing of the boisterous facades of most corn exchanges. The three-bay front is dominated by the vigorously projecting centre portico carried on a pair of giant unfluted Ionic columns beneath a boldly dentillated pediment. The effect is striking. Blind pedimented windows to the right and left, consoles to the central door hood under the portico. The hall has an interior articulated with giant Doric pilasters."
- Dereham Corn Exchange. (1856–1857). By J & M W Goggs of Swaffham. Brick with stuccoed facade in the form of a triumphal arch with Corinthian columns each side with block entablatures. Until it was struck by lightning in 1950 the facade was surmounted by a statue of Thomas Coke. It closed in 1926 and was converted to a cinema.
- Fakenham Corn Exchange. Market Place. (1854–1855). Designed by John Brown of Norwich, who was the Norfolk County Surveyor. Brick with stucco dressings, four rounded corners with rusticated quoins. Used as a cinema.
- Great Yarmouth 1842. North side of Regent Street. Since demolished.

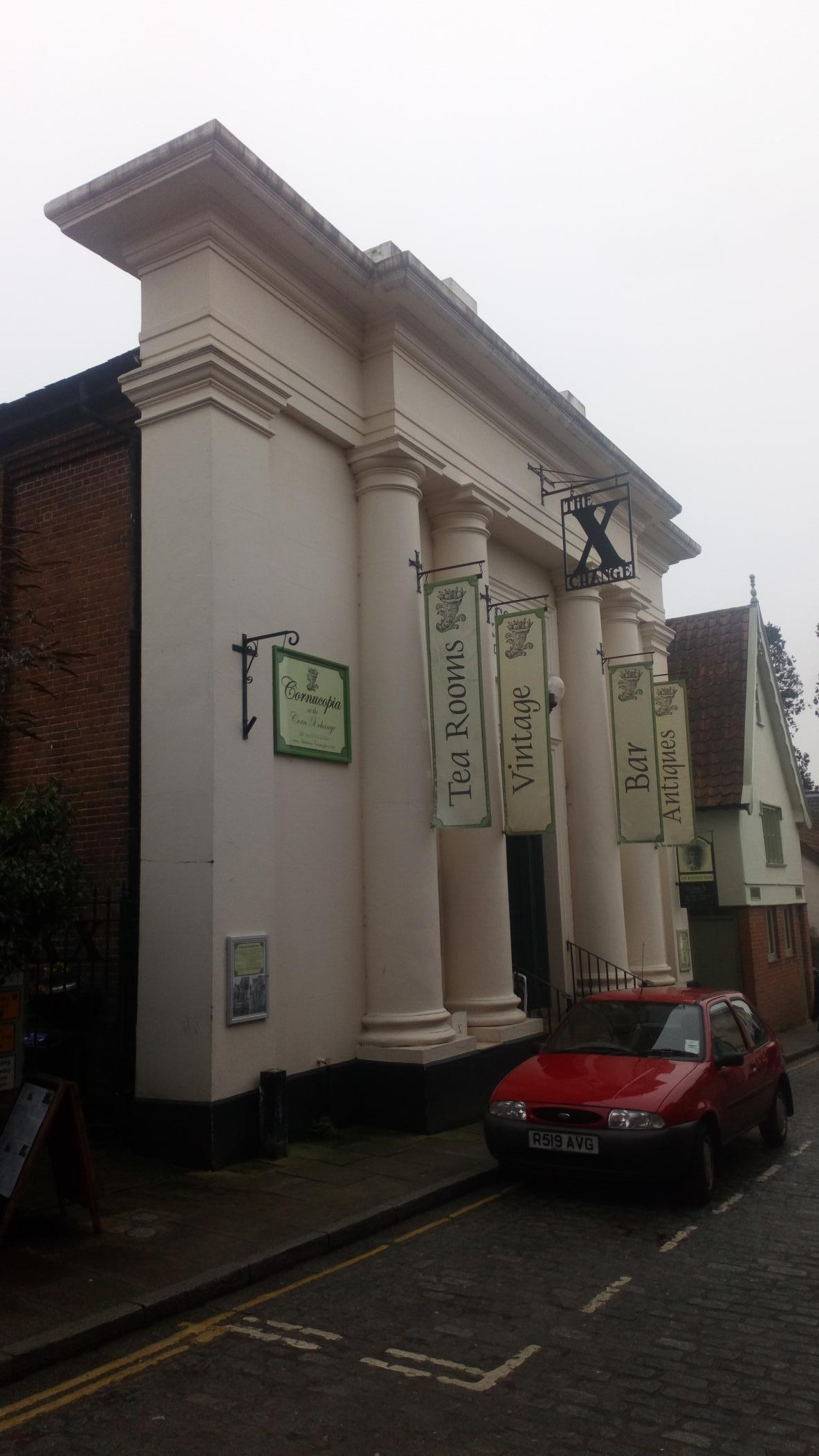
Corn Exchange, Harleston 1849

- Harleston Corn Exchange. 1849. By John Bunn "A crude design based on giant Tuscan columns". It has a windowless front with paired giant Tuscan columns supporting a ponderous and featureless architrave. The ceiling inside has deep rectangular coffers, those in the middle with roof lights. Now partitioned for shops.

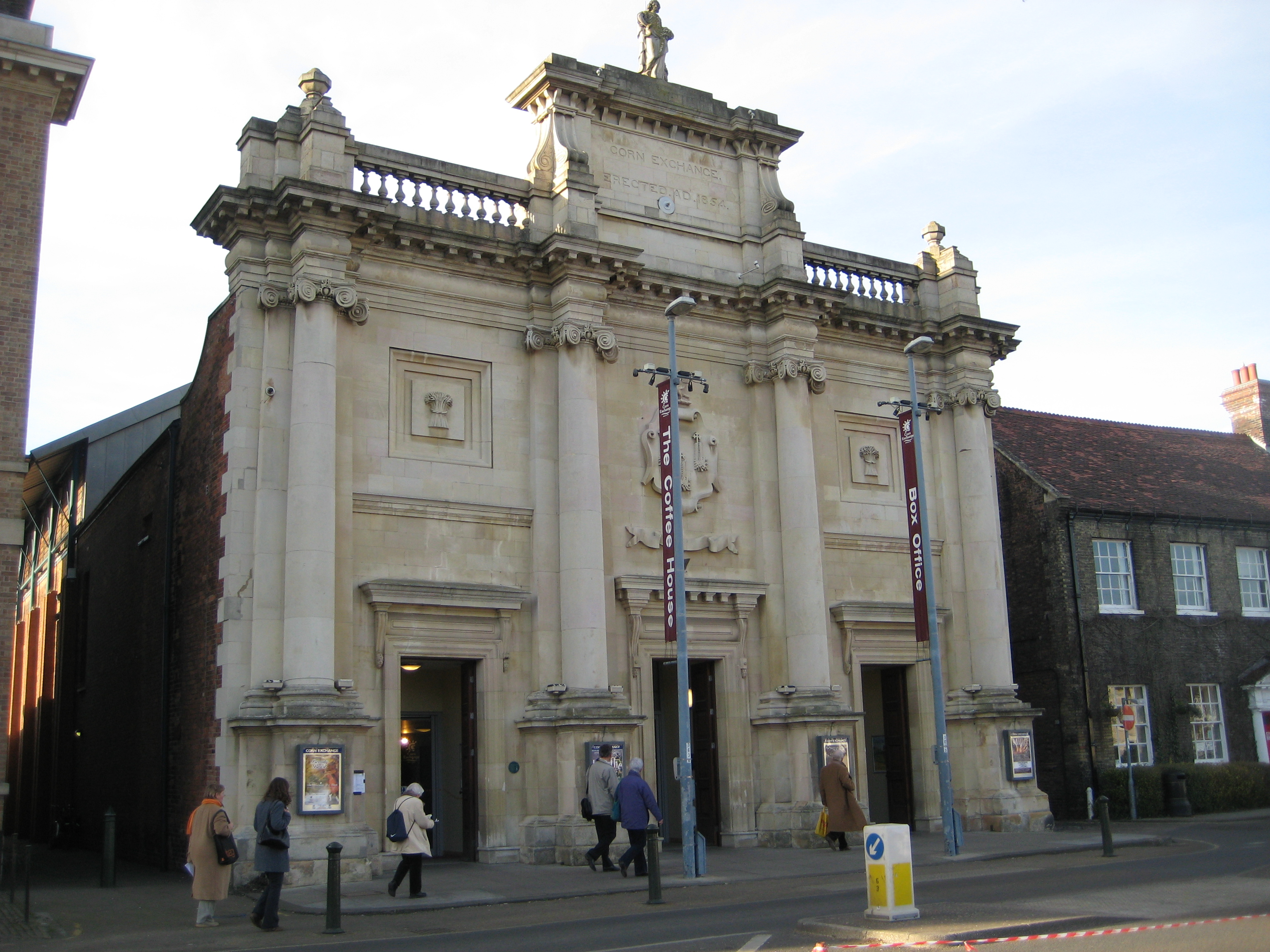
Corn Exchange, King's Lynn, 1854

- King's Lynn Corn Exchange, Tuesday Market Place. (1854). By Cruso and Maberley, architects working in London and King's Lynn. Described by Pevsner and Wilson as "jolly and vulgar"; they compare it with other Baroque Corn exchanges such as Newark and Sudbury. The frontage has four giant attached Ionic columns in front of Ionic pilasters. There are three doorways with moulded surrounds, the centre one being more ornate. Above central door is a cartouche emblazoned with the Arms of King's Lynn surmounted by a pelican, in panels to flanking bays are sheafs of corn. There is a balustraded parapet hiding the roof. A central panel rises out of the parapet with its own entablature. Within it is carved: CORN EXCHANGE. ERECTED.AD.1854. Above this is a statue of Ceres. It is Grade II listed.

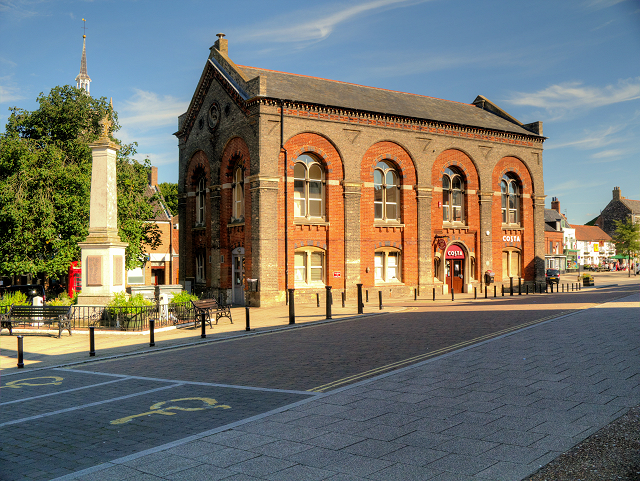
Corn Hall, Swaffham

- Norwich. 1859–1860 by T.D. Barry. Demolished in 1964.
- Swaffham Corn Hall. (1858). Market Place. Pevsner and Wilson consider this "a depressing round arched structure of red and gault brick like a Methodist church in four by two bays". It is dated 1858, built and probably designed by Mathias Goggs, a local builder. The ground floor had a reading room, library and billiard room.

=== Northamptonshire ===
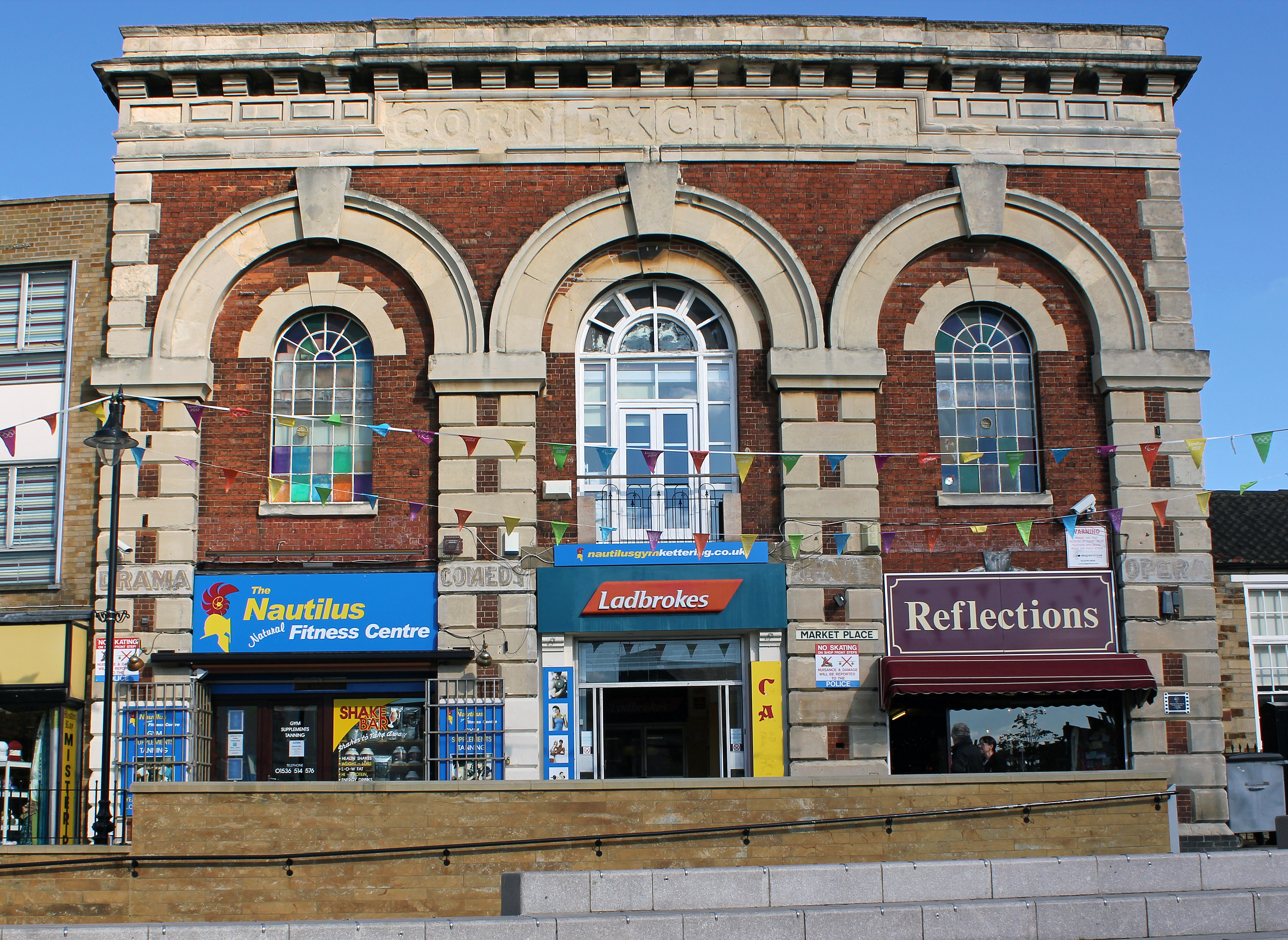
Corn Exchange, Kettering

- Kettering Corn Exchange, Market Place (1853). The architect was E. F. Low. Red brick, two storeys, three bays with giant blank arches. The upper floor was designed as the town hall.

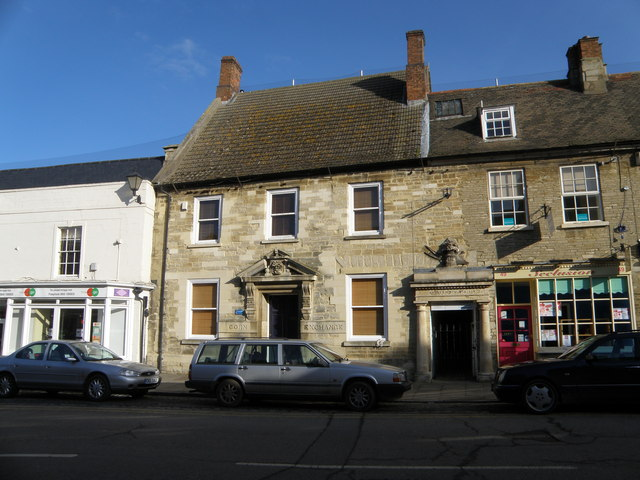
Corn Exchange, Thrapston 1850

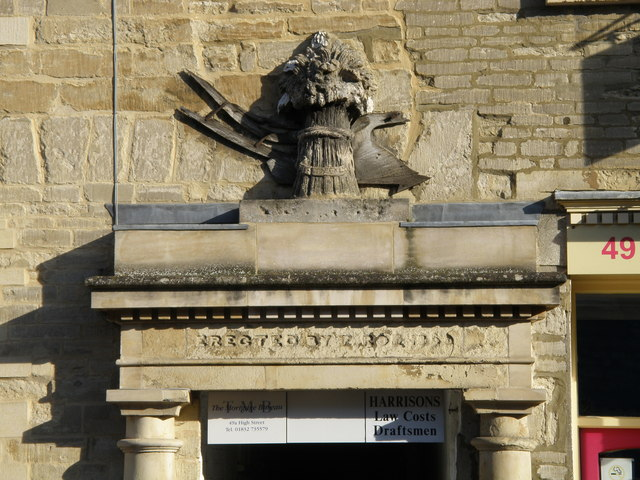
Detail above the door at Thrapston Corn Exchange - sheaf of wheat and plough

- Thrapston Corn Exchange. No. 47 High Street. Originally the George Inn, but converted by a Mr Roe into a corn exchange in 1850. Central entrance has flanking Doric order Doric pilasters with plain entablature and dentilled cornice. Corn exchange on left has broken pediment with moulded brackets and central corn sheaf motif. Flanking windows are plain 19th-century sashes under stone lintels with key blocks. Central entrance has a partially legible inscription Erected by F Roe with the date 1850 over. Relief corn sheaf and wooden plough over entrance. Rear elevation has short 18th-century wing and two 19th-century ranges, including the hall of the corn exchange. Interior: central entrance gives access to small light well, probably remains of central courtyard area. Corn exchange interior is a large 19th-century hall.

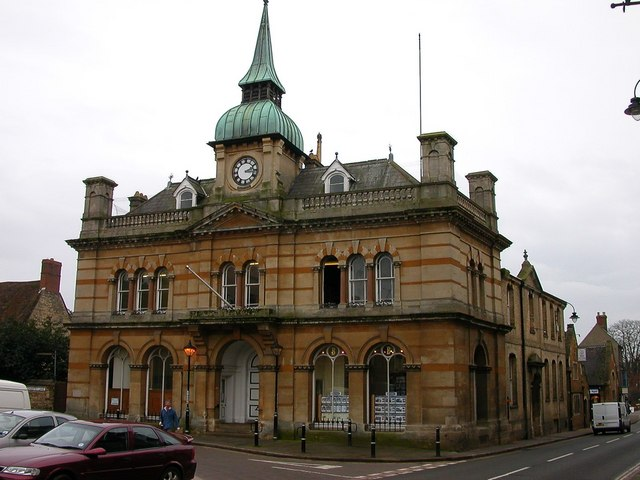
Towcester Town Hall and Corn Exchange

- Towcester Town Hall and Corn Exchange Watling Street East. 1865 by T.H. Vernon. Italianate with a central tower. Limestone ashlar, banded with ironstone, hipped Welsh slate roof with ornamental ridge tiles and wrought iron finials. Two storeys and attic. Clock tower with copper-clad belfry. Two-storey wing to rear right of white brick in Flemish bond with segmental-arched sash windows and side door with segmental-arched head with key block flanked by pilasters supporting pediment.
- Wellingborough Corn Exchange. Market Square. (1861). Competition won by Bellamy and Hardy in 1859. It was the home to the Electric Theatre, which later became the Regal Cinema. It was demolished in 1958.

=== Northumberland ===
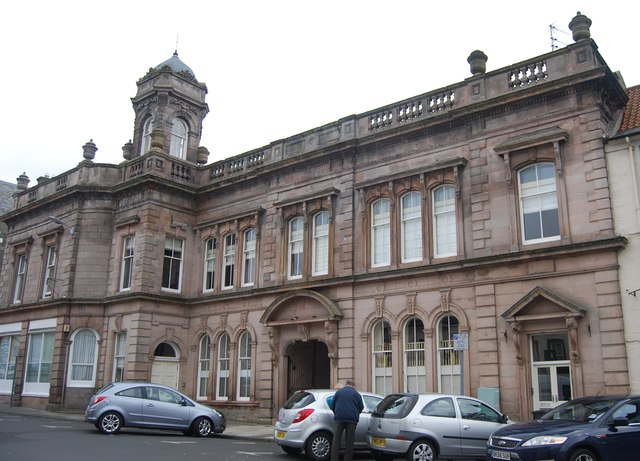
Corn Exchange, Berwick-upon-Tweed, 1858

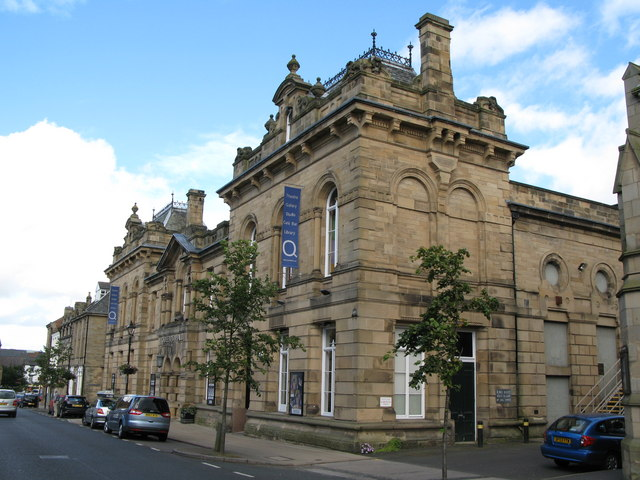
Queen's Hall Town Hall and Corn Exchange, Hexham 1866

- Berwick-upon-Tweed Corn Exchange, Sandgate. (1858). Main street front has a seven-window facade with moulded plinth, rusticated quoins, moulded entablature at ground and first floor, surmounted by a balustraded parapet decorated with urns. Inside the former dealing hall has deeply moulded and coved ceiling with glazed panels hidden above false ceiling frame. The west gallery is supported on cast-iron columns now buried within later dividing wall, gallery has cast-iron balustrade with moulded wooden handrail. The building was partly converted into a swimming pool and partly into offices c.1965. Grade II listed.
- Hexham. Queen's Hall Completed in 1866 as the town hall and corn exchange. By the 1920s it contained a dance hall and the Queen's Hall cinema. It was saved from demolition in 1975 and re-opened as the Queen's Hall Arts centre with a library, art rooms, theatre and gallery.

=== North Yorkshire ===
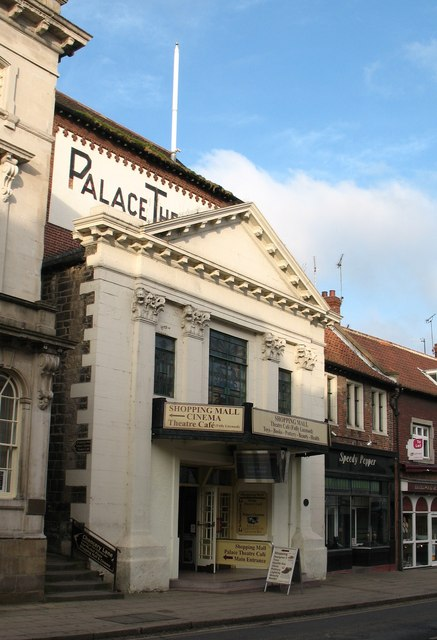
Former Corn Exchange, Malton

- Helmsley Corn Exchange. 1901. Established on the ground floor of the town hall.
- Malton Corn Exchange. Dates from 1845 when it was built as the corn exchange. However, it never appears to have fulfilled its original role, being too far from the livestock market. In 1914 it became the Exchange Cinema and was improved and upgraded as the Palace Theatre Cinema in the 1930s. After a period of decline and eventual closure it has found a new life as a small shopping arcade with cinema above.

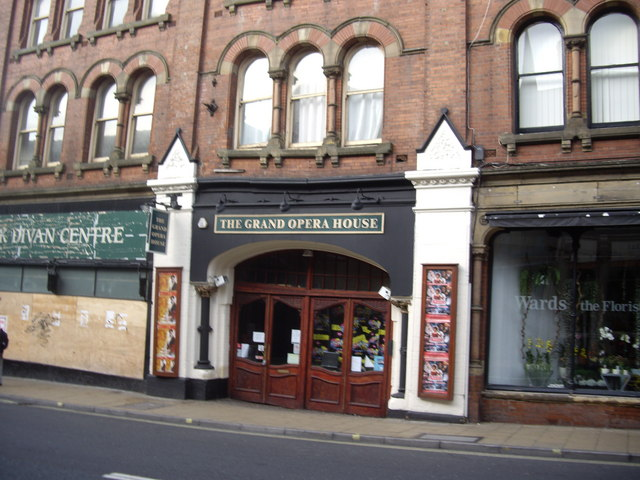
Grand Opera House, former corn Exchange in York

- York Corn Exchange. On the corner of Cumberland Street and Clifford Street. Corn exchange by G A Dean of 1868 and converted by J P Briggs into a Music Hall in 1902. Restored in 1989 as the Grand Opera House. Cumberland Street frontage is of red brick in English bond, banded in orange brick, on a sandstone plinth. King Street front of red brick in Flemish bond, on rusticated sandstone plinth, with sandstone ashlar dressings and bands of cogged brick.

=== Nottinghamshire ===
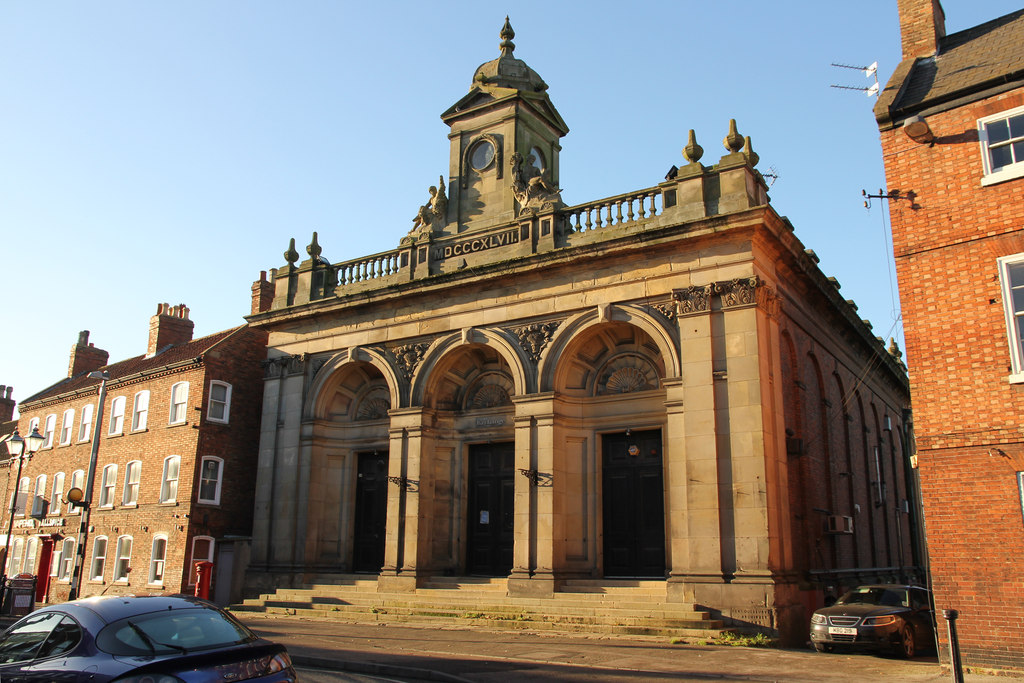
Corn Exchange, Newark-on-Trent. 1847

- Newark Corn Exchange. Castlegate. 1847. Designed by Henry Duesbury an architect from Derby. Baroque revival architure style. A datestone in the centre of the parapet above the doors, carries the date 1847 in (Roman numerals MDCCCXLVII). The building has a central, square tower with pilastered corners and pedimented gable, topped with an octagonal dome with finial. On each face a blank dial draped with a sheaf. Life-size supporting figures of Agriculture and Commerce sit either side of the tower.

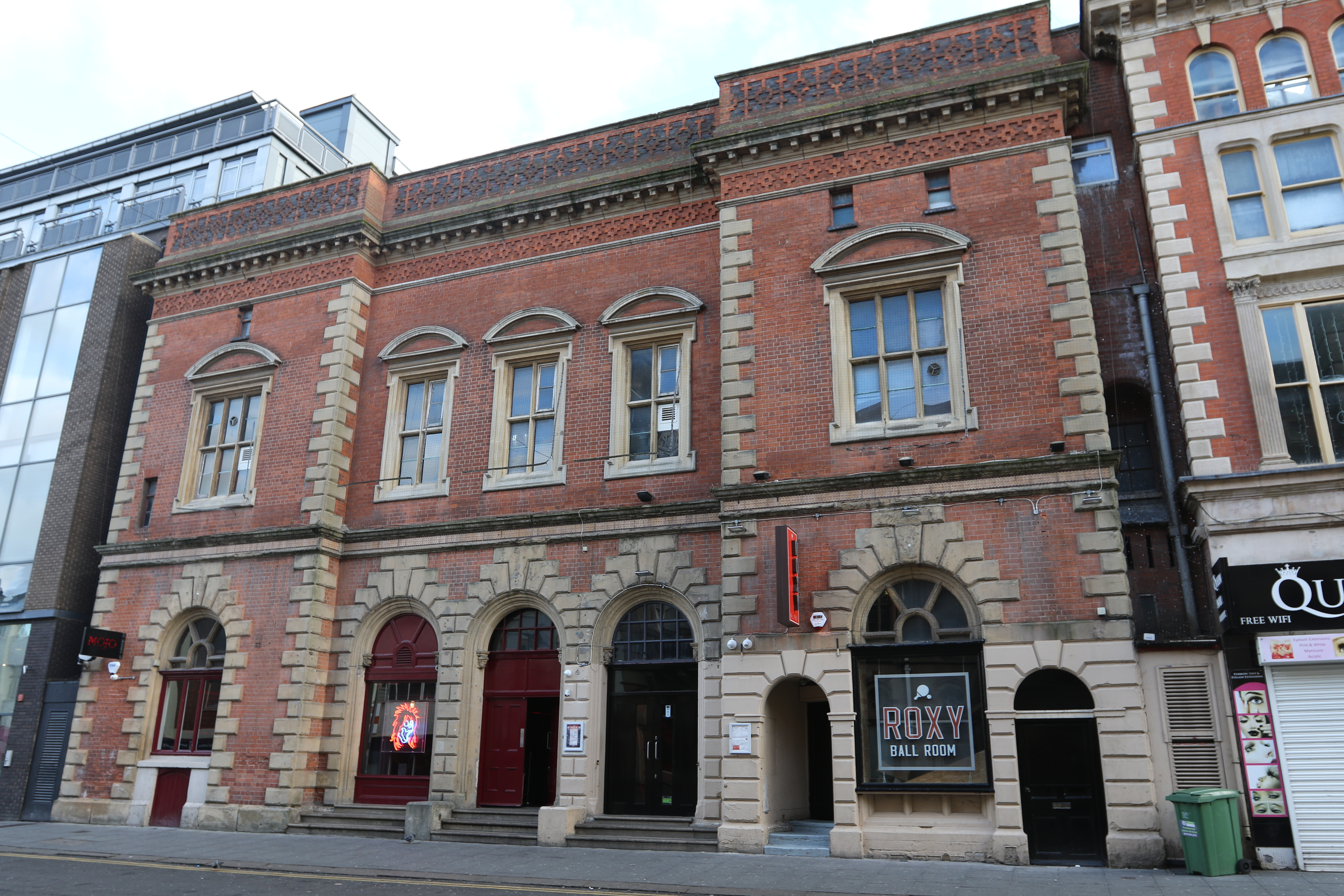
Corn Exchange, Nottingham

- Nottingham Corn Exchange, 8-12 Thurland Street. The larger brick building with stone quoins, formerly the corn exchange, was built in 1849–1850 to the designs of Thomas Chambers Hine, and was the building which established his late classical Anglo-Italian style. Grade II listed.

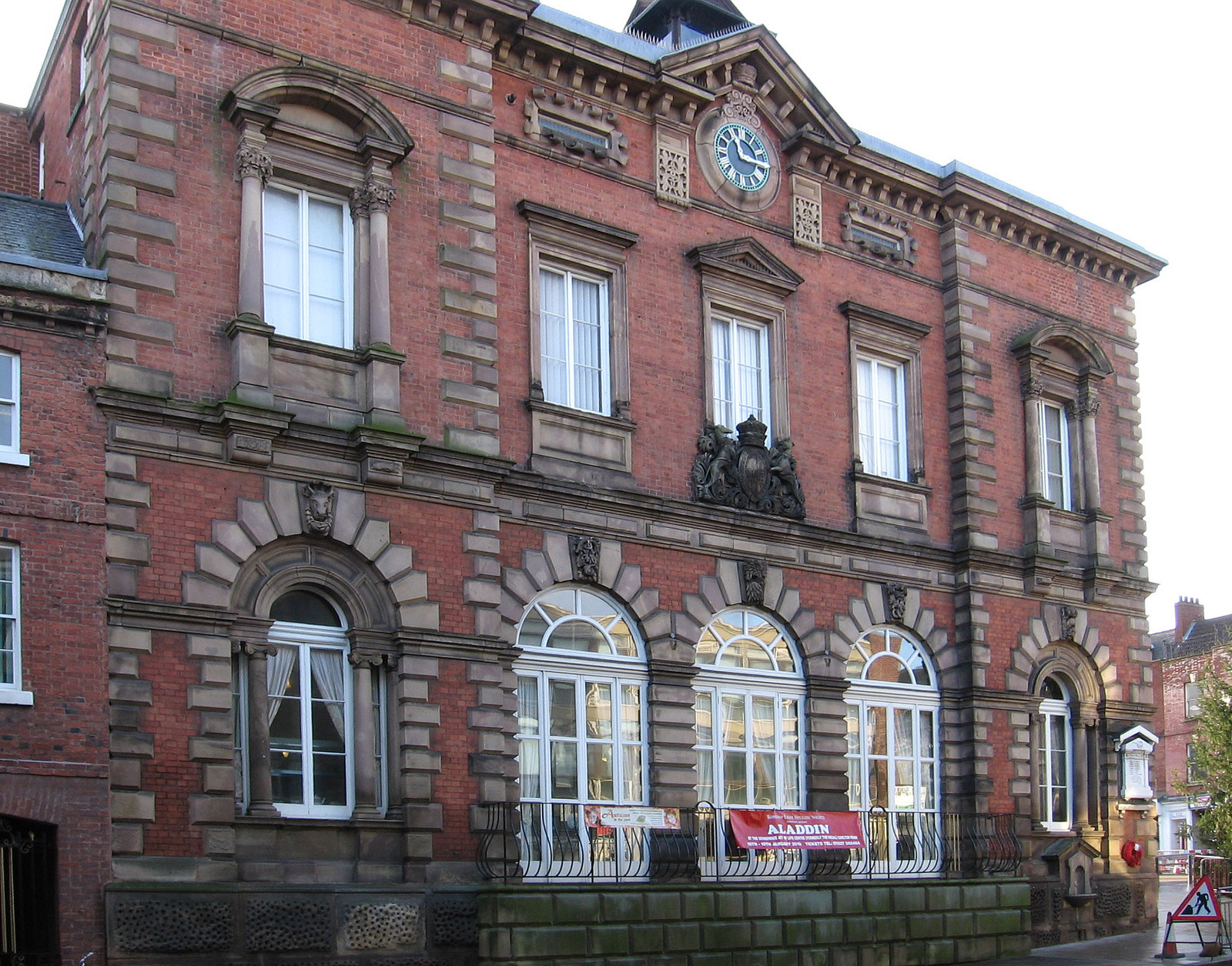
Worksop Town Hall, a former corn exchange completed in 1851

- Retford. Corn exchange built as part of town hall complex in 1866–1868 by Bellamy and Hardy. The town hall remains, but the Corn Exchange was demolished about 1980.
- Worksop Corn Exchange. The corn exchange was built in 1851, following demolition of houses in the Market Place. It was designed by Charles Gilbert of Nottingham in the Venetian style for the Corn Exchange and Market Company, who raised £5,000 from £10 shares. In 1882 it was purchased by the Local Board of Health. It became the Worksop Town Hall in 1894 when Worksop Urban District Council was formed.

=== Oxfordshire ===
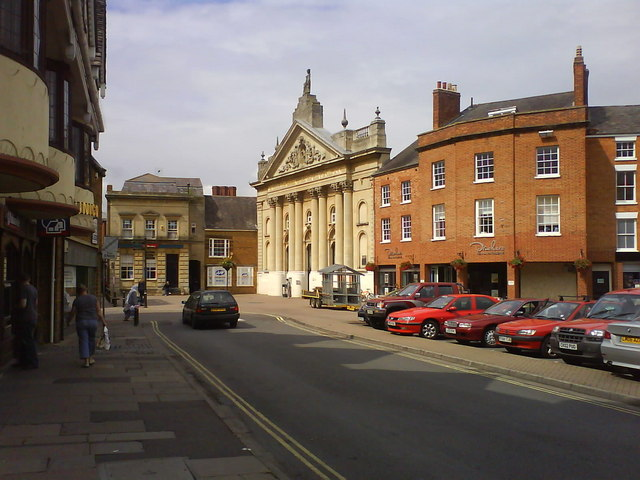
The Cornhill Corn Exchange in the Market Square

- Banbury. Banbury had two corn exchanges. Both opened on the same day 3 September 1857, when they were recorded in the national press as "utterly unfit for business". There was considerable (and notorious) rivalry between the two exchanges, which were respectively promoted by the Banbury Corn Exchange Co. Ltd., and the Central Corn Exchange for Banbury Co. Ltd. The impressive facade to the Cornhill Corn Exchange was designed by W. Hill of Leeds and built by Kimberley of Banbury, with a separate contract with Thorpe and Ponder for stone carving. The classical facade is entered through a portico formed of a giant order of four sets of coupled Corinthian pilasters beneath a heavy entablature and pediment. This was originally surmounted by a standing figure of Ceres. The façade survives as the entrance to the Castle Quay Shopping Centre. The Central Corn Exchange was also built in 1857, though the front to the Market Place was later than the main hall. The hall was of brick, with appropriate decoration in pressed brick, the detail loosely derived from 17th-century France. The building has been attributed to James Murray of Coventry. The Central Corn Exchange was demolished in 1979 and replaced by a branch of Midland Bank.

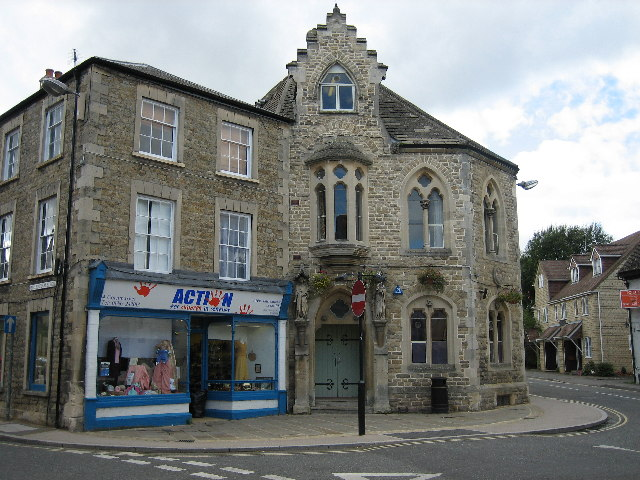
Corn Exchange, Faringdon 1863

- Faringdon Corn Exchange. 1863. Former corn exchange and Savings Bank in Victorian Gothic Style. Grade II listed. Stone with ashlar dressings. Large one-storey hall with two-storey front range to Cornmarket Asymmetrical front range with two windows to Cornmarket. Gothic doorway arched with quatrefoil opening and tympanum and inscribed scroll over. Statue each side on buttress with small carved canopy over. Three-sided canted oriel with 1863 date-stone. Cusped trefoil window heads with quatrefoil top-lights. Crow-stepped gable with Gothic attic window under hood-mould. Gloucester Street elevation similar, with two light windows on each floor, Main Hall with five windows between with buttresses. Long triple windows with dividing shafts and carved capitals, shouldered heads and carved bosses over shafts. The former Savings Bank is attached to the west with inscription Faringdon Savings Bank 1863.and monogrammed plaque 'FTSB 1818'.

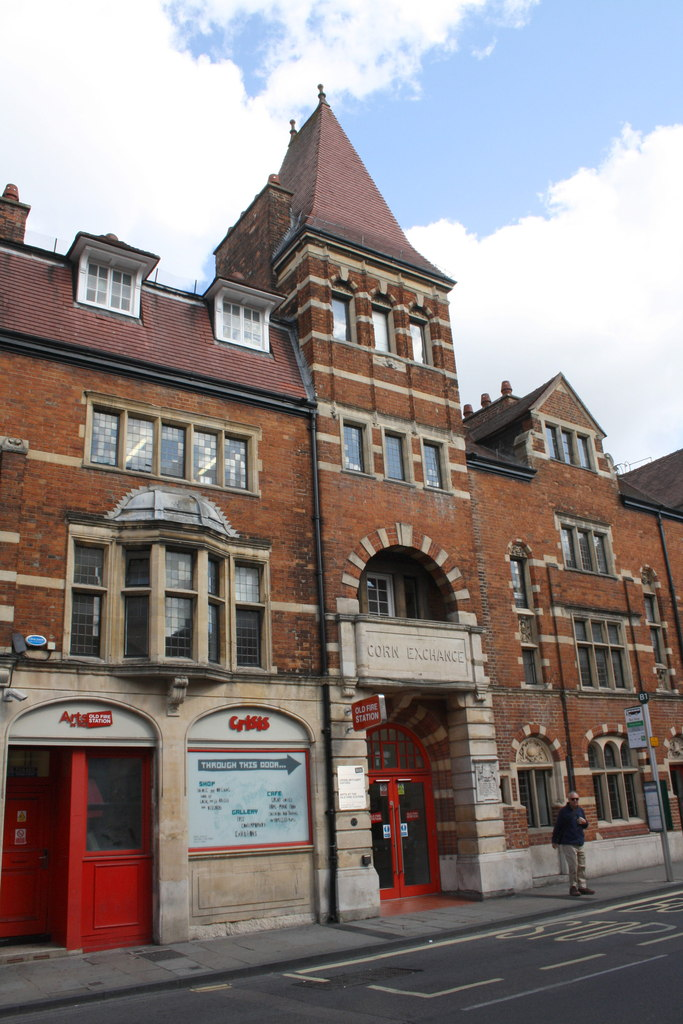
Former Corn Exchange and Fire Station, Oxford

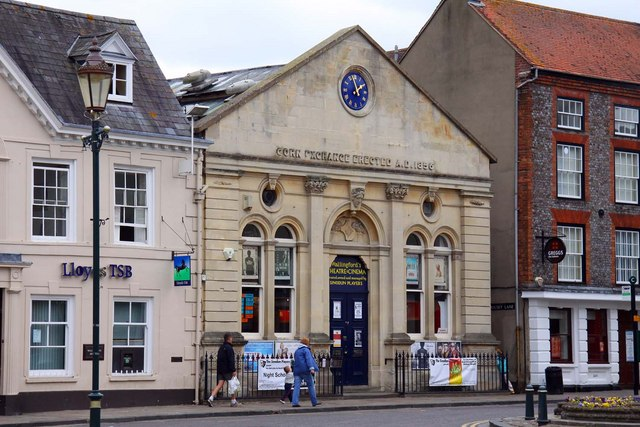
Corn Exchange, Wallingford 1856

- Oxford Corn Exchange. An older corn exchange was replaced on a different site by the Gothic fire station and corn exchange were designed by H. W. Moore and built in George Street by Thomas Axtell in 1894–1896. The fire station was moved in 1971 and it has later been occupied by the Oxford Playhouse Company and an Arts centre.
- Wallingford Corn Exchange. 1856. Market Place. Now theatre and cinema. Dated 1856 on an inscription on the pediment. Ashlared Bath stone in an Italianate style. Single storey with three-bay frontage. Stone plinth with moulded top. Vermiculated panels to base of pilasters to left of right of centre, and to base of rusticated piers to left and right. Blind balustrading between vermiculated panels. Double entrance door with canted surround and carved tympanum. Corinthian pilasters on either side of the door. Corinthian capitals to rusticated piers on the left and right. Bulls-eye windows with carved keystones up to the frieze of order. Gable with rose window having central clock. Inside there are cast-iron roof trusses by Wilders of Wallingford.

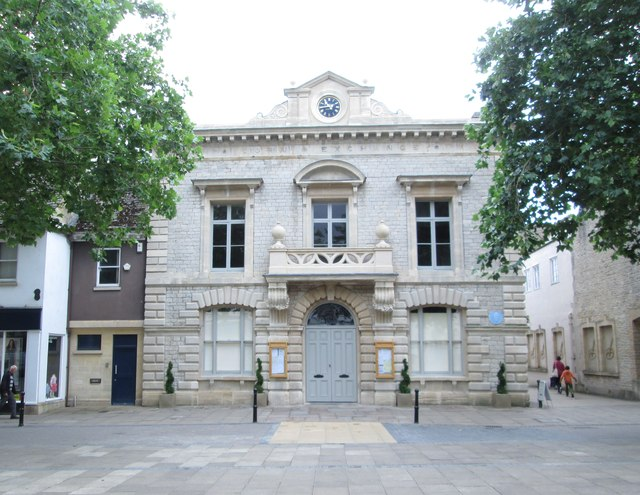
Corn Exchange, Witney

- Witney Corn Exchange. Market Square, built in 1863 by a private company. Italian Classical style. Squared and coursed limestone, with rusticated pilaster strips and dressings Semi-circular arched doorway with rusticated surrounds to panelled double-leaf doors; balcony above supported by two huge brackets with carved flower swags. First-floor cross-windows set in moulded stone architraves with bracketed cornices and central segmental pediment. Modillioned stone cornice beneath low parapet. Consoles flank central open-pedimented gable with ball finials and lunette.

=== Shropshire ===
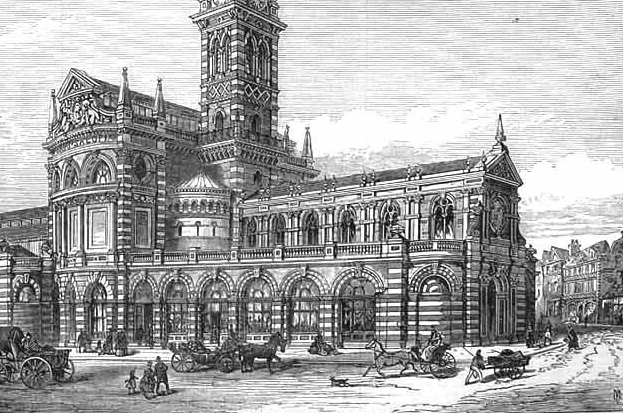
Shrewsbury Corn Exchange and Market Hall 1869

- Much Wenlock Corn Exchange. 1852. "Corn Market and Agricultural Library 1852". The building is still used as a public library.
- Newport Corn Exchange. (1859) Stafford Street. A Corn Exchange was built as part of complex which included cattle market, covered market, new town hall, Mechanic's Institute and magistrate's courts. The architect was Mr Danby, possibly Thomas Danby.
- Shrewsbury. Mardol. Corn exchange and market hall. (1869). An impressive building in a mixed Venetian Gothic style with a clock tower and spire. It was demolished and replaced by the present Market Hall in 1965.

=== Somerset ===
- Bridgwater Corn Exchange, Corn Hill. John Bowen designed the original circular Market House in 1834. To this was added the corn exchange of 1875 by Charles Knowles. The Corn Exchange immediately behind the rotunda, is square with a glazed hipped roof above horizontal-planked coving with rich late 19th-century ornamentation to the front and back walls. The central entrances have Byzantine-style semi-circular brick arches with a large keystone. On the tympanum are the Town Arms on the rear arch and angels on a tympanum over the main entrance.

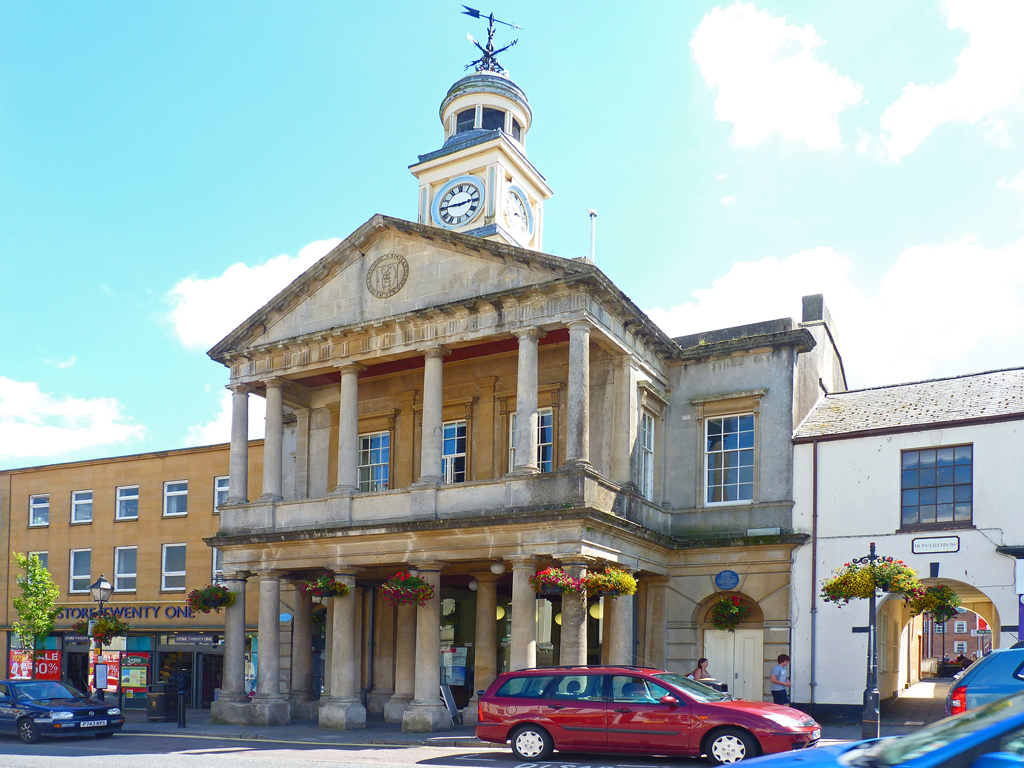
The Guildhall, Chard

- The Guildhall, Chard is a Grade II* listed building in the centre of the town that dates back to 1837 and was also the corn exchange. The Guildhall houses the offices of Chard Town Council.
- Glastonbury
- Yeovil. On land between the back of the town hall, and the adjacent cheese market. Completed and opened in 1859. The corn exchange was demolished in 1962.

=== South Yorkshire ===
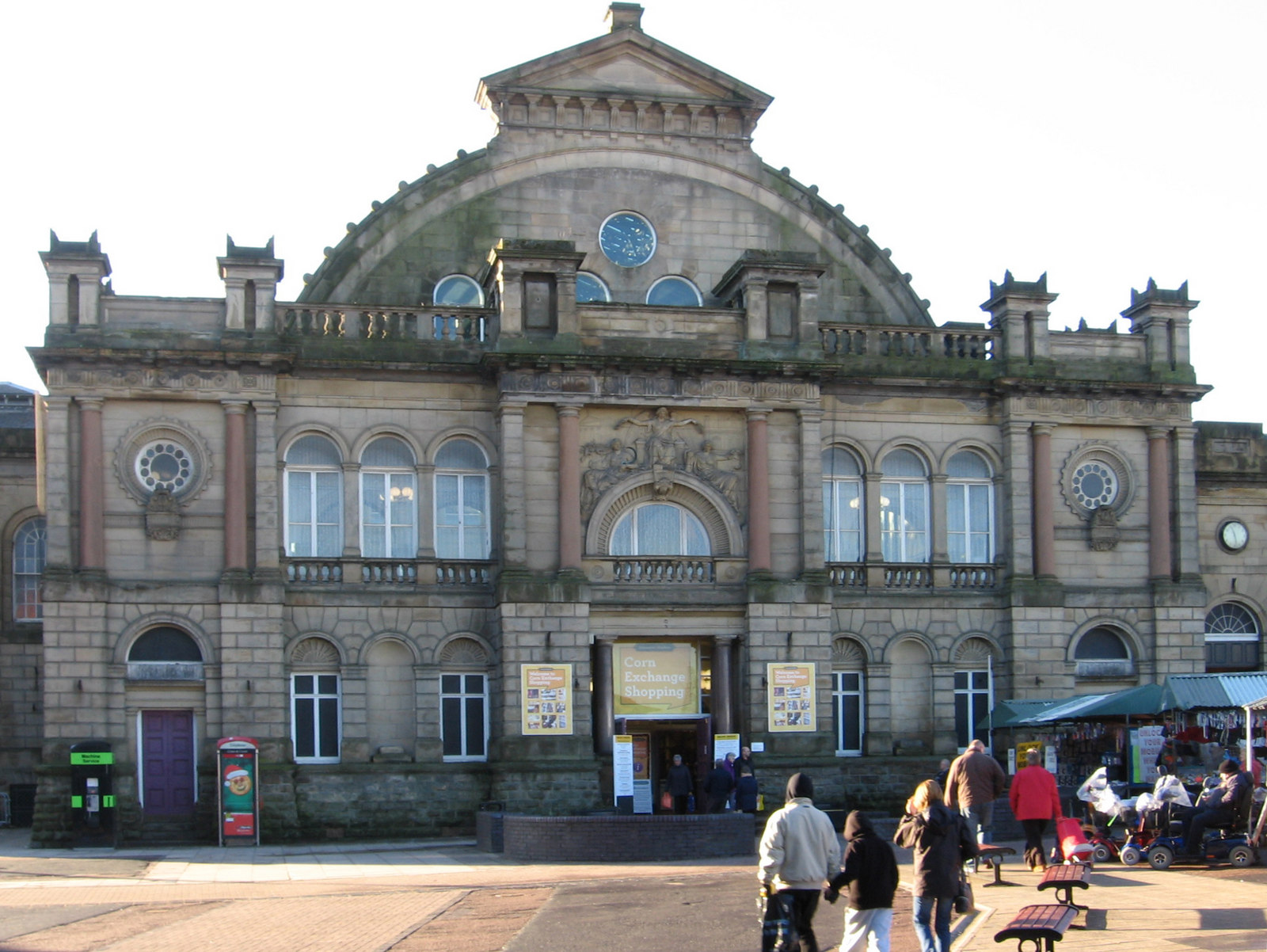
Doncaster Corn Exchange

- Doncaster Corn Exchange. The impressive facade and arched Exchange buildings were built to the designs of William Watkins of Lincoln, who won an architectural competition in 1870. It is set within an earlier U-shaped Market Hall structure of 1847–1849 by J Butterfield, the architect to Doncaster Corporation. The Corn Market, Market Hall and Fish Markets were further extended in 1930 and the overall complex is Grade II listed. The Corn exchange has projecting central and side bays with corner pilasters and red-sandstone columns to first floor. The ground floor has side bays has pilastered semi-circular doors with plain fanlights. The central bay has doors below an entablature supported by paired polished granite columns. The side bays have circular windows in cavetto surrounds with fluted friezes with central corbelled coats of arms. The central bay is surmounted by a panel of symbolic female figures in relief. On the front balustrade is the inscription Wm Cotterill Clark Mayor 1873, over which is an Entablature modillioned cornice and a triglyph frieze with paterae. The interior of the corn exchange is very elaborate with a gallery supported on a round arched arcade with alternating plain and panelled pilasters between the arches. Galleries to sides have paired iron columns with foliate capitals supported by round arches of pierced ironwork with sumptuous decoration to the spandrels. Roof with iron arched trusses with decorative bracing, with a large central ridge light supported on foliate trusses.
- Sheffield, Corn Exchange, Broad Street. Built for the Duke of Norfolk at a cost of £55,000 in 1881. The architect was probably Matthew Ellison Hadfield and the building was decorated with carvings by Frank Tory. The central hall of the corn exchange was gutted by fire in 1947 and the offices surrounding it were demolished in 1964.

=== Staffordshire ===
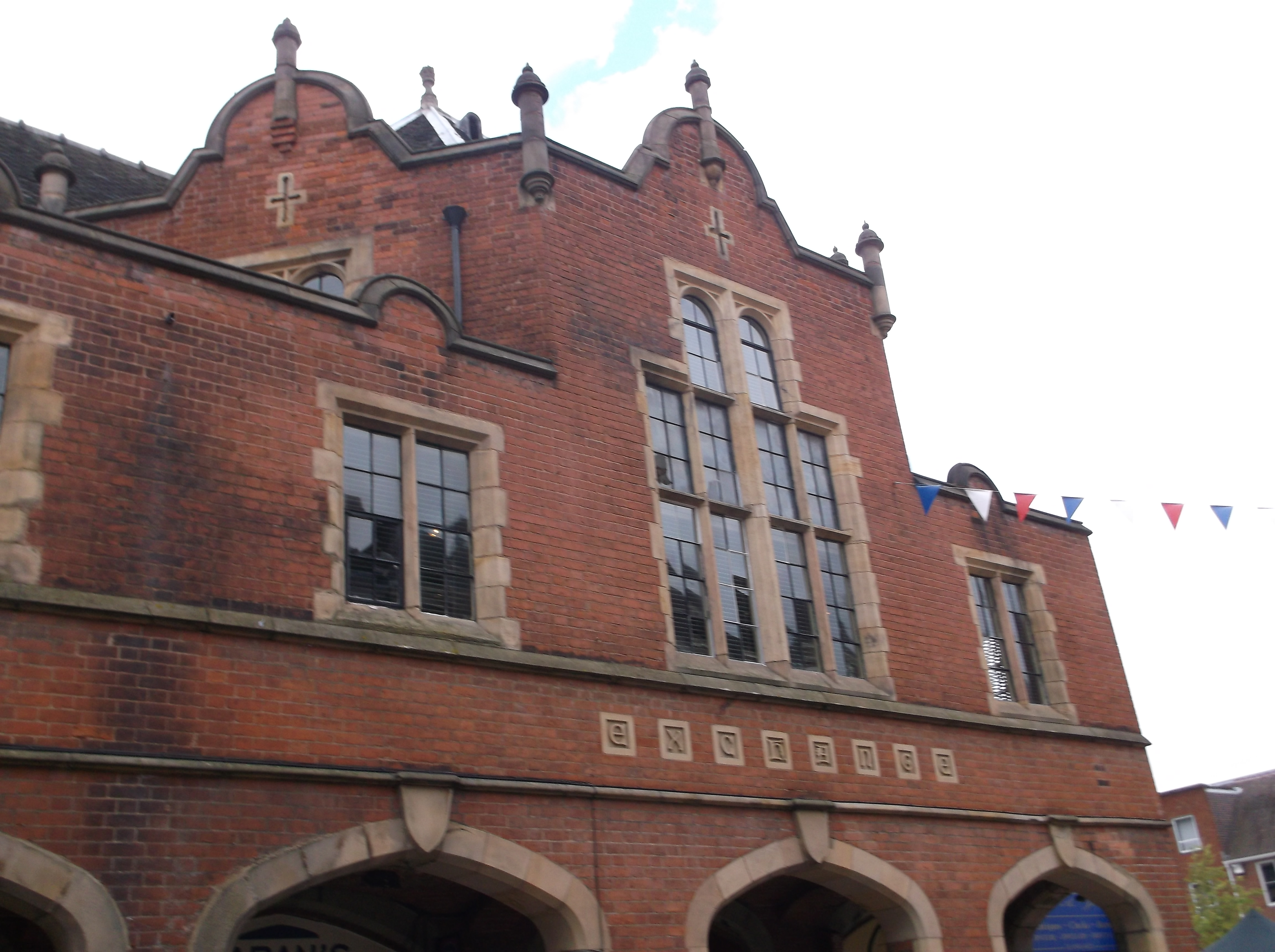
Corn Exchange, Lichfield, 1849

- Lichfield Corn Exchange, Conduit Street, Lichfield, Staffordshire, a grade II listed building built between 1849 and 1850. The architects were Thomas Johnson and Son. Brick with stone dressings with shaped gables. Low, symmetrical of two stories, with an arcade of four centred arches.

=== Suffolk ===
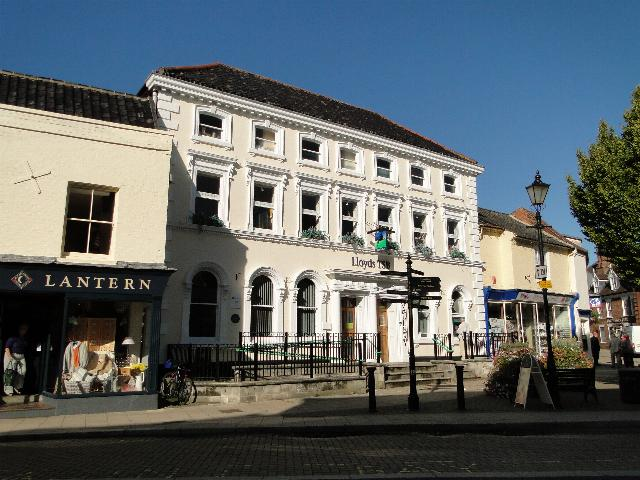
Corn Exchange, Beccles

- Beccles Corn Exchange. Exchange Square. Originally built as a theatre in 1819. Converted into a corn exchange in 1845 and into a bank c.1919. Two and a half storey. Stuccoed with arched windows to ground floor. First floor windows with cornices on consoles. Now Lloyds Bank.

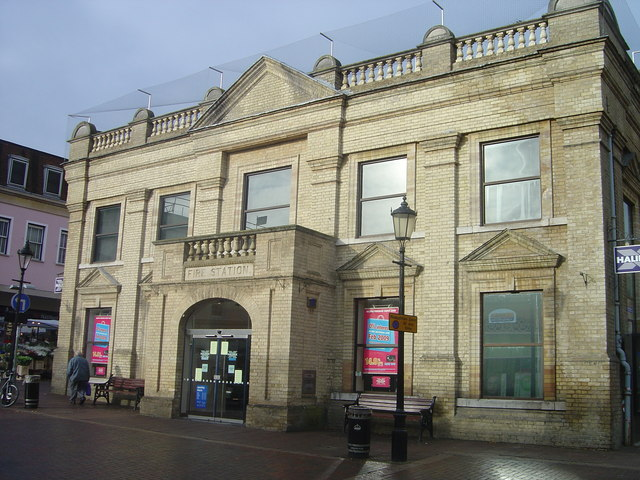
Bury St Edmund's Corn Exchange of 1836.

- Bury St Edmunds Corn Exchange, Cornhill. There are two corn exchanges in Bury St Edmunds. The earlier one, now known as: Units 1, 2 and 3 Cornhill, was built in the early 19th century with a fire station at the south. Later a public library and now converted into shopping units. White brick with stone dressings. The east and west fronts are single-storeyed with an eight-window range, the windows, all with 20th-century replacement glazing, set in moulded-brick architraves with triangular pediments. A tetrastyle porches to both fronts with attached columns, frieze and pediment. The whole building has a stone balustraded parapet with a moulded brick cornice and semicircular stone caps to the brick piers. This was replaced by the impressive corn exchange of 1861–1862 by Ellis and Woodard, architects of Fenchurch Street, London. The ironwork is by Ransomes and Sims of Ipswich.
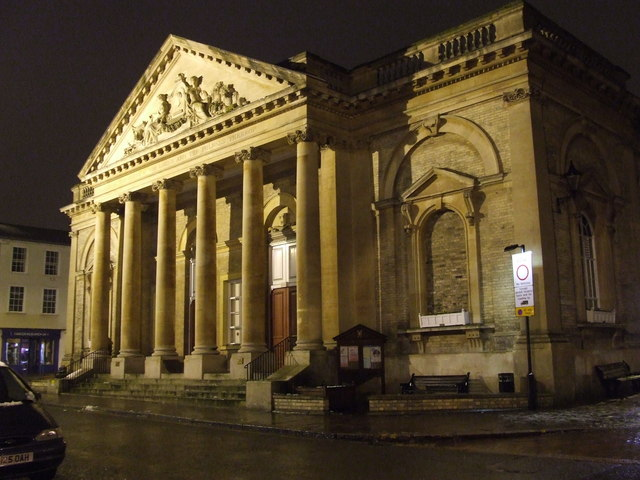
  The Bury St Edmunds Corn Exchange of 1861 at night
  Surprisingly this building is only listed Grade II. In white brick and limestone, probably from Ancaster in Lincolnshire, with Portland stone for the bases of the pillars. The building has a stone modillion cornice with balustrading over the north and south fronts. The south front, has a giant hexastyle Ionic portico with a pediment decorated by figures representing Agriculture. The wings flanking the portico have blocked arched headed windows with stone architraves and pediments on consoles. It was converted to shops in 1969–70 and the central corn exchange area is now a Wetherspoons public house.

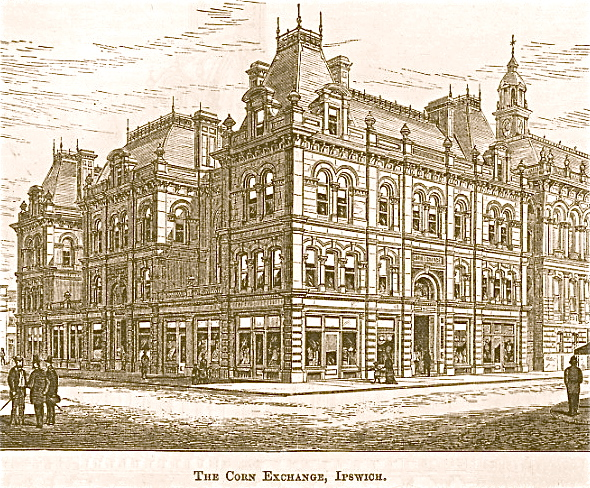
Corn Exchange, Ipswich 1880

- Ipswich Corn Exchange. Corn trading normally took place on Tuesdays in Ipswich and in the 18th century under a Market Cross in the Cornhill. A print shows the cross was surrounded by iron posts with a deal being struck "on the nail" – the nail being a flat-topped cast-iron post over which farmer and merchant shook hands at the agreed price. In 1793 some merchants moved into the Georgian Rotunda. As the name suggests, the Rotunda was a circular building, designed by George Gooding and modelled on the Halle au Blé in Paris (the central fruit and veg market). This was replaced by a purpose-built Corn Exchange (1812), also designed by Gooding which had a central open courtyard arrangement. The arrangement of an open court was disliked by the users, even the farmers with their reputation for working outside, so the corporation eventually (1849) conceded and refurbished the building. This 1849 refurbishment was by the architect Henry Woolnough, of Great Colman Street. Woolnough had a reputation for designing for clients with a very limited budget. The improved corn exchange lasted 30 years, accommodating an increasing number of merchants and becoming ever more crowded. The building was never ideal and the merchants continued to complain: about the unsuitability of the building, about the overcrowding and about parking. Eventually, the corporation built the present corn exchange behind the town hall in 1880.
- Haverhill Corn Exchange. Withersfield Road. Designed by Frank Whitmore and completed in 1889.

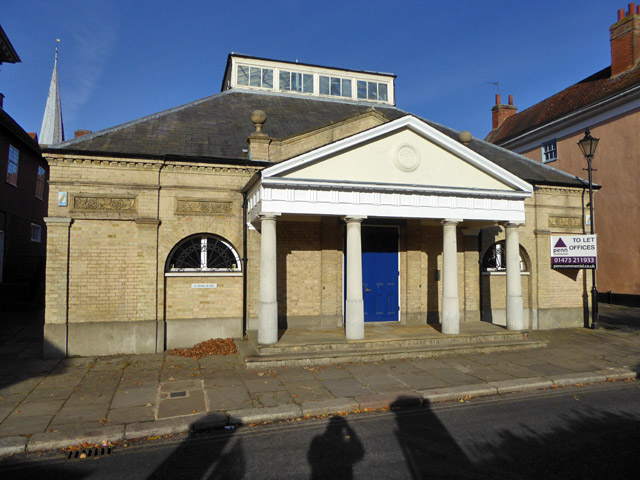
Former Corn Exchange, Hadleigh

- Hadleigh Corn Exchange, Market Place. An early example of 1813 and restored in 1895. A rectangular building of Suffolk brick with roof of slates on south and west sides, of glass on north and east sides, and surmounted by rectangular glass dome. East and west sides are divided into six panels, each with blocked arched recess. Tetrastyle Doric portico to the south. Presumably originally with an open rectangular interior courtyard. It is now an estate agent.

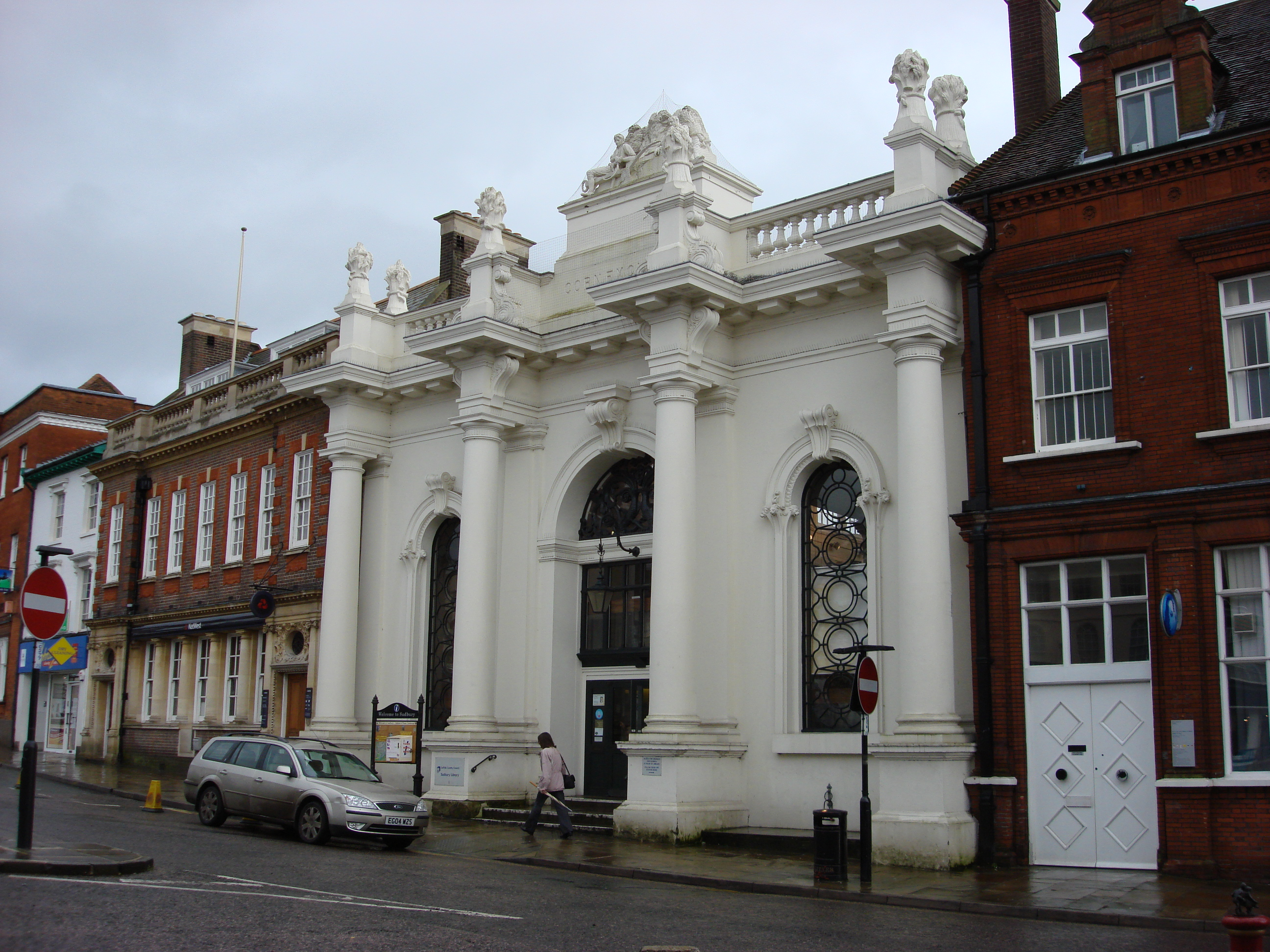
Corn Exchange, Sudbury, 1841

- Sudbury Corn Exchange, now public library. Listed Grade II*. Baroque revival style. An elaborate Victorian stone building, 1841 by H E Kendall with a facade of four columns linked by a heavy entablature and each column surmounted by a pinnacle in form of a sheaf of corn. There is balustrade between the two outer columns. To the front is a large central arched doorway with an elaborate fanlight and ornate arched window with outer columns on each side. The centre is higher and is surmounted by a group of labourers, sickles and sheaves.

=== Surrey ===
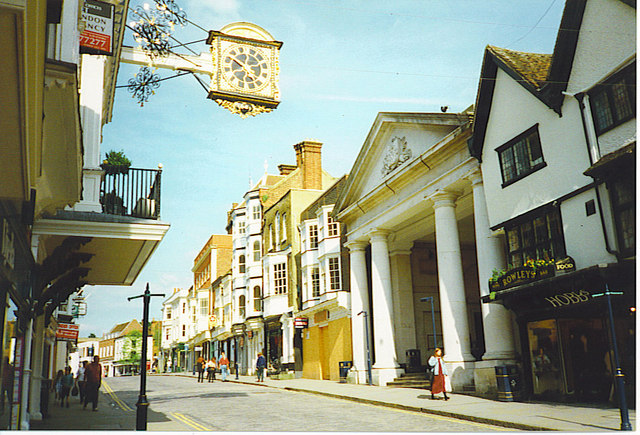
Tunsgate, Guildford High Street

- Guildford Corn Exchange. High Street. Neoclassical building erected in 1818; it was largely demolished in the 1930s, leaving only the portico standing.

=== Tyne and Wear ===
- Newcastle Corn Exchange. St Nicholas Square. Built in 1839. Subsumed with Newcastle Town Hall in 1863.

=== West Midlands ===
- Birmingham Corn Exchange. High Street, between Carr's Lane and Castle Street. Built in 1847. Neoclassical design. Demolished as part of the 20th-century redevelopment of Birmingham and subsumed within a site now occupied by a Marks & Spencer shop.

=== West Sussex ===
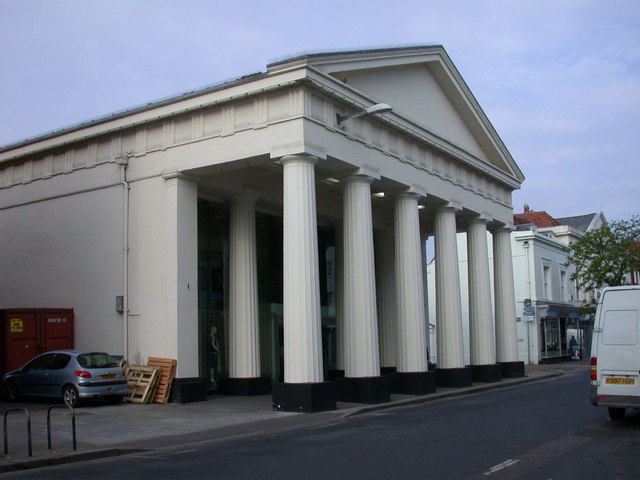
The Corn Exchange, Chichester

- Chichester Corn Exchange. Doric Grecian style. Grade II*. Built in 1830. Now the Granada Cinema. Narthex built across the pavement with six-fluted Greek Doric columns supporting an entablature with moulding to frieze cornice and pediment. There are for engaged columns and two pilasters behind the arcade. Frieze and cornice return southwards along eastern and western fronts of the building. There is a southern brick built part of the Exchange, presumably earlier and listed Grade II, to the south. This is now converted to offices.

=== Wiltshire ===
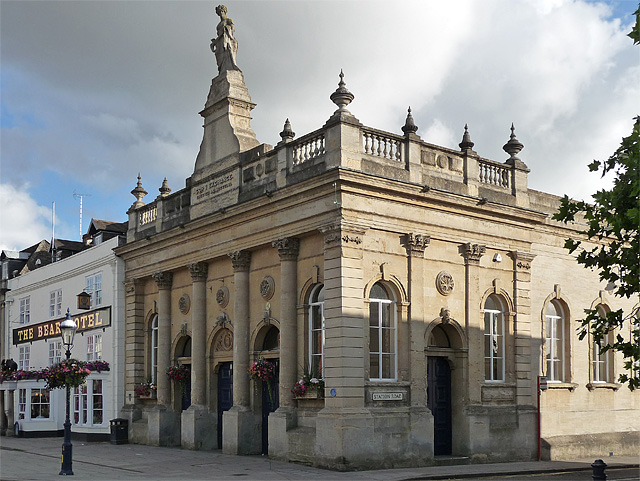
Corn Exchange, Devizes 1857

- Devizes Corn Exchange. Market Place. Baroque revival style. Dated 1857, by William Hill of Leeds. Large single storey hall with Bath stone front of four semi-engaged Corinthian columns and rusticated angle piers on a projecting plinth, supporting an entablature and stone balustrade. with stone urns at corners and at the centre a statue of Ceres on tall curved base with moulded capping and swag and cartouche ornament. Double doors in arched openings with "masked" keystones. On the north side with a long range of round headed windows, the end bays and the centre flanked by pilasters, the parapet with urns repeated over each of these sections. Market Cross and the Fountain form a group.
- Salisbury Corn Exchange. Market Place. 1859. Redeveloped as a shopping mall, library and art gallery in the 1970s.

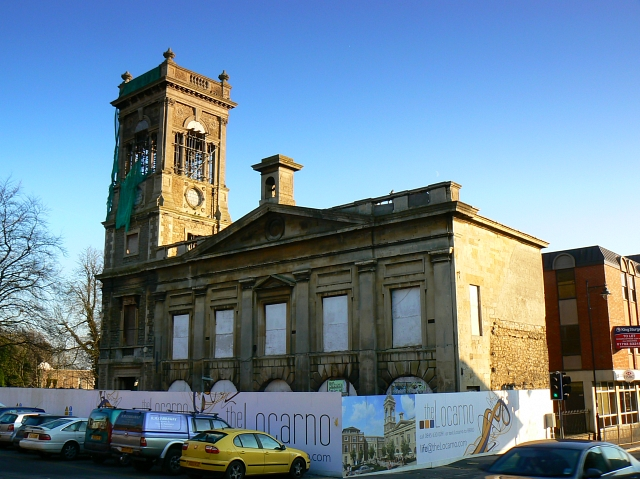
Swindon Corn Exchange, The Square, High Street, Swindon

- Swindon Corn Exchange. 1866. Former town hall, The Square, High Street, Swindon. The Grecian town hall was built 1852–54 and the Italianate tower (left) and corn exchange (behind the tower, not visible) were added 1866. In subsequent decades the building was a cinema, dance hall, wine merchant and bingo hall. It has been disused since the 1980s and more recently has undergone arson attacks.

=== West Yorkshire ===
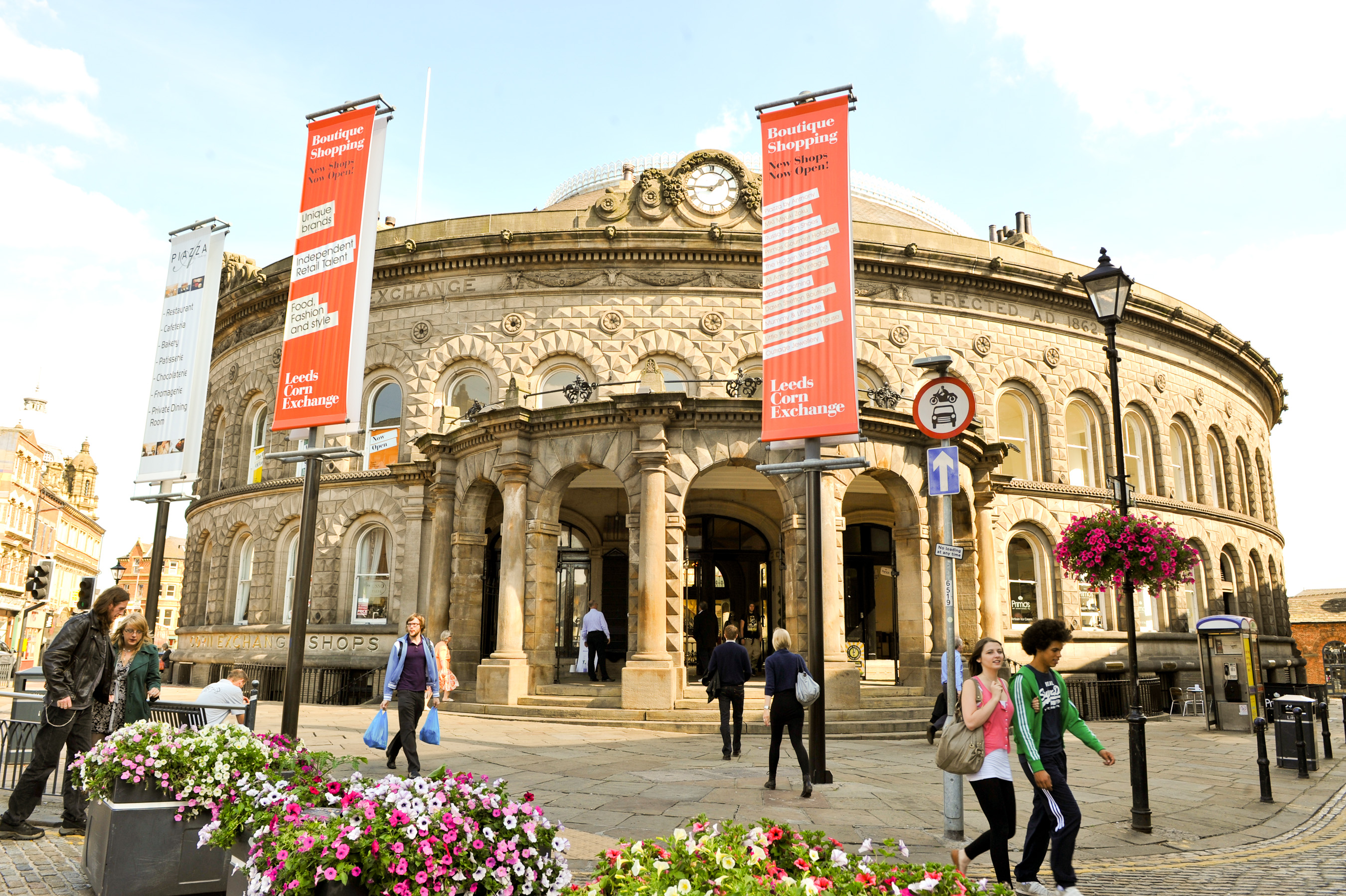
Leeds Corn Exchange

- Leeds Corn Exchange. 1862. Designed by Cuthbert Brodrick, a Hull architect best known for Leeds Town Hall, this Grade I listed structure was completed in 1862. The dome design was based on that of the Bourse de commerce of Paris by François-Joseph Bélanger and François Brunet, completed in 1811.
- Wakefield The first corn exchange was built in 1820 by the bank of Wentworth, Chaloner and Rishworth, but the bank became insolvent in 1825 and the building was seized by the bank's creditors. The building was later the premises of the Yorkshire Penny Bank and demolished in the 1930s. The exchange was replaced in 1837 by a much larger building in Grecian Revival style by the architect W. L. Moffat of Doncaster and Edinburgh. The Corn Exchange was built by the Wakefield Exchange Building Company. The corn trade in Wakefield was extremely prosperous and relied largely on river trade. It is recorded in 1843 that there were about three hundred vessels of fifty to ninety tons each and that the corn-market held on Friday is second only to that of London and .. frequently... the quantity sold is greater than that at Mark Lane and that there are ranges of large corn-warehouses on the banks of the river. Corn came from eastern countries up the Aire and Calder Navigation and was sold via the exchange floor (lower floor) and ferried on to Manchester and the surrounding mill towns. The corn Exchange was enlarged in 1864. In 1909 when the ground floor was leased to the Wakefield Roller-Skating Syndicate and became a skating rink. In 1910 the upper floor was leased by London and General Electric Theatres Ltd and converted into Wakefield's first cinema. Trading in Corn seems to have ceased at this time. It was known first as the Electric, and later as the Grand Electric. The Grand Electric was badly damaged by fire in 1957 and never reopened. Essoldo sold the whole building to developers, and it was demolished in 1962 to make way for a C&A store.

=== Worcestershire ===
- Evesham

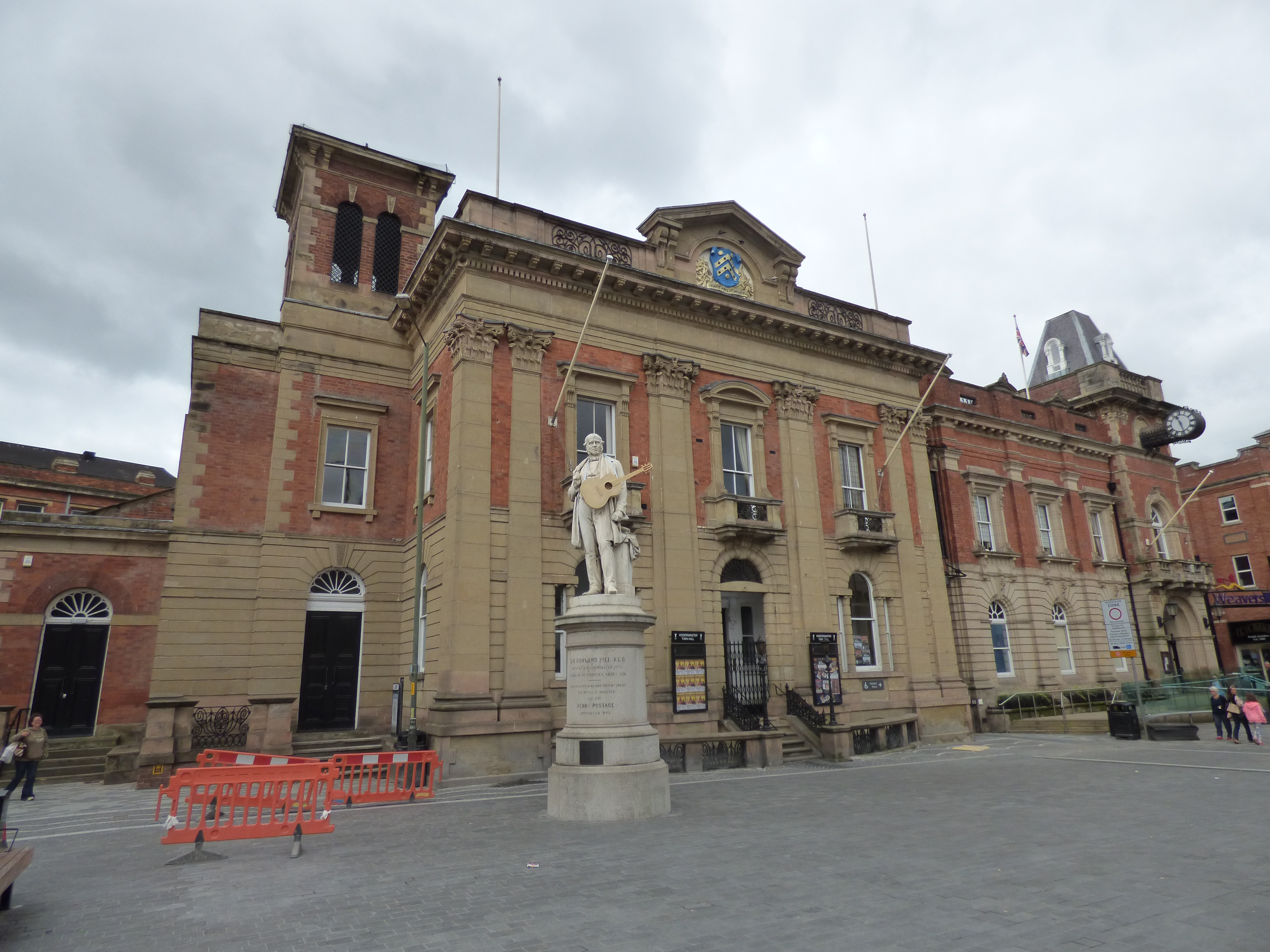
Kidderminster Town Hall and Corn Exchange

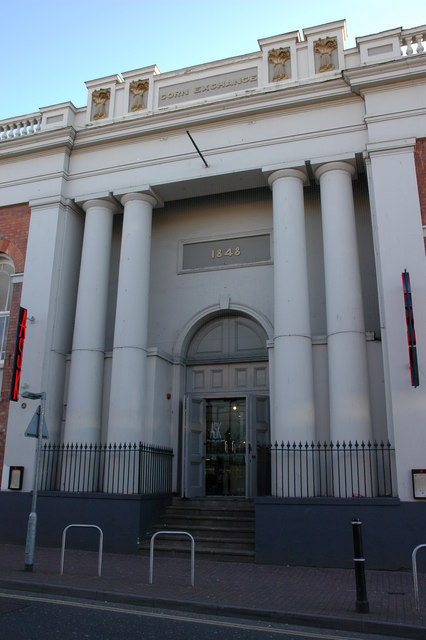
Corn Exchange, Worcester

- Kidderminster Town Hall and Corn Exchange (1865). Formerly Corn Exchange, music hall and public rooms. Now District Council offices. By the architects Bidlake and Lovall. Two storeys. In brick with stone dressings. The facade consists of paired giant pilasters at the ends and triple ones flank centre. Ground floor in channelled rustication. The first floor has three windows with cornices on consoles decorated with the centre window with a segmental pediment, stone balconies. The centre pediment has the town coat of arms, and parapet is inset with iron grilles. Dentil cornice on brackets. There is a bell tower on the left and a one-storey section on the corner.
- Worcester Corn Exchange. Angel Street. Corn exchange (1848), now converted to a shopping mall. Reddish-pink brick in Flemish bond with red brick arches, stuccoed columns and entablature. Single-storey frontage with five bays on a plinth. Giant Tuscan pilasters to ends and outer bays and in the centre are two pairs of Tuscan columns in antis. Flight of steps up to central entrance with crowning entablature surmounted by balustrade with bulbous balusters and central panel with raised letters: "CORN EXCHANGE" in between plinths with sheafs of corn.

== Literature ==
- Antram N (revised), Pevsner N & Harris J, (1989), The Buildings of England: Lincolnshire, Yale University Press.
- Colvin H. A (1995), Biographical Dictionary of British Architects 1600-1840. Yale University Press, 3rd edition London.
- George B. (2018) Lincoln's Cornhill Quarter : A surprisingly rich heritage. Privately published by Lincolncoln Co-operative Society.
- Orbell J (2017) A Handsome and Substantial Building- A History of Bury St Edmunds Corn Exchange.
- Sheardown W. (1979) The Marts and Markets at Doncaster, their rise, progress, sources and supply.
