= Corn exchange =

Building where farmers and merchants traded cereal grains

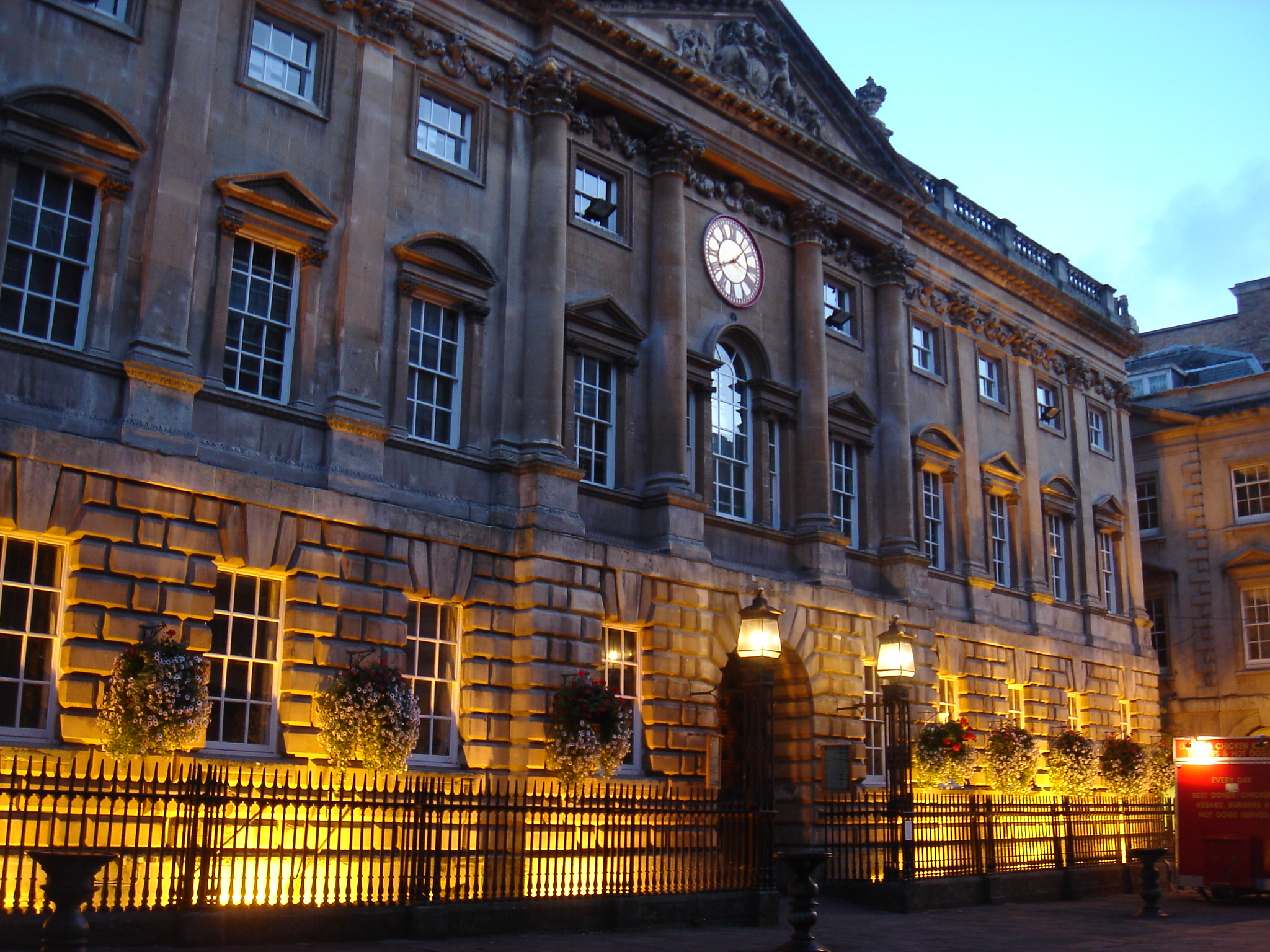
The Exchange in Bristol

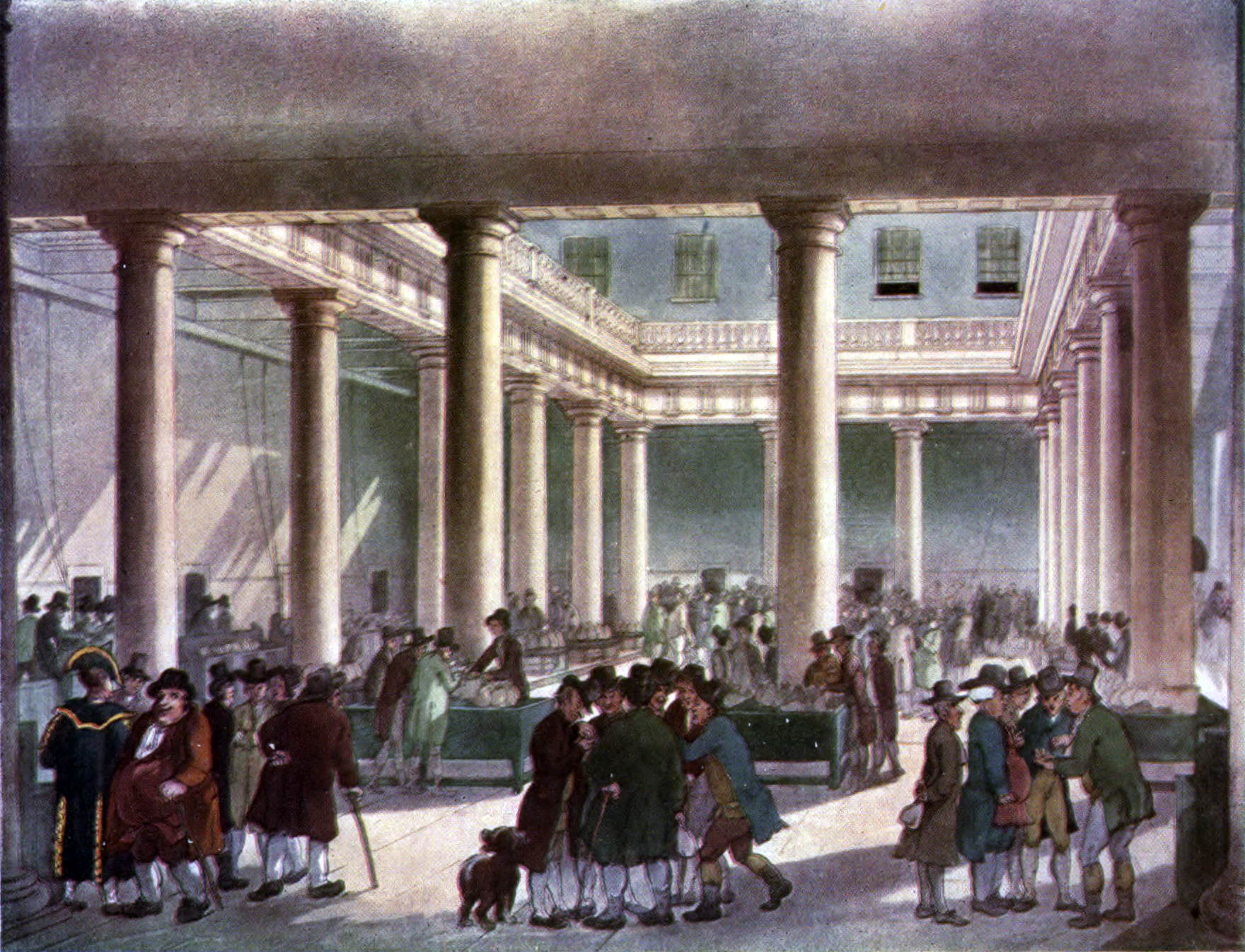
Corn Exchange, London circa 1809

A corn exchange is a building where merchants trade grains. The word "corn" in British English denotes all cereal grains, such as wheat and barley; in the United States these buildings were called grain exchanges. Such trade was common in towns and cities across the British Isles until the 19th century, but as the trade became centralised in the 20th century many such buildings were used for other purposes. Several have since become historical landmarks.

In the United States, the Minneapolis Grain Exchange is still used to manage the commodities and futures exchange of grain products.

== History in England ==
Corn exchanges were initially held as open markets normally controlled by the town or city authorities. Dedicated corn exchanges start appearing in the earlier part of the 18th century, increasing greatly following the repeal of the Corn Laws in 1846. They declined after the Great Depression of British Agriculture in the late 19th century.

== List of corn exchanges ==
=== Australia ===
- Corn Exchange, Sydney

=== Canada ===
- Winnipeg Grain Exchange

=== Ireland ===
- Corn Exchange, Athy
- Corn Exchange, Dublin
- Corn Exchange, Wexford

=== United Kingdom ===
==== England ====
See also: Corn exchanges in England

- Corn Exchange, Alford
- Corn Exchange, Aylesbury
- Corn Exchange, Banbury
- Corn Exchange, Barton-upon-Humber
- Corn Exchange, Basingstoke
- Corn Exchange, Beccles
- Corn Exchange, Bedford
- Corn Exchange, Berwick-upon-Tweed
- Corn Exchange, Beverley
- Corn Exchange, Bishop's Stortford
- Corn Exchange, Blandford Forum
- Corn Exchange, Bourne
- Corn Exchange, Bridgwater
- Corn Exchange, Brighton
- Corn Exchange, Bristol
- Corn Exchange, Bury St Edmunds
- Corn Exchange, Camborne
- Corn Exchange, Cambridge
- Corn Exchange, Chard
- Corn Exchange, Chichester
- Corn Exchange, Cirencester
- Corn Exchange, Colchester
- Corn Exchange, Derby
- Corn Exchange, Dereham
- Corn Exchange, Devizes
- Corn Exchange, Diss
- Corn Exchange, Doncaster
- Corn Exchange, Dorchester
- Corn Exchange, Driffield
- Corn Exchange, Exeter
- Corn Exchange, Fakenham
- Corn Exchange, Faringdon
- Corn Exchange, Grantham
- Corn Exchange, Guildford
- Corn Exchange, Hadleigh
- Corn Exchange, Harleston
- Corn Exchange, Haverhill
- Corn Exchange, Helston
- Corn Exchange, Hertford
- Corn Exchange, Hexham
- Corn Exchange, Hitchin
- Corn Exchange, Ipswich
- Corn Exchange, Kettering
- Corn Exchange, Kidderminster
- Corn Exchange, King's Lynn
- Corn Exchange, Leeds
- Corn Exchange, Leicester
- Corn Exchange, Lewes
- Corn Exchange, Lichfield
- Corn Exchange, Lincoln
- Corn Exchange, Liverpool
- Corn Exchange, London
- Corn Exchange, Long Sutton
- Corn Exchange, Lostwithiel
- Corn Exchange, Maidstone
- Corn Exchange, Malton
- Corn Exchange, Manchester
- Corn Exchange, Manningtree
- Corn Exchange, Market Rasen
- Corn Exchange, Melton Mowbray
- Corn Exchange, Much Wenlock
- Corn Exchange, Newark-on-Trent
- Corn Exchange, Newbury
- Corn Exchange, Newcastle upon Tyne
- Corn Exchange, Newton Abbot
- Corn Exchange, Nottingham
- Corn Exchange, Oxford
- Corn Exchange, Preston
- Corn Exchange, Reading
- Corn Exchange, Rochester
- Corn Exchange, Rochford
- Corn Exchange, Romsey
- Corn Exchange, Ross-on-Wye
- Corn Exchange, Royston
- Corn Exchange, Saffron Walden
- Corn Exchange, Salisbury
- Corn Exchange, Sandbach
- Corn Exchange, St Albans
- Corn Exchange, St Ives
- Corn Exchange, Stamford
- Corn Exchange, Stow-on-the-Wold
- Corn Exchange, Sudbury
- Corn Exchange, Swaffham
- Corn Exchange, Swindon
- Corn Exchange, Tavistock
- Corn Exchange, Tewkesbury
- Corn Exchange, Thrapston
- Corn Exchange, Tonbridge
- Corn Exchange, Tunbridge Wells
- Corn Exchange, Wallingford
- Corn Exchange, Winchester
- Corn Exchange, Witney
- Corn Exchange, Worcester
- Corn Exchange, Worksop
- Corn Exchange, York

==== Wales ====
- Corn Exchange, Cardigan
- Corn Exchange, Newport

==== Scotland ====
- Corn Exchange, Arbroath
- Corn Exchange, Biggar
- Corn Exchange, Cupar
- Corn Exchange, Dalkeith
- Corn Exchange, Edinburgh
- Corn Exchange, Haddington
- Corn Exchange, Kelso
- Corn Exchange, Leith
- Corn Exchange, Melrose
- Corn Exchange, Kilmarnock

=== United States ===
- Minneapolis Grain Exchange
- Philadelphia Corn Exchange
- Sioux City Grain Exchange

== See also ==
- Grain trade
- Commodity market
