= Corn Exchange, Beccles =

Commercial building in Beccles, Suffolk, England

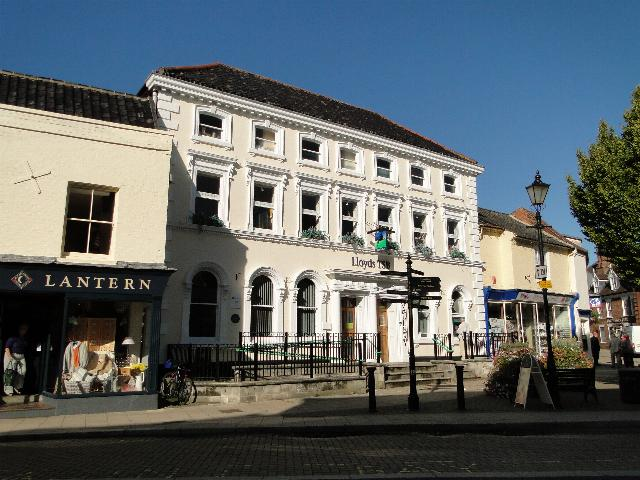
- Corn Exchange, Beccles

- Shown in Suffolk
- 52.4572°N 1.5637°E
- Location: Exchange Square, Beccles

History
- Built: c.1810

Site notes
- Architectural style: Italianate style

Listed Building – Grade II
- Official name: Premises occupied by Lloyds Bank
- Designated: 22 September 1971
- Reference no.: 1298984

The Corn Exchange is a commercial building in Exchange Square in Beccles, Suffolk, England. The structure, which is now used as a branch of Lloyds Bank, is a Grade II listed building.

== History ==
The building was commissioned a local landowner, Robert Rede: the Redes were a prominent family in the town who had become the lords of the manor following dissolution of the monasteries in the 16th century. He acquired the site in 1794 and arranged for a private dwelling to be erected there in 1810. The property was acquired by an actor and theatre manager, David Fischer, in 1819, as part of a project to establish a chain of theatres across East Anglia. Fisher converted the property into two residential units and a theatre which opened as the "New Play House" later that year.

The design involved a symmetrical main frontage of seven bays facing onto Sheepgate. On the ground floor, there were two centrally-placed doorways, giving access to the two residential units, both flanked by pilasters supporting entablatures decorated with triglyphs and surmounted by cornices. There were three bays to the left and two bays to the right, all fenestrated on the ground floor by round headed windows with architraves. The first floor was fenestrated by sash windows with window sills and cornices supported by brackets, and the second floor was fenestrated by segmentally headed windows with architraves and keystones. At roof level, there was a modillioned cornice and a hipped roof.

After Fisher died in 1832, the property continued to operate as a theatre until the building was auctioned in June 1844: it was acquired by Edward Lock of Hoddesdon in Hertfordshire who converted it into a corn exchange. He removed the theatre fittings and demolished the internal walls to create one large room for corn merchants to conduct their trade. The trading room was 63 feet (19 m) long and 34 feet (10 m) wide.

The building was also used for public events: speakers included two members of parliament, Jasper More and Clare Sewell Read, who addressed a meeting of farmers, who were concerned about the Malt tax and the Game laws, in January 1867. The use of the building as a corn exchange declined significantly in the wake of the Great Depression of British Agriculture in the late 19th century. The property was occupied by Capital and Counties Bank in 1907, and then by Lloyds Bank, after Capital and Counties Bank was acquired by Lloyds Bank in 1918.

== See also ==
- Corn exchanges in England
