= Corn Exchange, Bishop's Stortford =

Commercial building in Bishop's Stortford, Hertfordshire, England

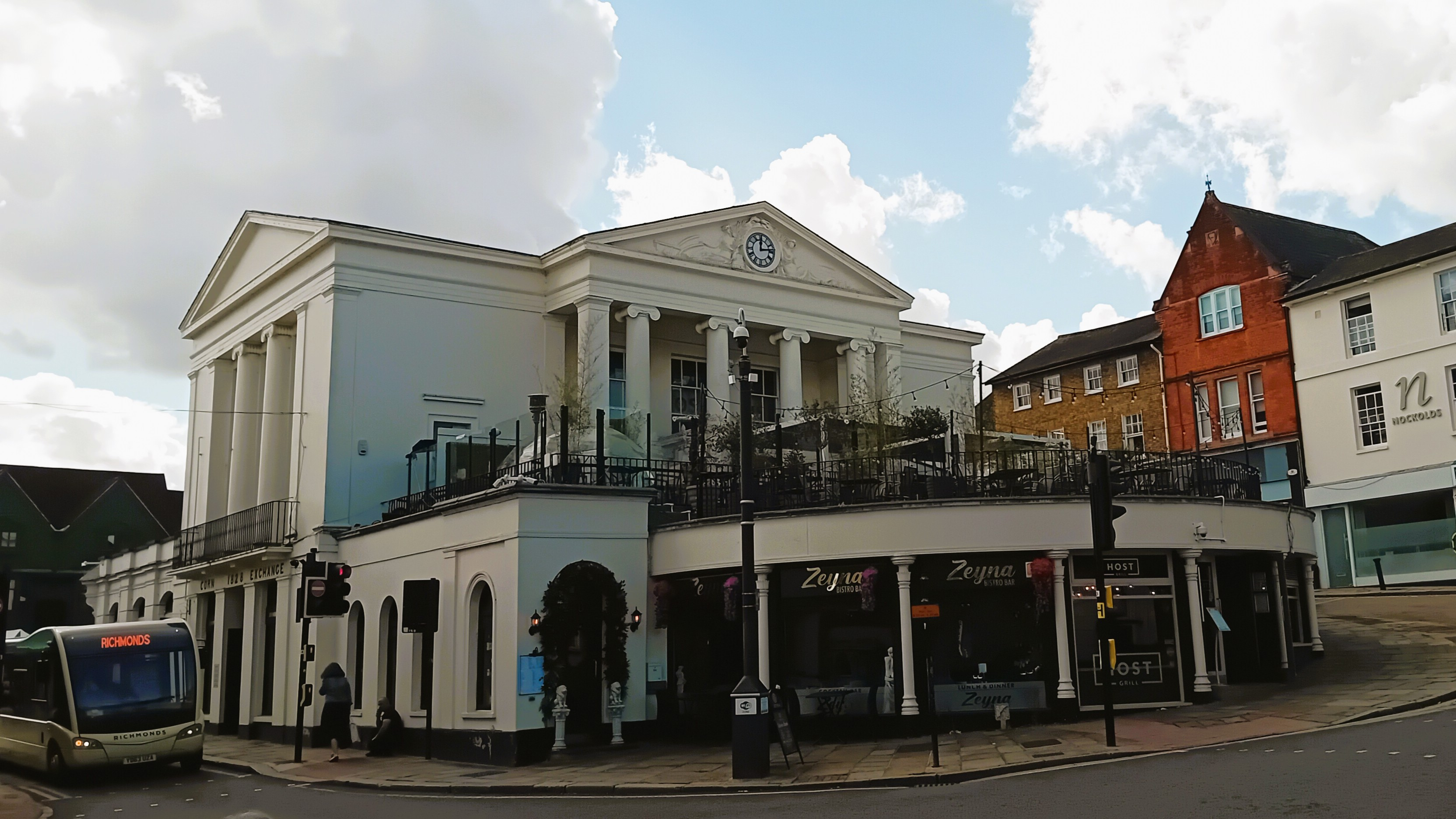
- Corn Exchange, Bishop's Stortford

- Shown in Hertfordshire
- 51.8710°N 0.1588°E
- Location: Market Square, Bishop's Stortford

History
- Built: 1828

Site notes
- Architect: Lewis Vulliamy
- Architectural style: Greek Revival style

Listed Building – Grade II
- Official name: Halifax Building Society
- Designated: 18 October 1949
- Reference no.: 1102406

The Corn Exchange is a commercial building in the Market Square in Bishop's Stortford, Hertfordshire, England. The structure now accommodates shops and offices. It is a Grade II listed building under the name Halifax Building Society.

== History ==
In the early 1820s, a group of local businessmen decided to form a private company to finance and commission a corn exchange for the town. The site they selected in the Market Square was occupied by the King's Head Inn which dated from 1680.

The new building was designed by Lewis Vulliamy in the Greek Revival style, built in Roman concrete and completed in 1828. The main structure was erected above a podium which projected to the north and south. The north end of the podium, which was circular, provided access to the main trading floor through a small porch, which was surmounted by a statue of the Roman goddess of agriculture, Ceres. Set back, high above the podium, there was a tetrastyle portico in antis, formed by Ionic order columns supporting an entablature and a pediment with a clock and a pair of reclining figures in the tympanum. There was also a similar but less elaborate portico, with just two Ionic order columns, on the east side.

The use of the building as a corn exchange declined significantly in the wake of the Great Depression of British Agriculture in the late 19th century. Instead, it was used as a venue for meetings. The local board held its first meeting, under the chairmanship of Jones Gifford Nash, at the corn exchange on 23 February 1867, and petty sessions were held there on a regular basis in the late 19th century.

Significant alterations were made to the building in 1890. The porch with the statue of Ceres was removed and a glass rotunda was erected above the north end of the podium. Meanwhile, the south end of the podium was occupied by Capital and Counties Bank, which became Lloyds Bank in 1934. During the Second World War, the building was used as a synagogue for Jewish refugees evacuated from London.

After the corn exchange ceased trading in 1959, the building was acquired by Hertfordshire County Council. However, it soon became dilapidated and, in 1967, the council recommended its demolition. The proposal was strongly opposed by the Bishop's Stortford Civic Society and the Bishop's Stortford History Society. After the proposal was withdrawn, the building was subsequently acquired by a developer. A major programme of works, involving the removal of the glass rotunda and the conversion of much of the building into shops and offices, was completed in 1974. The conversion was carried out to a design by Ronald Cox Associates and D. A. Burt Associates for which they received a European Heritage Award in 1974. Lloyds Bank vacated the north end of the podium and re-located to North Street at around the same time. A restaurant, bar and entertainment venue known as "Host" opened in the building in July 2000.

== See also ==
- Corn exchanges in England
