= Corn Exchange, Haverhill =

Commercial building in Haverhill, Suffolk, England

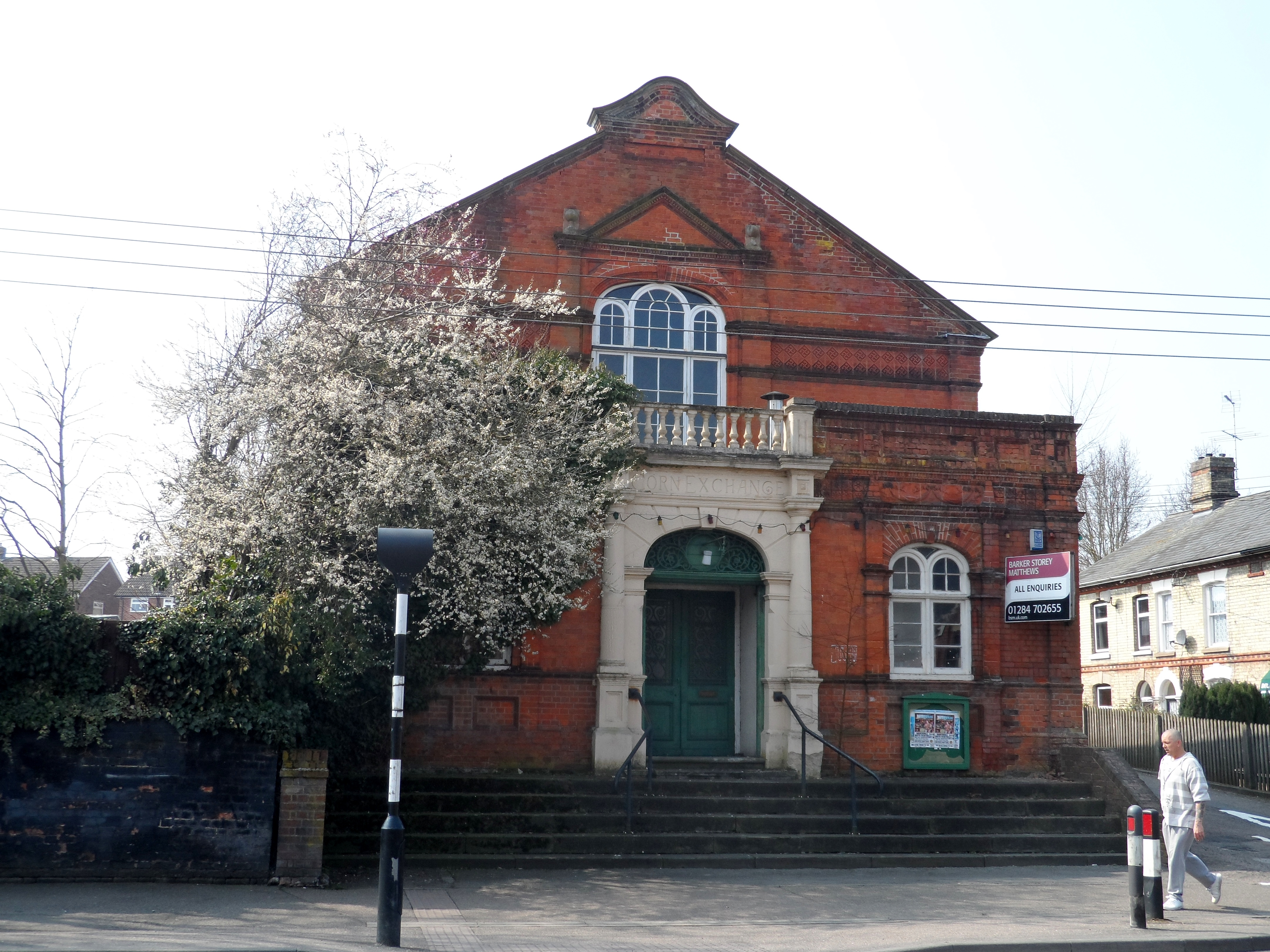
- Corn Exchange, Haverhill

- Shown in Suffolk
- 52.0849°N 0.4357°E
- Location: Withersfield Road, Haverhill

History
- Built: 1889

Site notes
- Architect: Frank Whitmore
- Architectural style: Renaissance Revival style

Listed Building – Grade II
- Official name: Corn Exchange
- Designated: 9 May 1973
- Reference no.: 1375531

The Corn Exchange is a commercial building in Withersfield Road in Haverhill, Suffolk, England. The structure, which is currently vacant and deteriorating, is a Grade II listed building.

== History ==
The first corn exchange in the town was erected in the High Street just to the south of St Mary's Parish Church in 1857. However, in the mid-1880s, a group of local businessmen decided to form a private company, to be known as the "Haverhill Corn Exchange Company Limited", to finance and commission a new and more substantial corn exchange for the town. The site they selected was the forecourt of the old livestock market.

The new building was designed by Frank Whitmore in the Renaissance Revival style, built in red brick and completed in 1889. The design involved a symmetrical main frontage of three bays facing onto Withersfield Road. The central bay featured a short flight of steps leading up to a round-headed opening with voussoirs and a keystone flanked by Doric order columns supporting an entablature, inscribed with the words "Corn Exchange", and a balustrade. The other bays were fenestrated by a bi-partite round headed windows on the ground floor. The first floor was well set back in relation to the ground floor and was fenestrated by a tri-partite segmentally headed window with an architrave and a keystone. There was a gable above which was surmounted a double ogee-shaped pediment. The architectural historian, Nikolaus Pevsner, was unimpressed with the design which he described as being "of little merit".

The use of the building as a corn exchange declined significantly in the wake of the Great Depression of British Agriculture in the late 19th century. Instead, it was used as a community events centre, before being acquired by St Felix Catholic Church for use as their social club. St Felix Catholic Church then sold the building to a developer to fund a new church in Princess Way in 2006. However, the new owner failed to maintain the building and, after it remained vacant and deteriorating for over a decade, St Edmundsbury Borough Council served a notice on the owners, in May 2017, demanding that repairs be carried out. Haverhill Town Council subsequently considered acquiring the dilapidated building but, in October 2017, abandoned its plans to do so after the owner's lenders decided to block any proposed sale.

== See also ==
- Corn exchanges in England
