= Corn Exchange, Rochford =

Commercial building in Rochford, Essex, England

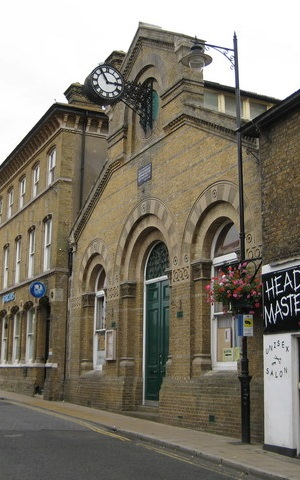
- Corn Exchange, Rochford

- Shown in Essex
- 51.5821°N 0.7061°E
- Location: West Street, Rochford

History
- Built: 1866

Site notes
- Architect: Frederic Chancellor
- Architectural style: Italianate style

Listed Building – Grade II
- Official name: Women's Institute Hall (formerly the Corn Exchange)
- Designated: 13 January 1988
- Reference no.: 1168355

The Corn Exchange, also known as the Women's Institute Hall, is a commercial building in West Street in Rochford, Essex, England. The structure, which is now used by the local branch of the Women's Institute, is a Grade II listed building.

== History ==
In 1865, a group of local businessmen decided to form a company, to be known as the "Rochford Corn Exchange Company", to finance and commission a purpose-built corn exchange for the town. The site they selected, on the south side of West Street, had been occupied by the Vernon's Head Inn.

The new building was designed by Frederic Chancellor in the Italianate style, built in yellow brick and was completed in 1866. The design involved a symmetrical main frontage of three bays facing onto West Street. The central bay featured a round headed opening containing a double door with an ornate wrought iron grille in the tympanum flanked by pilasters with foliate capitals and surmounted by voussoirs. The outer bays were fenestrated by round headed sash windows which were also flanked by pilasters and surmounted by voussoirs. There was a gable above which featured a raised apex containing a circular panel within a brick arch.

The use of the building as a corn exchange declined significantly in the wake of the Great Depression of British Agriculture in the late 19th century. However, it continued to be used for public meetings. It was the venue for the meeting of the Provincial Grand Lodge of Essex on 20 July 1875, and the venue for a public meeting, at which Arthur Stride, the general manager of the London, Tilbury and Southend Railway, presented proposals for a new Shenfield–Southend line, in March 1883.

A projecting clock, intended to commemorate the Diamond Jubilee of Queen Victoria, was installed in the gable in 1897. During the First World War, the building was acquired by Augusta Tawke of Bullwood Hall, who initially used it as a laundry before letting it out as a garage and repair shop. Tawke sold the building to a Miss Meeson, founder of the Rochford branch of the Women's Institute in 1924. Meeson allowed it be used as a canning factory for locally produced jam during the Second World War. It was subsequently used as a community events venue hosting farmers' markets, boxing matches, and Women's Institute meetings. An extensive refurbishment of the roof of the building was completed in September 2016.

== See also ==
- Corn exchanges in England
