= Albert Hall, Colchester =

Commercial building in Colchester, Essex, England

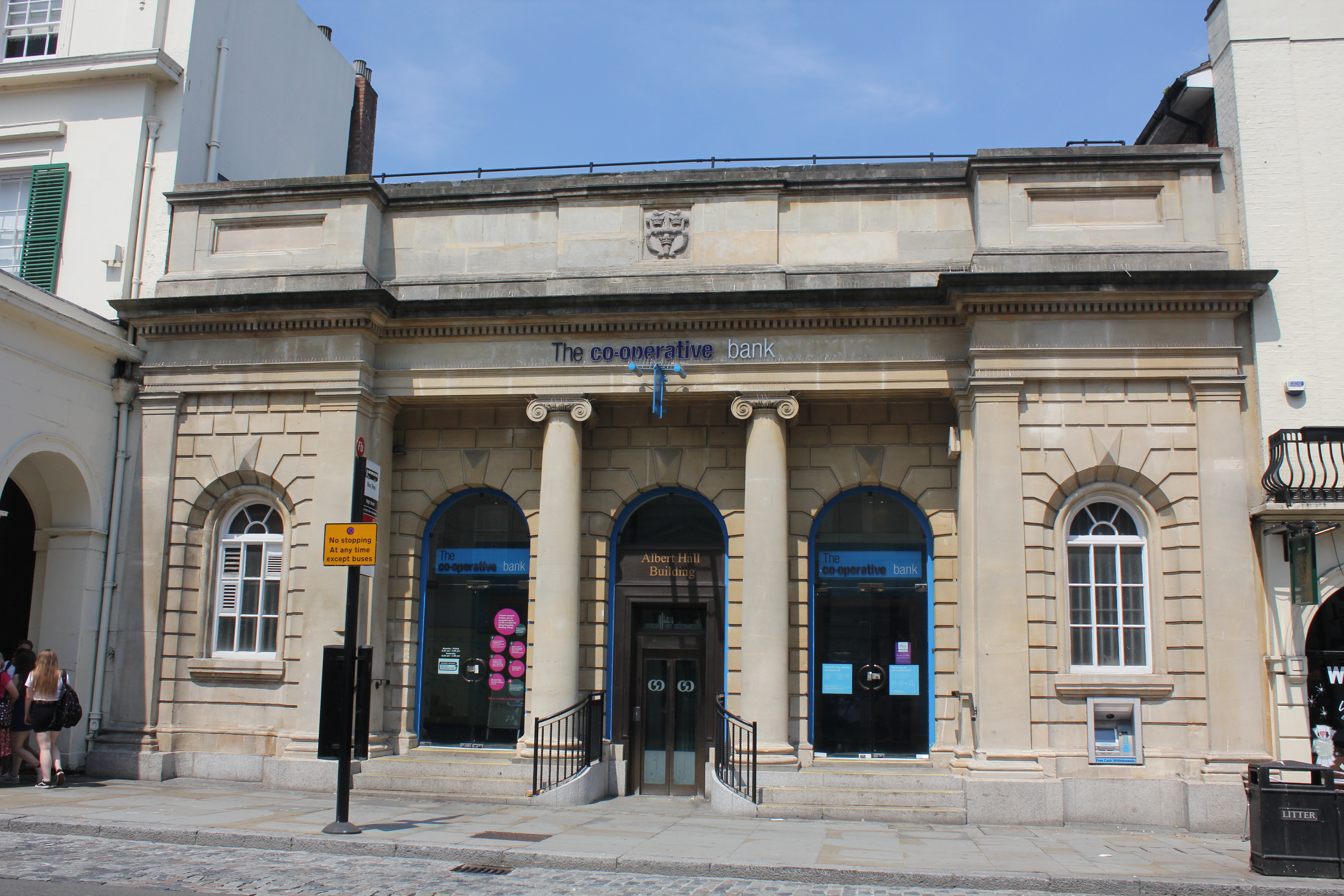
- Albert Hall, Colchester

- Shown in Essex
- 51.8898°N 0.8971°E
- Location: High Street, Colchester

History
- Built: 1845

Site notes
- Architect: Raphael Brandon
- Architectural style: Neoclassical style

Listed Building – Grade II
- Official name: The Albert Hall
- Designated: 2 December 1971
- Reference no.: 1337737

The Albert Hall is a commercial building in the High Street, Colchester, Essex, England. The structure, which was commissioned as a corn exchange and is now used as a bank, is a Grade II listed building.

== History ==
The first corn exchange in the town was designed by David Laing and was erected at the west end of the High Street in 1820. In the early 1840s, civic officials decided that the old corn exchange was inadequate and should be replaced by a new structure on an adjacent site to the east of the old building. (Note: The old corn exchange was subsequently converted for use as the Essex and Suffolk Fire Office.)

The current building was designed by Raphael Brandon in the neoclassical style, built in ashlar stone and was completed in 1845. The design involved a symmetrical main frontage of five bays facing onto the High Street. The central section of three bays, which was recessed, featured three round headed openings separated by Ionic order columns supporting a frieze, an entablature, a modillioned cornice and a parapet. The outer bays featured niches containing life-size figures depicting agricultural workers and were flanked by Doric order pilasters. A statue of the goddess, Ceres, was initially placed at the centre of the parapet but the stone quickly became eroded and the statue was removed.

The use of the building as a corn exchange declined significantly in the wake of the Great Depression of British Agriculture in the late 19th century. It closed as a corn exchange in 1884 and re-opened the following year as the Albert School of Art and Science. The life-size figures of agricultural workers were removed from the niches and were subsequently displayed outside a car park on Balkerne Hill. The building was requisitioned for use as a food control office i.e. rationing centre during the First World War and then re-opened as an events venue with a stage and gallery in 1926.

The building also operated as a cinema in the 1930s, and continued to host public events after the Second World War: performers included the rock band, The Who, in August 1965. It closed as an events venue in 1972, and served as a stationery shop, operated by Cullingford and Company, into the late-1970s. After a major programme of refurbishment works in the 1980s, the building re-opened as a branch of The Co-operative Bank and as the local office of General Accident in 1991.

== See also ==
- Corn exchanges in England
