= Corn Exchange, Ross-on-Wye =

Commercial building in Ross-on-Wye, Herefordshire, England

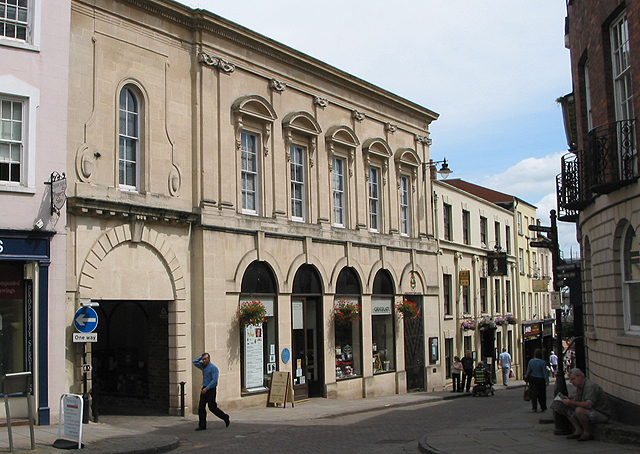
- Corn Exchange, Ross-on-Wye

- Shown in Herefordshire
- 51.9144°N 2.5852°W
- Location: High Street, Ross-on-Wye

History
- Built: 1862

Site notes
- Architect: Thomas Nicholson
- Architectural style: Neoclassical style

Listed Building – Grade II
- Official name: 7, High Street
- Designated: 4 August 1972
- Reference no.: 1098708

The Corn Exchange is a commercial building in the High Street in Ross-on-Wye, Herefordshire, England. The structure, which is now used as a bookshop and as the offices of Ross-on-Wye Town Council, is a Grade II listed building.

== History ==
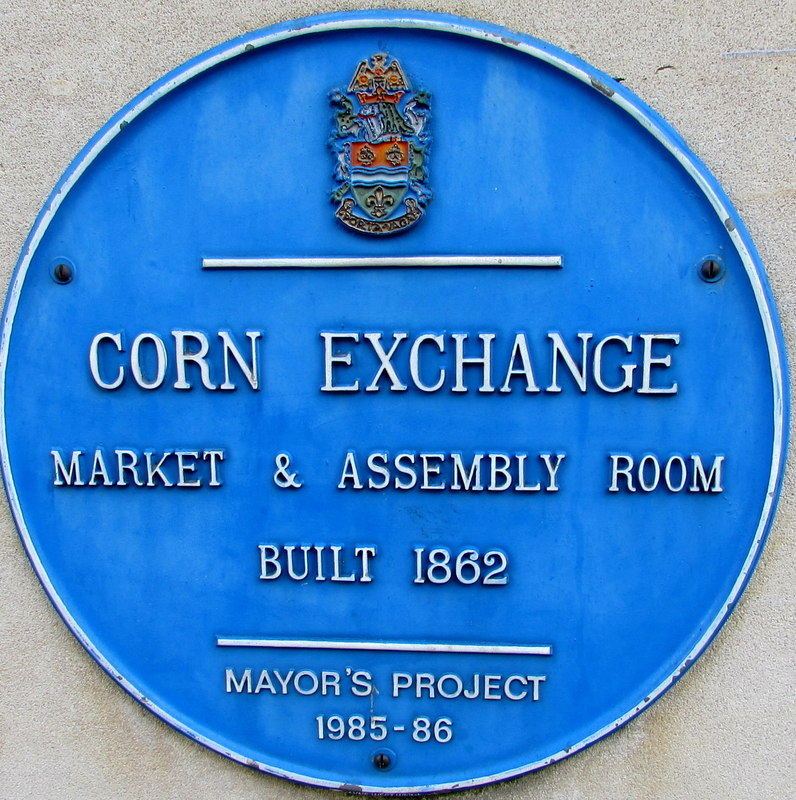
Blue plaque on the building

In the mid-19th century, a group of local businessmen decided to form a private company, known as the "Ross Corn Exchange and Public Buildings Company", to finance and commission a purpose-built corn exchange for the town. The site they selected was on the north side of the High Street.

The new building was designed by Thomas Nicholson in the neoclassical style, built in ashlar stone and was completed in 1862. The design involved an asymmetrical main frontage of six bays facing onto the High Street. The left-hand bay contained a round-headed carriage entrance with voussoirs on the ground floor, and a round-headed window with an elaborate surround on the first floor. The right-hand section of five bays contained round headed openings with voussoirs and keystones on the ground floor and sash windows with segmental pediments supported by brackets on the first floor. The first-floor windows were separated by Ionic order pilasters supporting an entablature and a dentilled cornice. Internally, the principal rooms were at the rear of the building; there was a market hall on the ground floor and an assembly room on the first floor.

The use of the building as a corn exchange declined significantly in the wake of the Great Depression of British Agriculture in the late 19th century. However, it continued to be used for public events: performers at that time included the D'Oyly Carte Opera Company. It was converted for cinema use, under the branding of "The New Theatre", in 1922, and hosted performances the Ross Operatic and Dramatic Society, before it was badly damaged by a fire in 1939.

After the Second World War, the ground floor of the front area was converted from a draper's shop to a car showroom. The large rear area, which had held the corn market and The New Theatre was partially rebuilt and became a car repair workshop. Ross-on-Wye Town Council subsequently converted part of the front area for use as its meeting place and offices. The ground floor of the front area was re-purposed for retail use and, in 2010, became the first branch of a new chain of bookshops, Rossiter Books. The large rear area was eventually converted into a licensed event space and micro brewery by the owners of the King's Head Hotel in 2022.

Notable works of art in the building include a portrait by an unknown artist of the local philanthropist, John Kyrle, sometimes referred to as The Man of Ross.

== See also ==
- Corn exchanges in England
