= Corn Exchange, Newport =

Agricultural Building in Newport, Wales

- Cyfnewid Ŷd Casnewydd (Welsh)
- Corn Exchange, Newport
- Interactive map of Corn Exchange, Newport
- 51.5897°N 2.9973°W
- Location: High Street, Newport

History
- Built: 1878

Site notes
- Architect: B. Lawrence / John Rutherford

Listed Building – Grade II
- Official name: Former Head Post Office
- Designated: 14 February 1985
- Reference no.: 3074
- Architectural style: English Baroque style

The Corn Exchange, Newport is a commercial building on the High Street of Newport, Wales. The building is currently used as a 500-seat music venue, but has its origins in a corn exchange that first opened in 1878. It is a Grade II listed building.

== History ==
=== Early history ===
In December 1869, the Chamber of Agriculture began discussions with local community members of Newport regarding the establishment of a Corn Exchange. However, it was agreed that there was not enough information to commence preparation of the plans. Eventually, design development was completed and construction started. The building was designed by architect B. Lawrence, a Newport resident. It cost over £4,000 to build and was officially opened by Charles Somerset, 8th Duke of Beaufort in September 1878. The building had been commissioned in memory of Charles Morgan, 1st Baron Tredegar and the exchange room featured carvings of the Tredegar family crest. It included a clock tower, cellars for offices, the exchange room, and several rooms to let, with the income going towards charitable causes. The building was owned by the Tredegar estate, with the Duke of Beaufort and other trustees agreeing to pay a peppercorn rent for 999 years.

The use of the building as a corn exchange declined significantly in the wake of the Great Depression of British Agriculture in the late 19th century.

=== Later use ===
Between 1907 and 1908 the complex was expanded to the west by the construction of a head post office to a design by John Rutherford in the English Baroque style. In the 1940s, it was expanded further to the west by the addition of the round-headed structure which accommodated a telephone exchange. After becoming semi-derelict, the complex was remodelled and refurbished with financial support from Cadw in the mid-1990s, and then served as the Chicago Rock café before becomming a shisha bar. It was later converted for commercial use as a series of offices.

By around 2020, the complex had become unused again. In December 2023, a proposal to turn it into a 500-seat capacity live music venue was submitted to Newport City Council for consideration. Businesses and members of the public were invited to become stakeholders in the venue for a limited time through the Corn Exchange Community Share Offer.

After raising over £70,000 through crowdfunding and support from Creative Wales, conversion was completed and the venue opened in March 2024.
