= Corn Exchange, Faringdon =

Commercial building in Faringdon, Oxfordshire, England

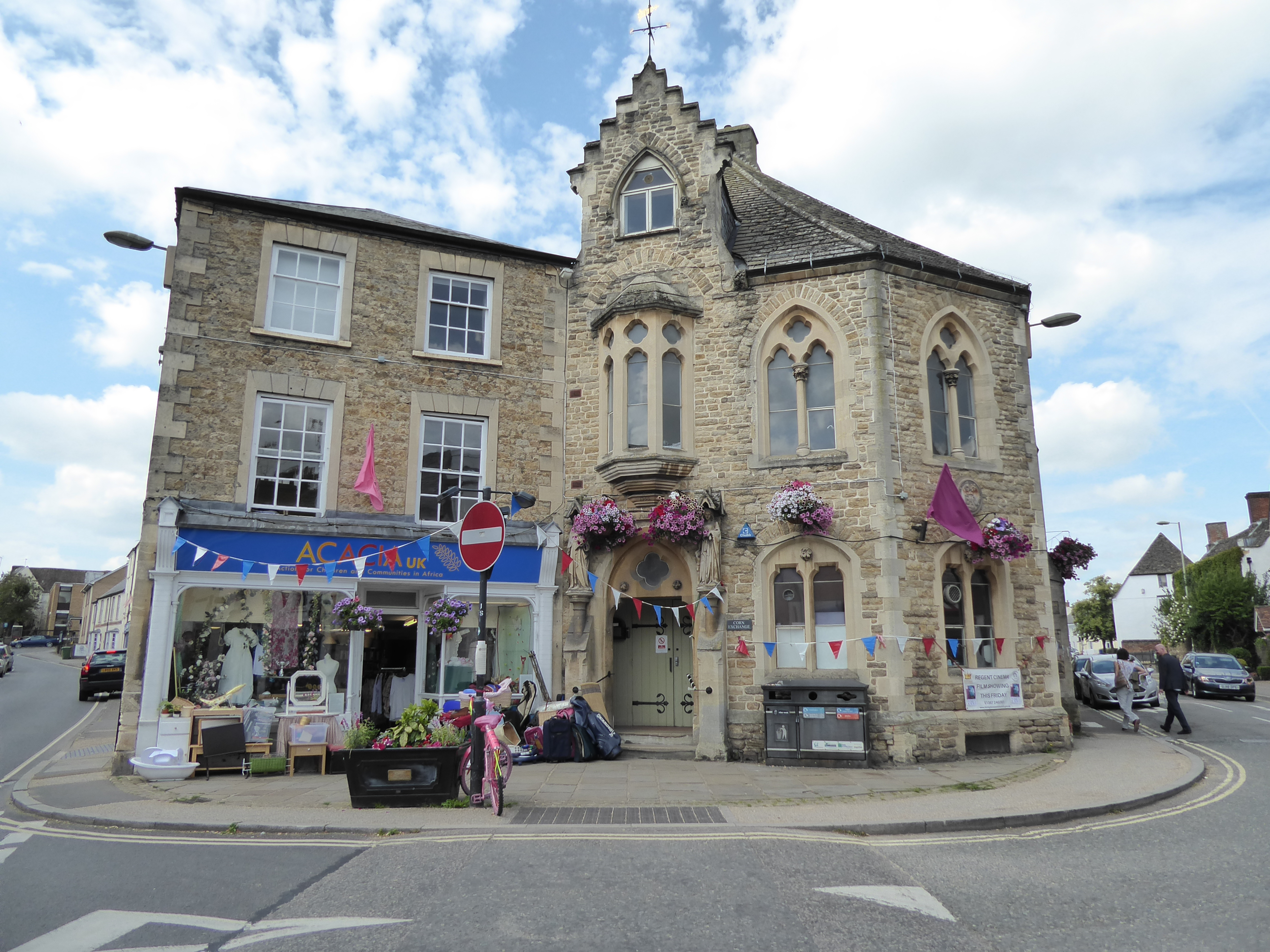
- Corn Exchange, Faringdon

- Shown in Oxfordshire
- 51.6580°N 1.5851°W
- Location: Gloucester Street, Faringdon

History
- Built: 1863

Site notes
- Architect: John Luker
- Architectural style: Gothic Revival style

Listed Building – Grade II
- Official name: Corn Exchange and Former Savings Bank
- Designated: 10 July 1986
- Reference no.: 1368496

The Corn Exchange is a commercial building in Gloucester Street in Faringdon, Oxfordshire, England. The structure, which is currently used as a community events venue, is a Grade II listed building.

== History ==
In 1862, a group of local businessmen decided to form a private company, to be known as the "Faringdon Corn Exchange Company Limited", to finance and commission a corn exchange for the town. The site they selected in Gloucester Street was occupied by the Green Dragon public house.

The new building was designed by John Luker of West Dulwich in the Gothic Revival style, built by local contractors, Isaac and James Wheeler, in rubble masonry at a cost of £1,400 and was officially opened by the Member of Parliament, John Walter, on 29 December 1863. The design of the corn exchange involved an asymmetrical main frontage of two bays on the corner of Gloucester Street and Marlborough Street. The left hand bay featured an arched doorway, with a quatrefoil in the tympanum and a moulded surround, flanked by statues on pedestals. There was an oriel window with cusped heads on the first floor and an arched window in the stepped gable above. The right-hand bay, the canted bay to the right of that and the first bay in Gloucester Street were all fenestrated with bi-partite windows with ogee-shaped heads on the ground floor and by bi-partite windows with dividing shafts, cusped heads and quatrefoils on the first floor. The Gloucester Road frontage extended along the street with a further five bays all containing tri-partite segmentally-shaped windows with dividing shafts and ornate bosses. Internally, the principal room was the main hall which featured a vaulted ceiling.

The building was also used for public events: speakers included the former Virginia slave and anti-slavery campaigner, Henry Box Brown, who visited the building in September 1867. A single storey building behind the corn exchange, which had been commissioned the Faringdon Trustee Savings Bank, was acquired by the Faringdon Corn Exchange Company in 1889, and subsequently leased to the local freemasons as a meeting place for the Vale of White Horse Lodge.

The use of the main building as a corn exchange declined significantly in the wake of the Great Depression of British Agriculture in the late 19th century. Instead, from 1913, it was let out as a cinema showing silent films. After the building had been sold to Faringdon Parish Council, the Faringdon Corn Exchange Company was wound up in late 1936. The building was subsequently used as a community events venue for dances, dinners and similar events.

== See also ==
- Corn exchanges in England
