= Aylesbury Clock Tower =

Clock tower in Aylesbury, Buckinghamshire, England

Coordinates: 51°48′58″N 0°48′45″W

The Aylesbury Clock Tower is located at the centre of Aylesbury, in Buckinghamshire, United Kingdom's Market Square was built in 1876. It dominates the square and stands on the site of a former market house which was demolished in 1866. The clock tower does not actually ring or have a bell inside of it unlike St Mary's Church. It is a staple of Aylesbury culture.

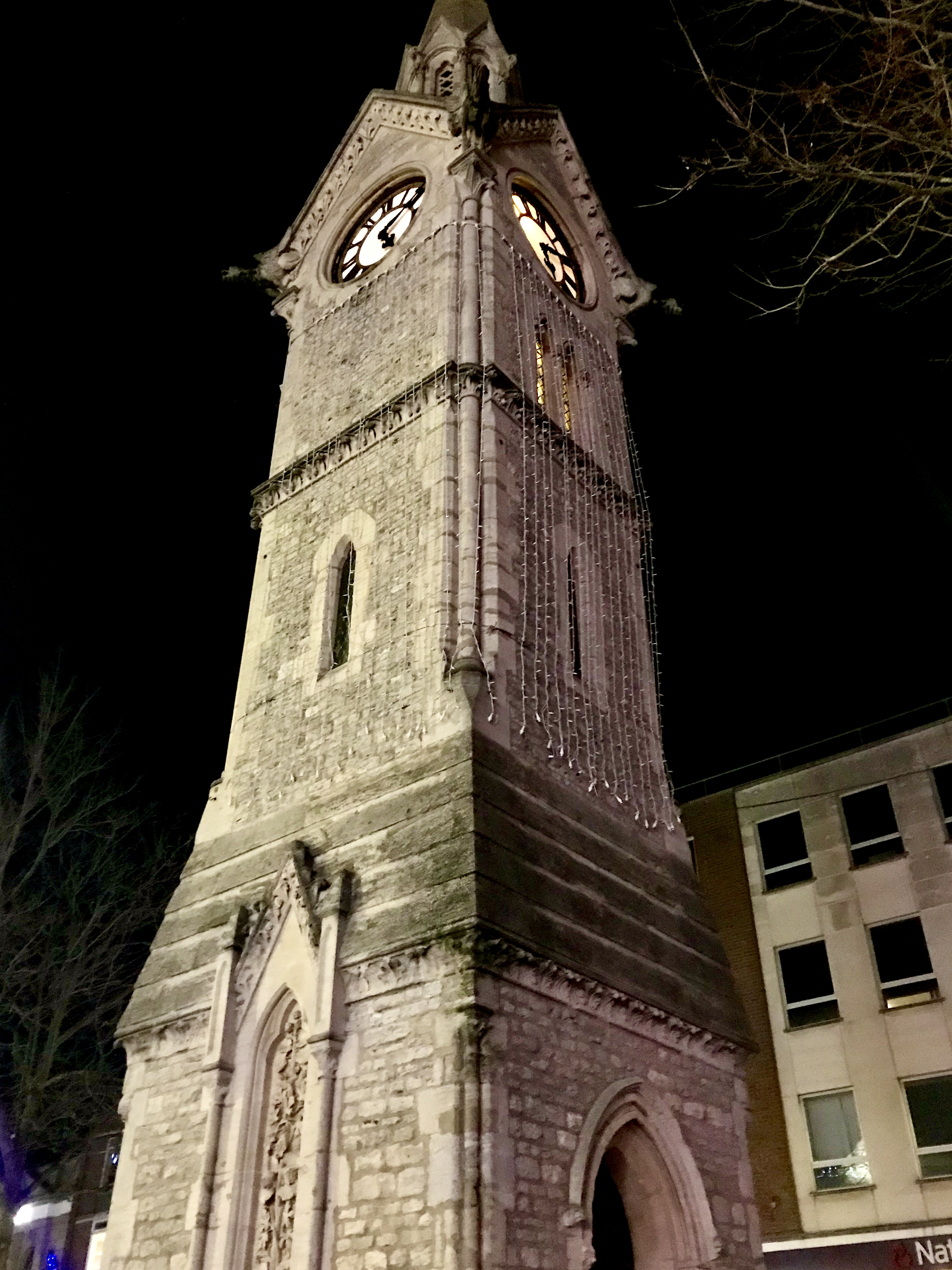
Aylesbury Clock Tower

The tower was designed by architect D Brandon who also designed other public buildings in the town including the Corn Exchange. Throughout the tower, there are floral scrolls made of stone going up and down the side. This was made and carved by Frank William Bennett who was married to Lucy Stevens. The group who built this was the Webster and Cannon team that Frank was a part of.

On 3 November 2025 it was listed as a grade II listed building.
