= Alexandra Theatre =

Alexandra Theatre may refer to:

- Alexandra Theatre, Birmingham, a theatre in Birmingham, England, now the New Alexandra Theatre
- Alexandra Theatre, Bognor Regis, a theatre in the British town of Bognor Regis
- Alexandra Theatre, London, a theatre in the Stoke Newington district of London
- Alexandra Theatre, Melbourne, a former name for Her Majesty's Theatre
- Alexandra Theatre, Newton Abbot, a theatre in Newton Abbot
- Alexandra Theatre, Liverpool, a former name of the Liverpool Empire Theatre

== See also ==
- Alexandria Theater (San Francisco)
