= Westgate Hall, Grantham =

Commercial building in Grantham, Lincolnshire, England

Westgate Hall
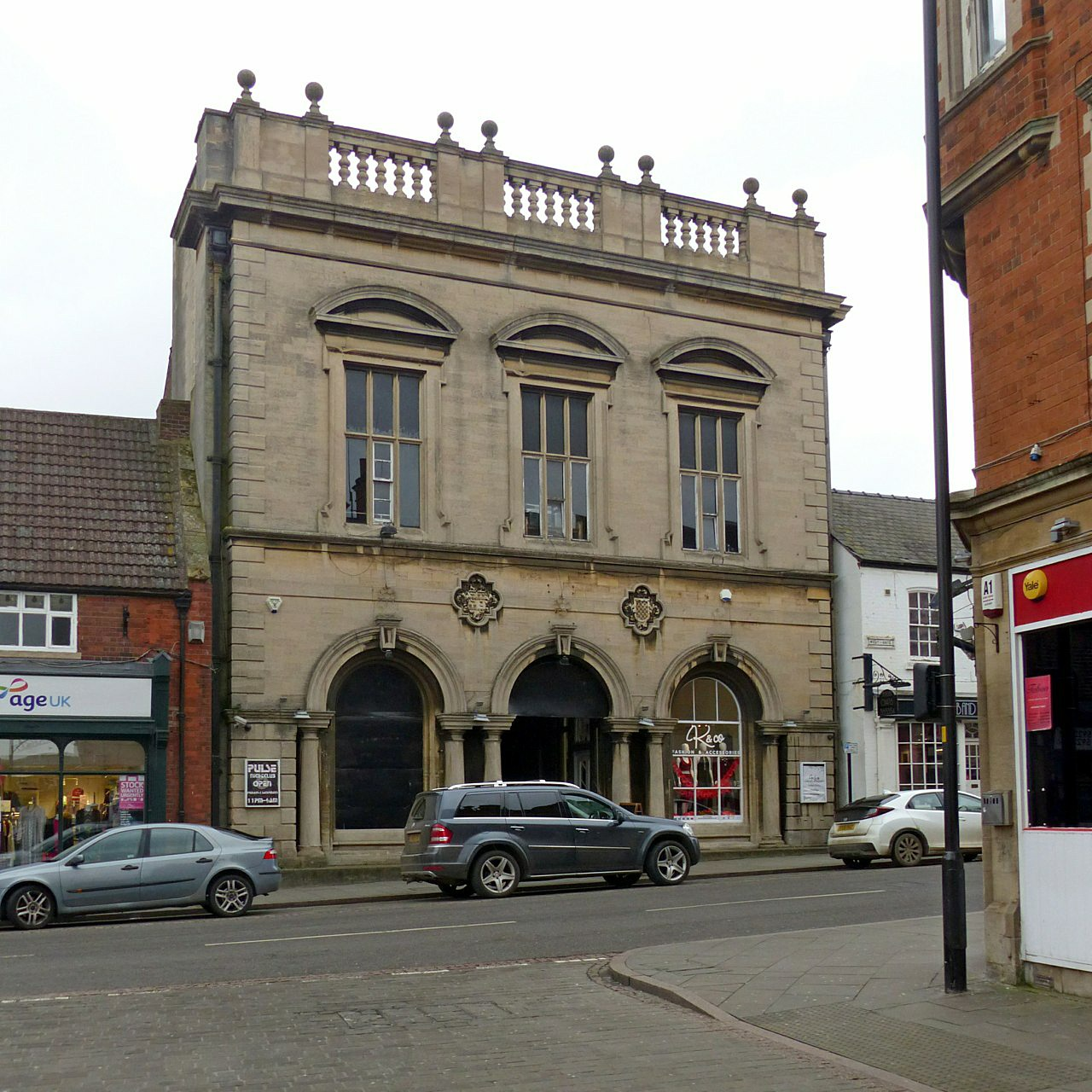
- Westgate Hall

- Shown in Lincolnshire
- 52.9126°N 0.6436°W
- Location: Westgate, Grantham

History
- Built: 1852

Site notes
- Architect: Anthony Salvin
- Architectural style: Neoclassical style

Listed Building – Grade II
- Official name: Westgate Hall
- Designated: 20 April 1972
- Reference no.: 1062439

Westgate Hall is a commercial building in Westgate, Grantham, Lincolnshire, England. The structure, which was last used as a nightclub, is a Grade II listed building.

== History ==
In the mid-19th century, a group of local businessmen decided to form a private company, known as the "Grantham Corn Exchange Company", to finance and commission a purpose-built corn exchange for the town. The site they selected was on the east side of Westgate. The building was designed by Anthony Salvin in the neoclassical style, built in ashlar stone and was completed in 1852.

The design involved a symmetrical main frontage of three bays facing onto Westgate. On the ground floor, there was an arcade of three round-headed openings flanked by short Tuscan order columns supporting architraves and keystones. On the first floor there were three mullioned and transomed windows with architraves and segmental pediments. There were quoins at the corners and an entablature, a cornice and a balustraded parapet with finials at roof level.

The buildings was also used as a public events venue: the suffragettes, Gertrude Wilkinson and Florence Balgarnie, addressed a meeting about votes for women in the building in May 1885. The use of the building as a corn exchange declined significantly in the wake of the Great Depression of British Agriculture in the late 19th century. Instead it was converted for use as a butter and poultry market in November 1892. It was used as a NAAFI Club during the Second World War and, after the war, it became a dance hall. It then served as an auction house in the 1980s and became a nightclub in 1993. It was variously branded as Jaspers, Club It and Wow ("Wasted or What") but, after it fell vacant in 2017, the fabric of the building started to deteriorate.

A major programme of restoration works, carried out to a design by Evan McDowell Architects at a cost of £600,000 and financed with grant from the Grantham High Street Heritage Action Zone programme, started on site in late 2022.

== See also ==
- Corn exchanges in England
