= Corn Exchange, Dereham =

Commercial building in Dereham, Norfolk, England

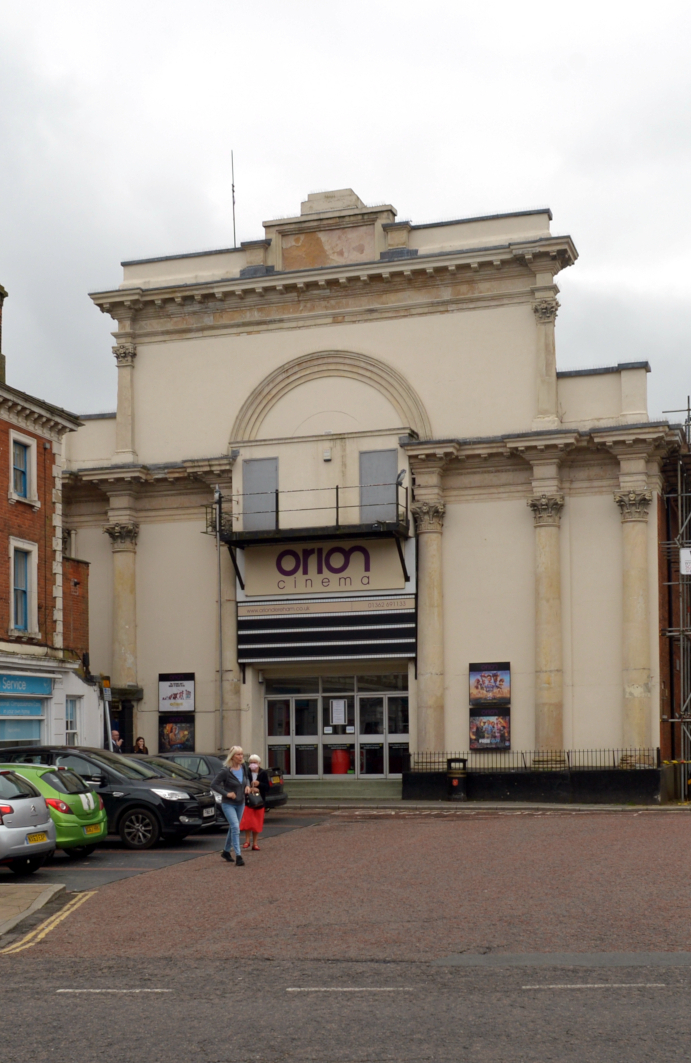
- Corn Exchange, Dereham

- Shown in Norfolk
- 52.6812°N 0.9404°E
- Location: Market Place, Dereham

History
- Built: 1857

Site notes
- Architect: Mathias Goggs
- Architectural style: Neoclassical style

Listed Building – Grade II
- Official name: Former Corn Exchange
- Designated: 20 August 1951
- Reference no.: 1169492

The Corn Exchange is a commercial building in the Market Place, Dereham, Norfolk, England. The structure, which is used as a cinema, is a Grade II listed building.

== History ==
In the early 1850s, a group of local businessmen decided to form a private company, known as the "East Dereham Corn Exchange Company", to finance and commission a purpose-built corn exchange for the town. The investors included Thomas Coke, 2nd Earl of Leicester, whose seat was a Holkham Hall, and who took a personal interest in the project. The site selected, on the west side of the Market Place, had been occupied by The Shambles, a collection of dilapidated market stalls.

The building was designed by Mathias Goggs of Swaffham in the neoclassical style, built in red brick with a stucco finish and was opened in February 1857. The design involved a symmetrical main frontage of five bays facing onto the Market Place. The bays were separated by six full-height Corinthian order columns supporting a cornice and a parapet. The central section of three bays, which featured an elevated parapet, formed a triumphal arch. A statue of Thomas Coke, 1st Earl of Leicester was installed on top of the raised parapet on 6 September 1858.

After a public meeting in the building, in June 1859, at which 30 men enlisted for the newly formed Dereham Volunteer Rifle Corps, the building also served as the local drill hall. It appears that the building did not meet with universal acclaim as, in February 1866, an application was made to the court to have it demolished. The Vice-Chancellor ruled that it should not be pulled down as it was "a great public improvement". However, the use of the building as a corn exchange declined significantly in the wake of the Great Depression of British Agriculture in the late 19th century. The glass roof on the building was badly damaged in a zeppelin raid in September 1915.

The building was converted for use as a cinema in 1924 and re-branded as the Exchange Theatre after the Second World War. The statue of the Earl of Leicester on the top of the parapet was hit by a bolt of lightning in June 1950; the head was shattered and the rest of the statue was subsequently demolished. The building was remodelled to create a dance floor in the stalls area in 1961. After a change of ownership in 1975, it started operating as a bingo hall and social club, as well as a cinema. The building was later remodelled again to create a three-screen cinema and re-branded as the Orion Cinema.

== See also ==
- Corn exchanges in England
