= Corn Exchange, Hadleigh =

Commercial building in Hadleigh, Suffolk, England

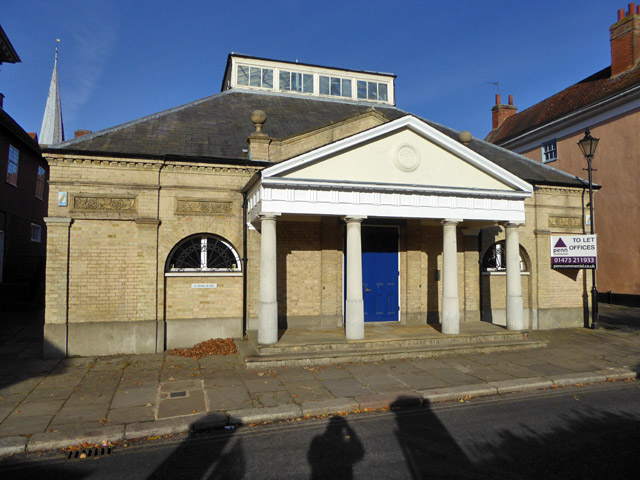
- Corn Exchange, Hadleigh

- Shown in Suffolk
- 52.0430°N 0.9531°E
- Location: Market Place, Hadleigh

History
- Built: 1813

Site notes
- Architectural style: Neoclassical style

Listed Building – Grade II
- Official name: Corn Exchange
- Designated: 22 May 1972
- Reference no.: 1351724

The Corn Exchange is a commercial building in the Market Place in Hadleigh, Suffolk, England. The structure, which currently accommodates a small business centre, is a Grade II listed building.

== History ==
The town has a long history of weekly markets dating back to the grant of a market charter by King Henry III on 30 May 1252. In the early 19th century, the market feoffees launched an initiative to commission a purpose-built corn exchange which would be financed by public subscription and would protect market traders from inclement weather. The site the feoffees selected was already in their ownership and, being just to the south of St Mary's Church, was known as the Church Croft. It was designed in the neoclassical style, built in brown brick and was officially opened on 22 November 1813.

The design involved a symmetrical main frontage of seven bays facing onto the Market Place. The central section of three bays featured a tetrastyle portico formed by four Doric order columns supporting an entablature, which was decorated with triglyphs and surmounted by a pediment, containing a roundel in the tympanum. The bays flanking the portico were fenestrated by Diocletian windows surmounted by panels containing carvings of flowers and leaves, while the outer bays were blind but the brickwork was also surmounted by similarly decorated panels. At roof level, there was a modillioned cornice. There was originally an open rectangular courtyard but this was subsequently covered by a hipped roof and a rectangular glass dome.

The use of the building as a corn exchange declined significantly in the wake of the Great Depression of British Agriculture in the late 19th century. An extensive programme of restoration works was completed in 1895.

The building continued to be owned by the Hadleigh Market Feoffment Charity until being sold in the 1970s. It was subsequently acquired by Suffolk County Council and operated as the Brett River Children's Centre until 2014. In the absence of alternative uses, the county council marketed the building for sale in April 2015.

The building was subsequently converted into a small business centre with the whole of the ground floor being let to Robert Chapman from Boxford and Ben Stickels from Kersey, for use as the offices of a newly formed firm of estate agents, Chapman Stickels, in October 2019. The firm commissioned a significant programme of refurbishment works to the ground floor which involved removing 1980s furnishings, replacing doors and re-painting. Other tenants moved into smaller units on the mezzanine floor.

== See also ==
- Corn exchanges in England
