= Corn Exchange, Royston =

Commercial building in Royston, Hertfordshire, England

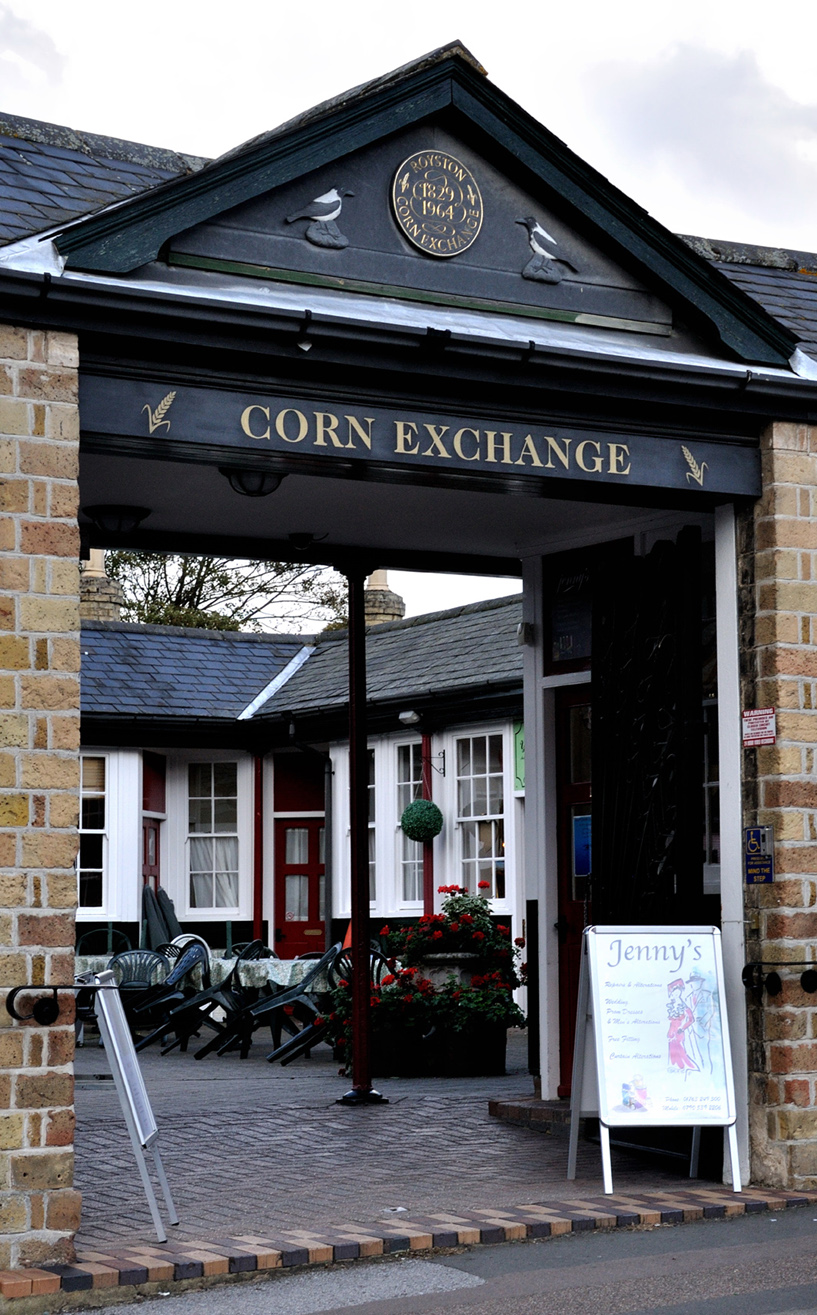
- Corn Exchange, Royston

- Shown in Hertfordshire
- 52.0464°N 0.0217°W
- Location: Market Hill, Royston

History
- Built: 1829

Site notes
- Architectural style: Vernacular style

Listed Building – Grade II
- Official name: The Corn Exchange
- Designated: 11 June 1976
- Reference no.: 1295632

The Corn Exchange is a commercial building on Market Hill in Royston, Hertfordshire, England. The structure, which is now used as a series of retail units organised round a central courtyard, is a Grade II listed building.

== History ==
Until the early 19th century, market traders carried out their business in the open on Market Hill. When the weather was inclement, the traders invariably met in the yard of the Green Man Inn where there was "a large garden and stables and ten corn shops". After the manor of Royston was bequeathed to him in the late 18th century, the new lord of the manor, Thomas Brand, 20th Baron Dacre, whose seat was at Kimpton Hoo, decided that this arrangement was unsatisfactory and decided to commission a purpose-built corn exchange for the town.

The new building was designed in the vernacular style, built in moulded yellow bricks using a process patented by a Ware-based brick merchant, Caleb Hitch, and was completed in 1829. The design involved a long symmetrical main frontage facing onto Market Hill. At the centre of the main frontage, which was entirely un-fenestrated, was an opening with a wooden entablature surmounted by a triangular pediment. The opening provided access to a series of single storey buildings organised in a square around a central courtyard. The buildings were fenestrated by sash windows and featured wide eaves, supported by cast iron columns, and Welsh slate roofs.

These single story buildings formed the only part of the market area which was permanently covered over. A large corn market was held in the corn exchange every Wednesday. However, the use of the building as a corn exchange declined significantly in the wake of the Great Depression of British Agriculture in the late 19th century.

The building was also used as a venue for public events: the socialite, Margot Asquith, reported that in 1915, the Leader of the House of Lords, Robert Crewe-Milnes, 1st Marquess of Crewe, gave a speech on land reform in the corn exchange. The complex was subsequently re-organised as a series of 23 small retail units with a gazebo-type structure in the centre of the courtyard.

== See also ==
- Corn exchanges in England
