= The Talbot, Stow-on-the-Wold =

Public house in Stow-on-the Wold, Gloucestershire, England

The Talbot, Stow-on-the Wold
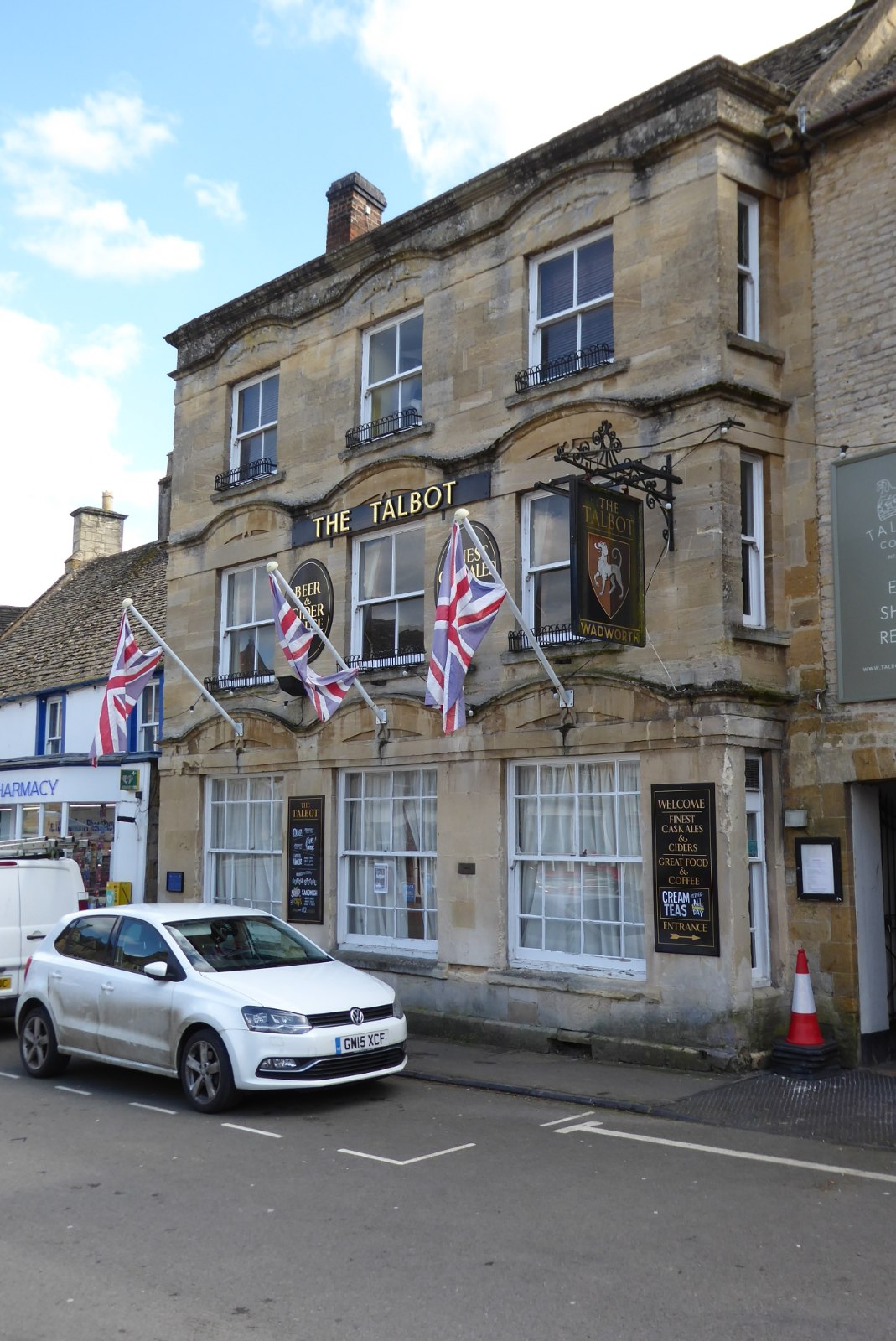
- The Talbot, Stow-on-the Wold

- Shown in Gloucestershire
- 51.9298°N 1.7226°W
- Location: Market Square, Stow-on-the-Wold

History
- Built: 1714

Site notes
- Architectural style: Vernacular style

Listed Building – Grade II
- Official name: The Talbot Hotel (and rear extensions)
- Designated: 3 March 1982
- Reference no.: 1088797

The Talbot, formerly known as The Talbot Hotel, is a public house in the Market Square in Stow-on-the-Wold, Gloucestershire, England. The structure, which was originally a coaching inn and later served as the local corn exchange as well as the main hotel in the town, is a Grade II listed building.

== History ==
The Talbot was originally conceived as a coaching inn with stables in the street behind. It was designed in the vernacular style, built in rubble masonry in around 1714. In the 1840s, the building began to serve as the local corn exchange and, at that time, the left-hand section of three bays was refaced in ashlar stone such that it slightly projected forward onto the Market Square. The new façade was fenestrated with sash windows on all three floors with hood moulds above each window and a parapet at roof level. Meanwhile, the right-hand section of two bays remained faced in rubble masonry with more basic finishes.

A brass letter box was installed between the windows on the ground floor to enable corn merchants to post their weekly corn returns: these returns informed the weekly summary of local corn trades published in national newspapers. In the second half of the 18th century, the hotel proprietor was Richard Day and it was branded "Day's Talbot Hotel".

The use of the building as a corn exchange declined significantly in the wake of the Great Depression of British Agriculture in the late 19th century. However, the building continued to provide lodging for customers and to serve as a regular meeting place for local farmers, and for the local masonic lodge. An extensive programme of repairs was carried out, following a serious fire in the building in February 1870.

The hotel was acquired by Hitchman's Brewery of Chipping Norton in the late 19th century, before passing to Hunt Edmunds Brewery of Banbury in 1925. It came into the ownership of Bass Charrington in the 1960s, by which time it was the largest hotel in the town. It was subsequently acquired by Wadworths of Devizes in 1985.

== See also ==
- Corn exchanges in England
