= Corn Exchange, Barton-upon-Humber =

Commercial building in Barton-upon-Humber, Lincolnshire, England

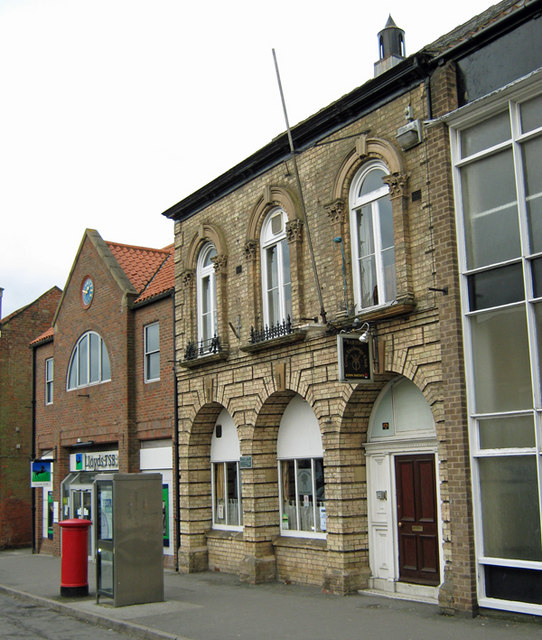
- Corn Exchange, Barton-upon-Humber

- Shown in Lincolnshire
- 53.6830°N 0.4389°W
- Location: Market Place, Barton-upon-Humber

History
- Built: 1854

Site notes
- Architect: D. W. Aston
- Architectural style: Italianate style

Listed Building – Grade II
- Official name: The Constitutional Club
- Designated: 17 September 1976
- Reference no.: 1187168

The Corn Exchange is a commercial building in the Market Place in Barton-upon-Humber, Lincolnshire, England. The structure, which is now used as a private members club, is a Grade II listed building.

== History ==
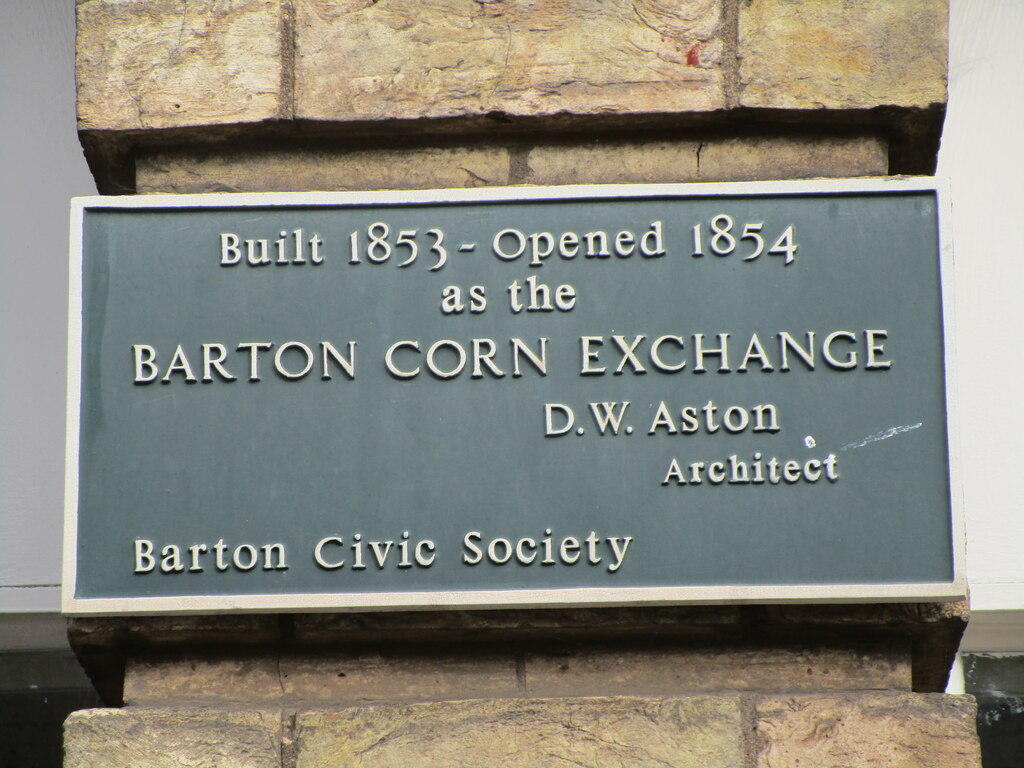
Plaque on the front wall

In the mid-19th century, a group of local businessmen decided to form a trust, managed by a board of 15 trustees led by a local builder, William Graburn, to finance and commission a purpose-built corn exchange for the town. The site they selected was on the north side of the Market Place.

The building was designed by D. W. Aston of Kingston upon Hull, built by Willford & Dinsdale in yellow gault bricks at a cost of £1,000 and was officially opened in February 1854. The design involved a symmetrical main frontage of three bays facing onto the Market Place. The ground floor, which was rusticated, featured three round headed openings with voussoirs and keystones, while the first floor was fenestrated by round headed casement windows flanked by short Corinthian order pilasters supporting architraves and keystones. There were quoins at the corners and, at roof level, there was a cornice, supported by paired brackets, and a Welsh slate roof. Internally, the principal rooms were the market hall on the ground floor and a reading room on the first floor.

The trustees got into financial difficulties at an early stage and, by 1861, the building was being marketed for sale. It was acquired by the lord of the manor, Major George Charles Uppleby, whose seat was at Barrow Hall. Uppleby allowed the building to be used for drill practice by the 12th Lincolnshire Rifle Volunteers in which he served as an officer.

The use of the building as a corn exchange declined significantly in the wake of the Great Depression of British Agriculture in the late 19th century. Instead, it was converted for use as a private members club known as the Barton Constitutional Club in 1888. It evolved to become the Barton Conservative Club and later the Barton Corn Exchange Club. As such, it was equipped with snooker tables and became a venue for local snooker matches. It also became the base for the Barton Community Band, which rehearses there twice a week, and for the Barton-upon-Humber Lions Club.

== See also ==
- Corn exchanges in England
