= Corn Hall, Cirencester =

Commercial building in Cirencester, Gloucestershire, England

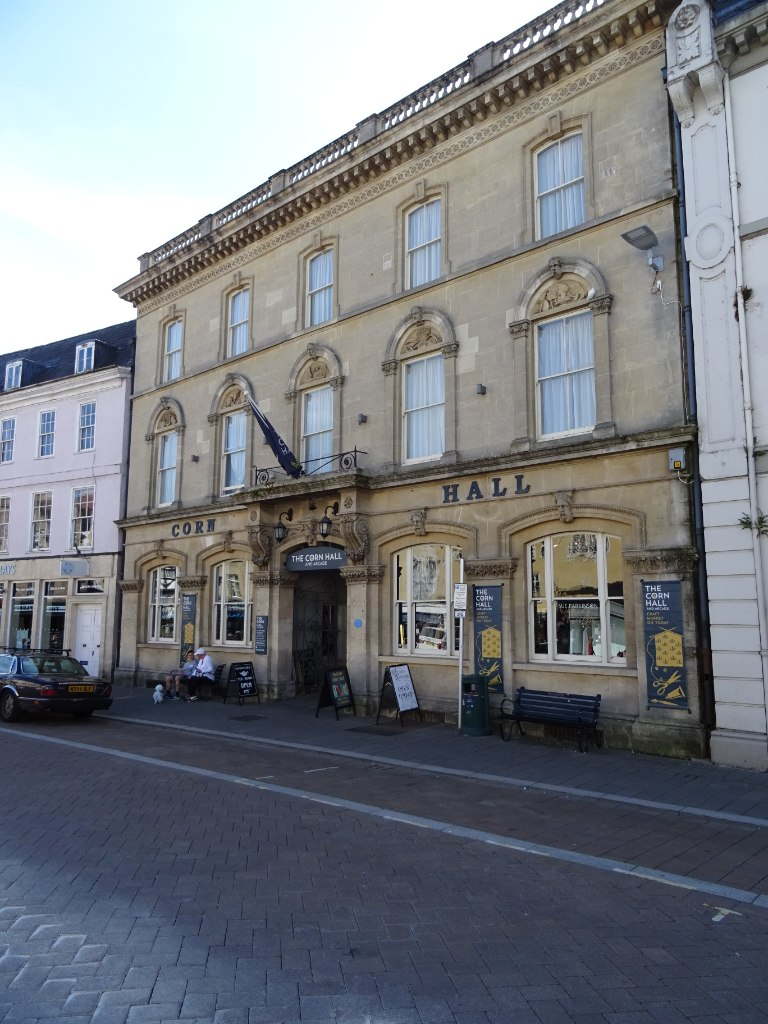
- Corn Hall, Cirencester

- Shown in Gloucestershire
- 51.7169°N 1.9670°W
- Location: Market Place, Cirencester

History
- Built: 1863

Site notes
- Architect(s): James Medland and Alfred Maberly
- Architectural style: Italianate style

Listed Building – Grade II
- Official name: Corn Hall Buildings
- Designated: 23 July 1971
- Reference no.: 1187501

The Corn Hall is a commercial building in the Market Place, Cirencester, Gloucestershire, England. The structure, which is used as a shopping arcade and community events venue, is a Grade II listed building.

== History ==
In the mid-19th century, a group of local businessmen decided to form a private company, known as the "Corn Hall Company", to finance and commission a corn exchange for the town. The site they selected, on the south side of the Market Place, was occupied by the Boothall, where wool trading had been conducted since the 16th century. The directors secured a 500-year lease over the site from the owner, Henry Bathurst, 4th Earl Bathurst, whose seat was at Cirencester Park.

The building was designed by James Medland and Alfred Maberly in the Italianate style, built in ashlar stone and was completed in 1863. The design involved a symmetrical main frontage of five bays facing onto the Market Place. The central bay featured a segmentally-headed opening with a hood mould and a keystone flanked by short Corinthian order pilasters and brackets supporting a cornice and a wrought iron balcony. The other bays on the ground floor were fenestrated by segmentally-headed tri-partite windows with hood moulds and keystones, while the first floor was fenestrated by round-headed sash windows flanked by pilasters supporting architraves and keystones, and the second floor was fenestrated by segmentally-headed sash windows with architraves and keystones. The heads of the first floor windows contained stone carvings by the sculptor, James Forsyth, depicting musical instruments, a ship's anchor, a wheatsheaf, fine arts and a phoenix. At roof level, there was a frieze, a modillioned cornice and a balustraded parapet. Internally, the principal room was the main hall, which was accessed down an angled corridor to the left from the rear of the entrance hall.

The use of the building as a corn exchange declined significantly in the wake of the Great Depression of British Agriculture in the late 19th century. It was subsequently used as a community events venue and hosted lectures by the local school of art as well as performances by visiting amateur and professional theatrical companies. It was used as a reception centre for evacuees, before hosted a boxing match to raise money for Wings for Victory Week in May 1943, during the Second World War.

The building was acquired by Cirencester Urban District Council in 1951 and the main hall then became the local civil defence headquarters for the town, while the second floor was used as a club for the local branch of the Royal Air Forces Association. It went on to become a popular concert venue: the locally-born drummer, Cozy Powell, performed there with rock band, The Corals, on a weekly basis in the mid-1960s.

In 1975, the building hosted the first of a series of regular craftsman's markets selling handmade goods to tourists. It was acquired by a developer, Wildmoor Properties, in 2006. An extensive programme of refurbishment works, undertaken by at a cost of £2 million, was completed in November 2008. The musicians, Brian May and Tony Iommi, visited the Corn Hall to unveil a plaque in Powell's honour in January 2016.

== See also ==
- Corn exchanges in England
