= Corn Hall, Swaffham =

Commercial building in Norfolk, England

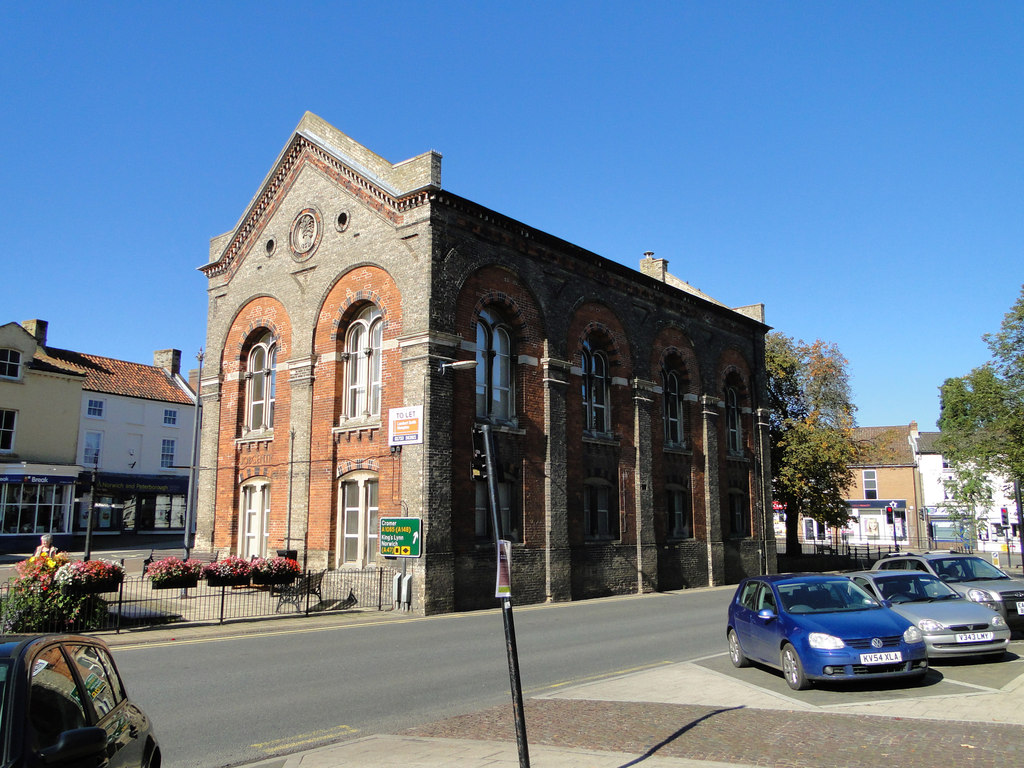
- Corn Hall, Swaffham

- Shown in Norfolk
- 52.6483°N 0.6884°E
- Location: Market Place, Swaffham

History
- Built: 1858

Site notes
- Architect: Mathias Goggs
- Architectural style: Italianate style

Listed Building – Grade II
- Official name: Former Corn Hall
- Designated: 17 January 1973
- Reference no.: 1187501

The Corn Hall is a commercial building in the Market Place, Swaffham, Norfolk, England. The structure, which is used as offices and as a coffee house, is a Grade II listed building.

== History ==
In the first half of the 19th century, local corn merchants conducted their trade around the market cross, which was surmounted by a statue of the goddess, Ceres, and presented to the town by George Walpole, 3rd Earl of Orford in 1783. In the mid-19th century, a group of local businessmen decided to form a private company, known as the "Swaffham Corn Exchange and Public Rooms Company", to finance and commission a purpose-built corn exchange for the town.

The building was designed by a local builder and architect, Mathias Goggs, in the Italianate style, built in red brick with gault brick dressings at a cost of £1,800 and was completed in 1858. The design involved symmetrical frontages of two bays at the north and south ends. In each bay there were tall recesses containing two-light mullioned casement windows with segmental heads on the ground floor and two light casement windows with round heads on the first floor. The recesses were flanked by pilasters supporting the gable ends, which contained circular panels with carvings of wheatsheaves and were surmounted by modillioned cornices and parapets. The side elevations of four bays each were fenestrated in a similar style. The architectural historian, Nikolaus Pevsner, was critical of the design which he described as "a depressing round arched structure of red and gault brick like a Methodist church."

The use of the building as a corn exchange declined significantly in the wake of the Great Depression of British Agriculture in the late 19th century. Instead, it was let out for commercial use and accommodated, amongst others, a citadel hosted by the Salvation Army. The building was also used for public meetings: in September 1871, it hosted a visit and speech by the future president of the National Agricultural Labourers' Union, Joseph Arch.

During the First World War, the building provided accommodation for soldiers about to be deployed to the Western Front; soldiers from the Essex Regiment were billeted there in October 1914 and soldiers from the Sherwood Rangers Yeomanry and South Nottinghamshire Hussars stayed there in June 1915. It was used as a canteen operated by the YMCA during the Second World War. After the war the building was used as offices. An extensive programme of refurbishment works was completed in 2010 to allow part of the building to be used as a Costa Coffee outlet.

== See also ==
- Corn exchanges in England
