= Corn Exchange, Melton Mowbray =

Commercial building in Melton Mowbray, Leicestershire, England

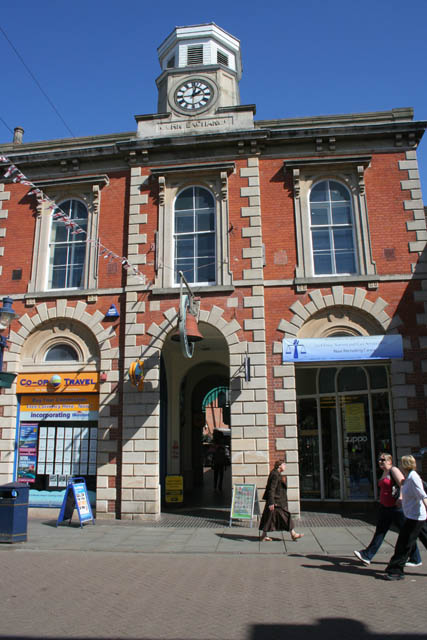
- Corn Exchange, Melton Mowbray

- Shown in Leicestershire
- 52.7654°N 0.8875°W
- Location: Nottingham Street, Melton Mowbray

History
- Built: 1855

Site notes
- Architect(s): T. Mallinson and Son
- Architectural style: Italianate style

Listed Building – Grade II
- Official name: The Former Corn Exchange
- Designated: 12 October 1976
- Reference no.: 1264925

The Corn Exchange is a commercial building in Nottingham Street in Melton Mowbray, Leicestershire, England. The structure, which is now used to provide access to a shopping centre, is a Grade II listed building.

== History ==
In the mid-19th century, a group of local businessmen decided to form a private company, known as the "Melton Mowbray Corn Exchange and Public Rooms Company", to finance and commission a purpose-built corn exchange for the town. The site they selected was on the east side of Nottingham Street.

The foundation stone for the new building was laid on 11 November 1854. It was designed by T. Mallinson and Son of Nottingham in the Italianate style, built by John Norman and Son of Leicester in red brick with ashlar stone dressings and was completed in January 1855. The design involved a symmetrical main frontage of three bays facing onto Nottingham Street. The ground floor featured three round headed openings with rusticated surrounds and voussoirs while the first floor was fenestrated by three round headed sash windows with window sills, architraves and cornices supported by brackets. There were quoins at the corners and, at roof level, there was a frieze, carved with the year "A. D. 1854", a cornice, which was supported by paired brackets, and, in the central bay, a small parapet carved with the words "Corn Exchange" surmounted by an octagon-shaped turret. Internally, the principal room was the main hall which was 80 feet (24 m) long and 40 feet (12 m) wide.

The use of the building as a corn exchange declined significantly in the wake of the Great Depression of British Agriculture in the late 19th century. The building instead served as the venue for petty session hearings and as the local office of the Midland District of the YMCA. The 3rd Company of the 1st Administrative Battalion, Leicestershire Rifle Volunteer Corps, which had been raised in the town in 1860, evolved to become "C Company" of the 1st Volunteer Battalion, the Leicestershire Regiment in 1883 and trained at the corn exchange.

The building was also used for public events: in 1911, the campaigners for women's suffrage, Millicent Fawcett and Daisy Renton, gave a talk in the building. Other visitors included the Prince of Wales who attended the Royal British Legion Ball in the building, in March 1925. The Prince of Wales returned, with the Duke of York and Prince Henry to attend a dinner there, organised by the local branch of the National Farmers' Union, in February 1926. At the start of the Second World War, the building was used as a processing centre for evacuees transferred from London. After the officers and men of the 4th Parachute Brigade, elements of which were based nearby at Staveley Lodge, took part in Operation Market Garden, they were entertained in the building in October 1944.

In the 1960s, the building became a popular concert venue: performers included Chris Farlowe, who performed with the band, The Thunderbirds, in 1967, and Romeo Challenger, who performed with the band, Hal C. Blake, in 1969. By the 1980s, the main hall had been demolished and the surviving part of the building, at the front, had become the entrance to a small shopping arcade known as The Bell Centre, named to commemorate The Bell Hotel, of which only the façade remains, to the south of the corn exchange.

== See also ==
- Corn exchanges in England
