= Tunsgate =

Commercial building in Guildford, Surrey, England

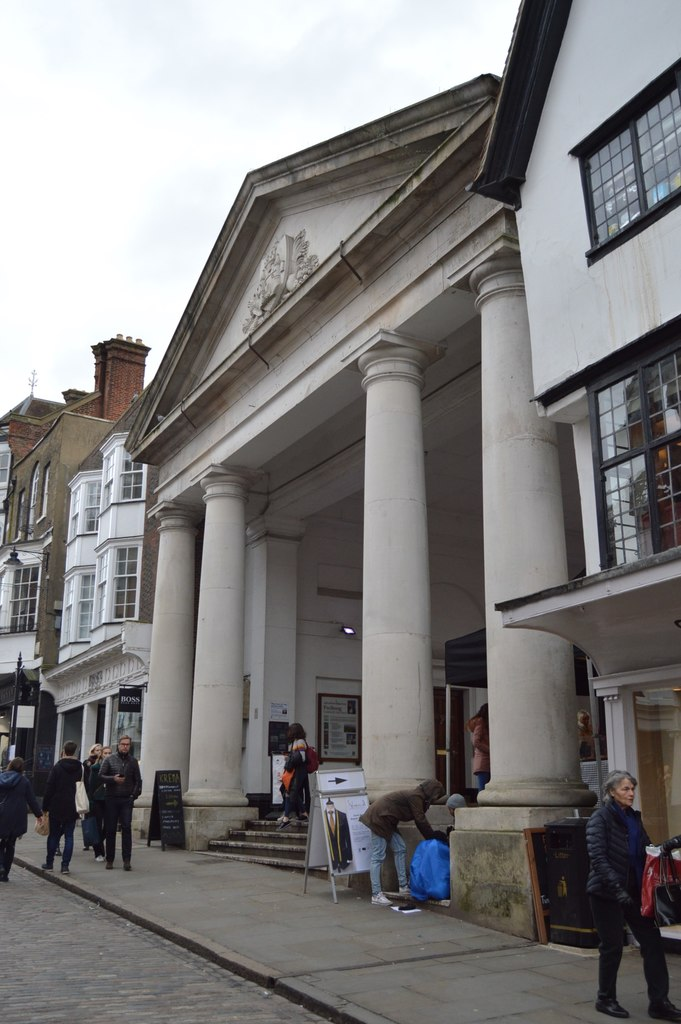
- Tunsgate

- Shown in Surrey
- 51.2357°N 0.5721°W
- Location: High Street, Guildford

History
- Built: 1818

Site notes
- Architect: Henry Garling
- Architectural style: Neoclassical style

Listed Building – Grade II
- Official name: Tunsgate
- Designated: 1 May 1853
- Reference no.: 1377878

Tunsgate is a neoclassical style building in Guildford, Surrey, England. The structure, which was originally a corn exchange and now forms the entrance to a shopping centre, is a Grade II listed building.

== History ==
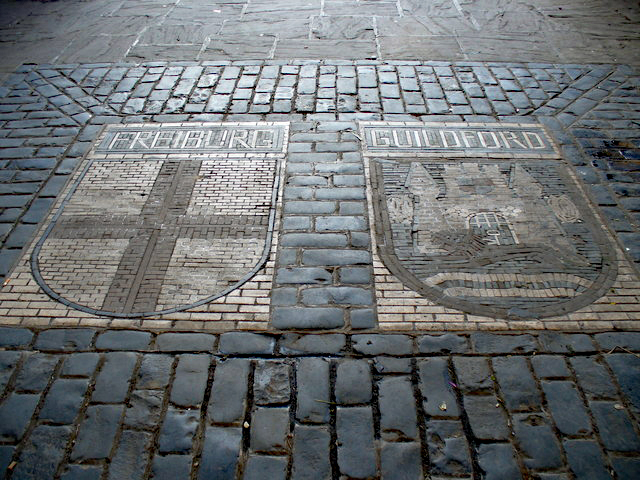
Guildford and Freiburg im Breisgau coats of arms mosaic installed on the floor of the building

During the second half of the 16th century and into the 17th century, corn merchants conducted their trade on the ground floor off the Guildhall. This arrangement ceased in 1626, when trading moved to a space covered by a wooden canopy on the south side of the High Street, in front of the Three Tuns Inn.

In the early 19th century, civic leaders decided to demolish the Three Tuns Inn and to commission a more substantial structure, which would accommodate the corn market and the court of assizes, on the same site. The new building was designed by Henry Garling in the neoclassical style, built in Portland stone and was completed in 1818. The design featured a large portico with four Tuscan order columns supporting an entablature and a pediment, with the borough coat of arms and some agricultural symbols in the tympanum.

By 1860, the court facilities in the building were found to be "grossly inadequate" and the assizes moved to the County Hall in North Street, which had been commissioned as a mechanics' institute in 1845. The use of the Tunsgate building as a corn exchange declined significantly in the wake of the Great Depression of British Agriculture in the late 19th century. After trading moved to Woodbridge Road, the Tunsgate corn market closed on 18 May 1901.

Most of the building was demolished in 1937 leaving the portico to form the entrance to a new car park. The four columns, which had originally been evenly spaced, were adjusted with the two centre columns being moved further apart, to enable traffic to pass through. The architectural historian, Nikolaus Pevsner, was impressed by the retention of the portico describing it as "a successful case of sympathetic re-use instead of demolition".

The 1930s car park was redeveloped as a shopping centre, known as "Tunsgate Square", in the 1970s and a mosaic depicting the coats of arms of Guildford and its twin town, Freiburg im Breisgau, was installed under the portico in 1992. The shopping centre was re-modelled by developers, Queensberry Real Estate, as the "Tunsgate Quarter", between 2016 and 2018.

== See also ==
- Corn exchanges in England
