= Willis Museum =

Municipal building in Basingstoke, Hampshire, England

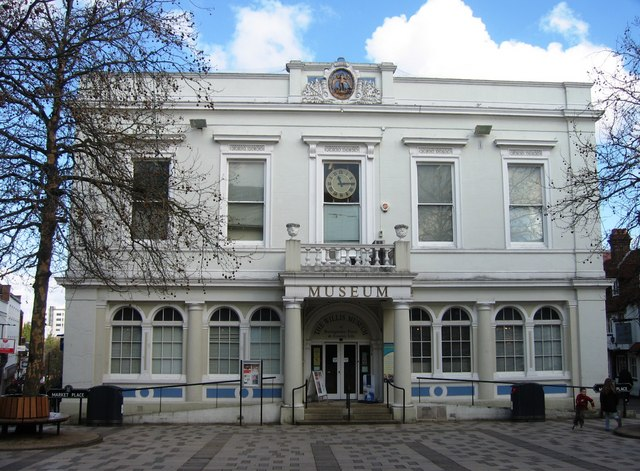
- The old Town Hall, now the Willis Museum

- Shown in Hampshire
- 51°15′46″N 1°05′13″W
- Location: Market Place, Basingstoke

History
- Built: 1835

Site notes
- Architect: Lewis Wyatt
- Architectural style: Neoclassical style

Listed Building – Grade II
- Official name: Town hall with attached drinking fountain
- Designated: 6 November 1984
- Reference no.: 1230876

The Willis Museum is a local history museum in the Market Place, Basingstoke, Hampshire, England. The building, which was formerly known as Basingstoke Town Hall, is a Grade II listed building.

== History ==
=== The building ===
Since the 14th century a Mote Hall was situated in Market Place, just to the east of Lloyds Bank. The present building, which was designed in the neoclassical style by Lewis Wyatt, was completed in 1835. It was topped by a modest clock tower, which in 1887 was replaced by a far larger Jubilee Memorial clock tower. The latter was demolished 'as an allegedly unsafe structure' in 1961, but the clock movement survived (and is presently on display in the museum): made for the old Mote Hall by John Atkins of Lichfield in 1760, it had been reused in the new town hall in 1832, and then reused again in 1887 (with an additional train provided by J. W. Benson to chime the quarters).

The building initially had an open arcade around the lower level, which served as a corn exchange and market, but when a new corn exchange was built, just to the north, it was enclosed and repurposed as office space. The rest of the building operated as a town hall and magistrates' court. Dances were sometimes held in the room upstairs. In 1922 the council bought a large house called Goldings at 5 London Road to serve as its municipal offices, but continued to use the town hall as its meeting place until the council was abolished by the Local Government Act 1972 in 1974. The larger Basingstoke District Council (renamed Basingstoke and Deane in 1978) built itself a new headquarters incorporating a council chamber in the grounds of Goldings with the new building being completed in 1976, after which the town hall became redundant.

=== The museum ===
The museum was originally housed in the old (now demolished) Mechanics' Institute building in New Road. It was founded by the local clockmaker, George W. Willis, as the Basingstoke Museum in 1931. Renamed after the founder in 1956, the Willis Museum was expanded to cover the town and surrounding area's history, from the Upper Cretaceous Age through to the development experienced during the 1960s and 1970s. It moved to the Town Hall in 1984. As well as funding from visitor donations, the Willis Museum receives grant funding from Basingstoke and Deane Borough Council.

== Exhibitions ==
Displays covers local history, including remains of an ancient human known as "Basingstoke Man" and what is rumoured to be the world’s oldest wedding cake. In 2014, the museum faced criticism after some medieval coins, donated by a local treasure hunter, were removed from display.

In January 2018 the museum faced criticism after specialist job roles were cut as part of a restructure of the wider Hampshire Cultural Trust service.

The museum is home to the Sainsbury Gallery, which hosts temporary exhibitions. The gallery was added to the museum in 2008 with funding by the Linbury Trust, founded by Lord Sainsbury. Previous exhibitions in the Sainsbury Gallery have included:

- May The Toys Be With You
- Turner and the Sun
- Alice in Wonderland

== Jane Austen statue ==
Situated outside the museum is a statue of Jane Austen. The life-sized bronze figure was created by sculptor Adam Roud as part of a series of events marking the 200th anniversary of the writer's death. It is considered to be the first of Austen in the world. The events were credited with boosting the previously falling number of visitors to the museum, though it is unknown for how long or successfully this effect will last.

The location was chosen as it is speculated to be the same square Austen would have visited to go shopping or to dance at the assembly rooms nearby. The statue was unveiled at a public ceremony attended by civic figures as well as Austen fans (or "Janeites") in Regency costume. Jane Austen spent the first 25 years of her life in nearby Steventon, where her father was vicar. Roud claimed that the statue represents Austen as a "daughter and a sister" as she walked through the town.
