= Corn Exchange, Tonbridge =

Historic building in Tonbridge, Kent, England

The Corn Exchange
- Tonbridge
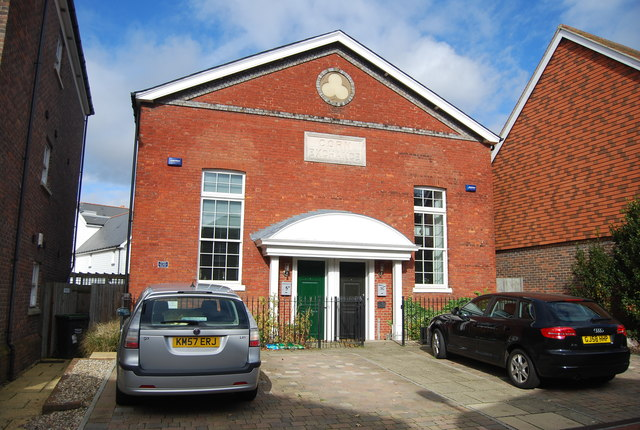
- The Corn Exchange

Site information
- Type: Drill hall

Location
- Location within Kent
- Coordinates: 51.19761°N 0.27466°E

Site history
- Built: 1791
- Built for: War Office
- In use: 1791-Present

The Corn Exchange is a former chapel, trading facility and military installation at Bank Street (formerly Back Street) in Tonbridge, Kent.

== History ==
The building was originally commissioned as a chapel for the Independent Congregationalists and was referred to as the "Independent Chapel". It was built in red brick and completed on 19 March 1791. The design involved a main frontage of three bays facing onto Bank Street, which was previously known as Back Street. The central bay featured a small portico formed by four columns supporting an entablature. The outer bays were fenestrated by mullioned and transomed windows with pointed heads and hood moulds. The frontage was surmounted by a pediment with a circular panel containing a trefoil in the tympanum. The building was enlarged in 1847.

The Independent Congregationalists moved out to new premises in the High Street in 1876 and the chapel became used as the local Corn Exchange. However, the use of the building as a corn exchange declined significantly in the wake of the Great Depression of British Agriculture in the late 19th century.

The building was then converted to become the headquarters of the 4th Battalion, The Queen's Own (Royal West Kent Regiment) in 1910. It also became the headquarters of the Kent Cyclist Battalion at this time. The 4th Battalion was mobilised at the drill hall in August 1914 before being deployed to India.

The battalion merged with the 5th Battalion to form the 4th/5th Battalion in 1947. Following the cut-backs in 1967, the presence at the drill hall was reduced to a single company, E Company, 5th (Volunteer) Battalion, The Queen's Regiment. The drill hall was subsequently decommissioned and converted for commercial use.

== See also ==
- Corn exchanges in England
