= Corn Exchange, Bury St Edmunds =

Municipal building in Bury St Edmunds, Suffolk, England

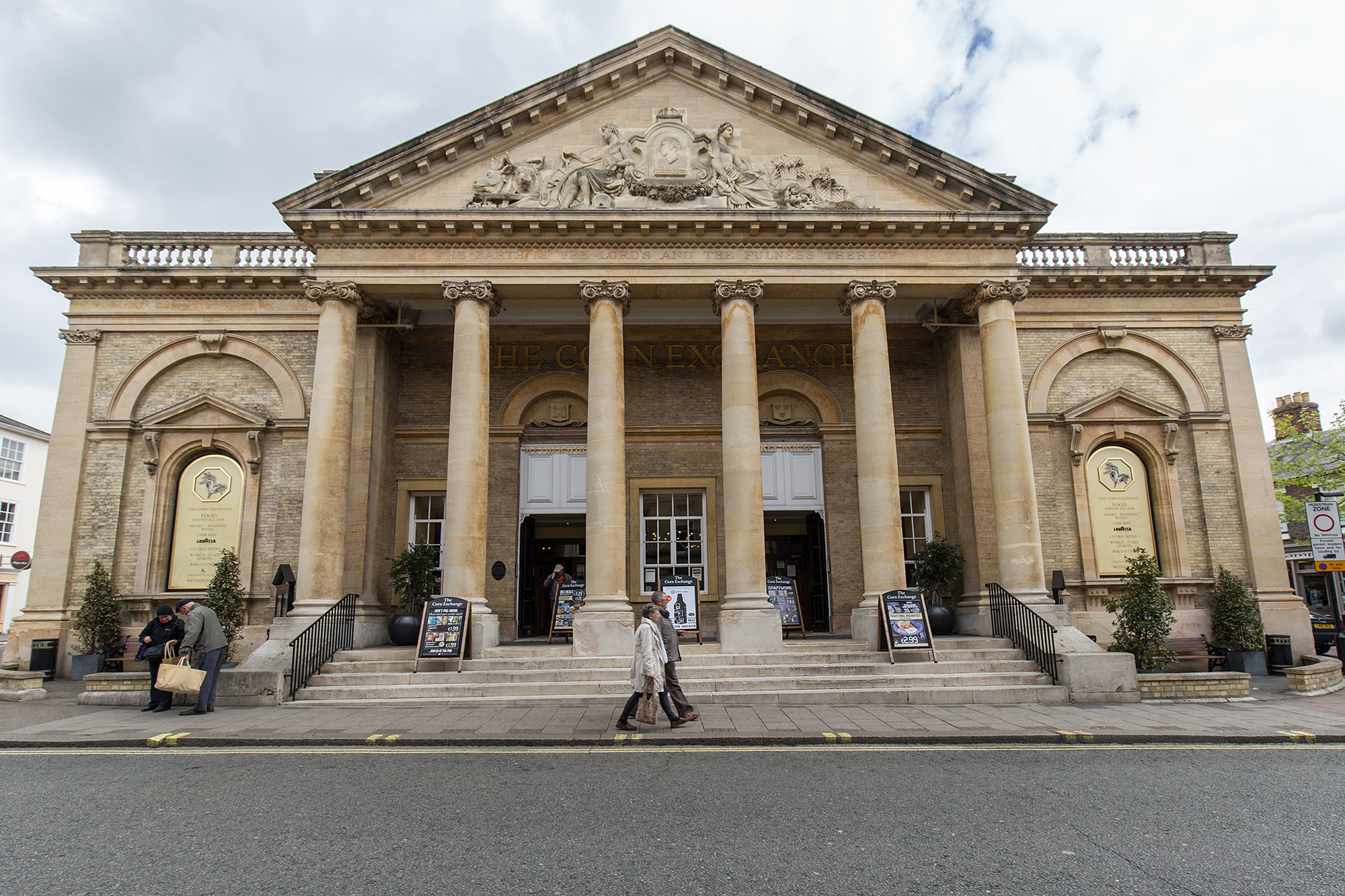
- Corn Exchange, Bury St Edmunds

- Shown in Suffolk
- 52.2449°N 0.7123°E
- Location: Abbeygate Street, Bury St Edmunds

History
- Built: 1862

Site notes
- Architect(s): Ellis and Woodard
- Architectural style: Neoclassical style

Listed Building – Grade II
- Official name: Corn Exchange
- Designated: 7 August 1952
- Reference no.: 1076928

The Corn Exchange is a commercial building in Abbeygate Street in Bury St Edmunds, Suffolk, England. The structure, which is currently used as a public house, is a Grade II listed building.

== History ==
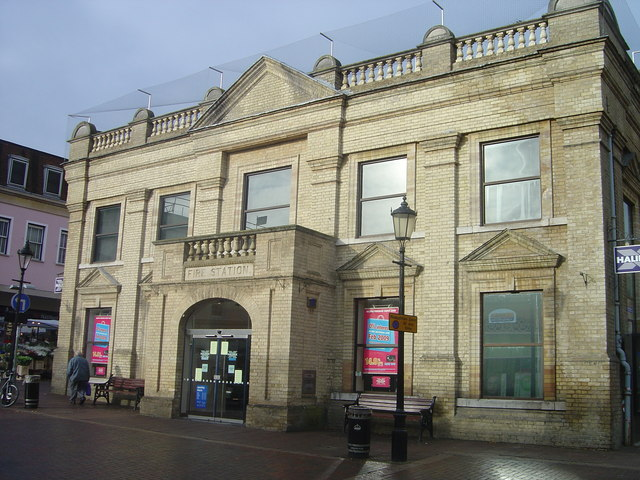
The corn exchange of 1836

The first corn exchange in the town was on the ground floor of the old Market Cross in Cornhill which dated from 1584. The second corn exchange was designed by Benjamin Backson, built in ashlar stone and was completed, just to the south of the Market Cross, in 1836. (Note: The second corn exchange went on to become a public library, with a fire station at the south end, and was later converted for retail use.) By the mid-19th century, the second corn exchange became inadequate, and civic leaders decided to commission a new corn exchange on the site of the old Shambles, just to the south of the second building.

The foundation stone for the current building was laid by the mayor, William Henry Rushbrooke, on 18 June 1861. It was designed by Ellis and Woodard of Fenchurch Street in London in the neoclassical style, built by Lot Jackaman in ashlar stone at a cost of £7,000 and was officially opened by the then-mayor, Charles Beard, on 16 July 1862. The design involved a symmetrical main frontage of seven bays facing onto Abbeygate Street. The central section of five bays featured a huge hexastyle portico formed by Ionic order columns supporting an entablature, a frieze bearing the inscription "The Earth is the Lord's and the Fulness Thereof", and a modillioned pediment with a bust of Queen Victoria flanked by figures depicting agriculture in the tympanum. The outer bays featured blocked round headed windows with architraves and pediments supported by brackets. Internally, the principal room was the main hall which was originally open but later surmounted by a glass roof supported by cast-iron columns and semi-circular stone arches: it was 119 feet (36 m) long and 82 feet (25 m) wide.

The use of the building as a corn exchange declined significantly in the wake of the Great Depression of British Agriculture in the late 19th century. In the 1960s, Bury St Edmunds Borough Council proposed the demolition of both the second and the third corn exchanges in order to create a parade of shops: the scheme was abandoned in the face of strong public opposition. Instead, a floor was inserted allowing shops to be established on the ground floor in 1969. This also enabled the first floor to be used as an events venue and subsequent performers included the rock band, Slade, in April 1972 and the rock band, the Clash, in July 1978. Following disturbances associated with the latter performance, the council banned live performances in the town for 20 years. In July 2024, a local history society, the Bury Society, decided to oppose calls for a blue plaque to commemorate the performance by the Clash as the event had promoted "unruly behaviour".

A major programme of refurbishment works, commissioned by Wetherspoons at a cost of £1.4 million and intended to allow the first floor to be used as a public house, started on site in 2011. After completion of the works, which involved the restoration of many of the original features including the entrance hall and main staircase, the building re-opened on 5 June 2012.

== See also ==
- Corn exchanges in England
