= Corn Exchange, Worcester =

Commercial building in Worcester, Worcestershire, England

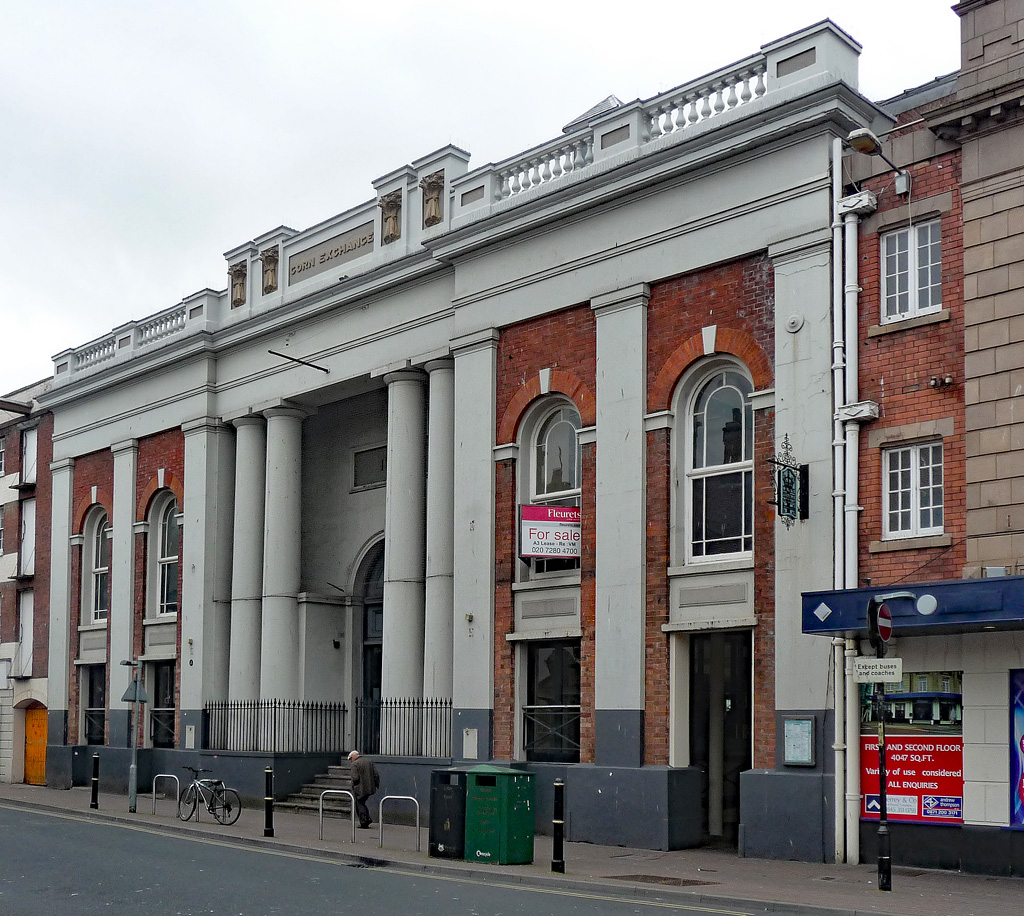
- Corn Exchange, Worcester

- Shown in Worcestershire
- 52.1934°N 2.2224°W
- Location: Angel Street, Worcester

History
- Built: 1849

Site notes
- Architect: Henry Rowe
- Architectural style: Italianate style

Listed Building – Grade II
- Official name: Former Corn Exchange and attached railings
- Designated: 5 April 1971
- Reference no.: 1359548

The Corn Exchange is a commercial building in Angel Street, Worcester, Worcestershire, England. The structure, which is currently vacant, is a Grade II listed building.

== History ==
Until the mid-19th century, corn merchants conducted their trade in the Corn Market on the east side of the city. Following the repeal of the Corn Laws in 1846, civic leaders decided to commission a purpose-built corn exchange for the city. After some disagreement over the selection of the site, a group of Conservative-leaning farmers and county landowners decided to proceed with new building on a city centre site on the south side of Angel Street.

The building was designed by Henry Rowe in the Italianate style, built by Joseph Wood in red brick with stone dressings at a cost of £5,000 and was completed in 1849. The design involved a symmetrical main frontage of five bays facing onto Angel Street. The central bay, which was recessed, contained a tall round headed doorway with an architrave and a keystone. The doorway and the date stone above were flanked by pairs of full-height Tuscan order columns in antis supporting an entablature, a cornice and a panel inscribed with the words "Corn Exchange"; the panel was flanked by pairs of pedestals decorated by carvings of wheatsheaves. The outer bays, which contained doorways on the ground floor and round headed windows with voussoirs and keystones on the first floor, were flanked by full height pilasters supporting entablatures and balustraded parapets. The architectural historian, Nikolaus Pevsner, was impressed with the design describing it as "a mighty job, only five bays, but with truly colossal pairs of Tuscan columns in antis". Internally, the principal room was the main hall which was 70 feet (21 m) long and 60 feet (18 m) wide.

There was strong competition from a rival corn exchange, which had been established by a group of Whig-leaning corn merchants, who had wanted to keep corn trading in the Corn Market. However, that corn exchange opened a little later and therefore became redundant. It was sold and converted into a music hall in 1853. After being known as the "Public Hall", it became "The Majestic" shortly before it was demolished in 1966.

The use of the Angel Street building as a corn exchange declined significantly in the wake of the Great Depression of British Agriculture in the late 19th century. It was used as an auction room before serving as a boxing arena from 1900 to 1930. It was also used as a carpet warehouse, before being occupied by Habitat, as that chain developed nationally in the 1980s. In the early 21st century it operated as an Ask Italian restaurant until that also closed in January 2013.

In 2021, Worcester City Council acquired the vacant building and subsequently announced plans prepared by architects, Burrell Foley Fischer, to develop the corn exchange as the foyer to an arts centre, the main auditorium for the which would be in the adjacent Scala Theatre building.

== See also ==
- Corn exchanges in England
