= Alexandra Theatre, Newton Abbot =

Entertainment complex in Newton Abbot, Devon, England

Alexandra Theatre
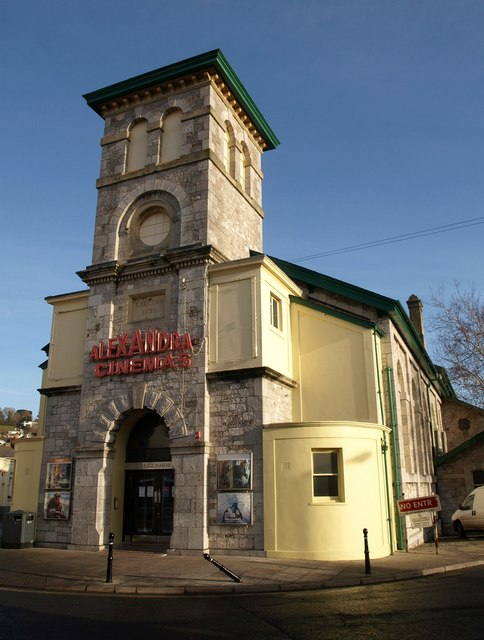
- Alexandra Theatre

- Shown in Devon
- 50.5308°N 3.6119°W
- Location: Market Street, Newton Abbot

History
- Built: 1871

Site notes
- Architect: John Chudleigh
- Architectural style: Italianate style

Listed Building – Grade II
- Official name: Alexandra Theatre and Market Hall to the rear
- Designated: 6 June 1972
- Reference no.: 1256893

The Alexandra Theatre is an entertainment complex in Market Street, Newton Abbot, Devon, England. The structure, which was commissioned as a corn exchange and is currently used as a cinema, is a Grade II listed building.

== History ==
The building was commissioned as a corn exchange by the Newton Abbot local board. It formed part of a broader programme of improvements, which also included a new market hall, and, after being authorised by act of parliament in 1868, was facilitated by diverting the River Lemon into a culvert.

The building was designed by a local architect, John Chudleigh, in the Italianate style, built in limestone and was completed in 1871. The design involved a three-stage tower facing west down Market Street. The first stage involved a round headed opening with voussoirs and a keystone surmounted by a date stone. The second stage involved a round headed recess containing an oculus, while the third stage involved a pair of round headed windows. The tower was surmounted by a modillioned cornice and a shallow pyramid-shaped roof. The side elevations, of five bays on either side, featured tall round headed windows with voussoirs and keystones.

The volume of corn changing hands in the town declined significantly in the wake of the Great Depression of British Agriculture in the late 19th century, and, even before it opened, the local board decided to convert the building for public use as the "Alexandra Hall". It was named after Princess Alexandra of Denmark who had requested large amounts of Devon lace for the dress she wore at her wedding to the Prince of Wales in March 1863.

The building was converted into a theatre with a stage and a proscenium arch to a design by local architect, Frank Matcham, in 1883. The building was further enhanced by the addition of curved sections with a stucco finish, on either side of the tower, in the early 20th century, and the windows were filled to allow silent films to be shown in 1920. Further improvements include the installation of a balcony and raked seating in 1926.

The interior was remodelled to create a new foyer in 1978 and the balcony area was altered to create a second auditorium in 1996. Since then, the building has operated as a theatre supported by the Newton Abbot and District Musical Comedy Society, for three weeks a year, and as a cinema under the management of local operators, Scott Cinemas, for the rest of year.

In January 2022, Teignbridge District Council announced proposals to redevelop Newton Abbot town centre: the plans, which would have involved the demolition of the interior of the Alexandra Theatre to create an enlarged market hall, met with strong opposition from local people. The council eventually agreed to modify the proposals to avoid damaging the interior of the theatre.

== See also ==
- Corn exchanges in England
