= Corn Exchange, Lichfield =

Commercial building in Lichfield, Staffordshire, England

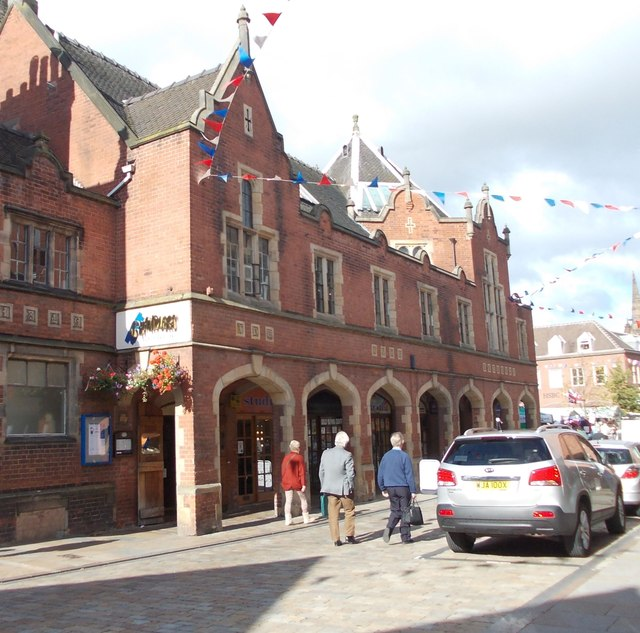
- Corn Exchange, Lichfield

- Shown in Staffordshire
- 52.6835°N 1.8270°W
- Location: Conduit Street, Lichfield

History
- Built: 1850

Site notes
- Architect(s): Thomas Johnson and Son
- Architectural style: Tudor Revival style

Listed Building – Grade II
- Official name: The Corn Exchange
- Designated: 6 March 1970
- Reference no.: 1209913

The Corn Exchange is a commercial building in Conduit Street, Lichfield, Staffordshire, England. The structure, which is used as a series of shops on the ground floor and as a restaurant on the first floor, is a Grade II listed building.

== History ==
Until the mid-19th century, corn merchants traded in a market hall on the southwest side of Conduit Street. It was erected in the aftermath of the English Civil War in the 1650s, rebuilt in the early 1730s, and, rebuilt again, in 1797. In 1848, a group of local businessmen decided to form a company, to be known as the "Lichfield Market Hall and Corn Exchange Company", to finance and commission a new combined market hall and corn exchange for the city: the site they chose was on the northeast side of Conduit street where a row of houses had stood.

The new building was designed by a local firm of architects, Thomas Johnson and Son, in the Tudor Revival style, built by Messrs Collyer and Scott in red brick with ashlar dressings at a cost of £2,500, and was completed in 1850. The design involved an asymmetrical main frontage of seven bays facing onto Conduit Street. There was a vaulted arcade formed by seven arches with voussoirs and keystones on the ground floor. Above the arcade, there were a series of small square panels with raised letters inscribed to read "The Corn Exchange". The first floor was fenestrated by a three-light mullioned window in the first bay, a row of two-light mullioned windows in the next four bays, a three-light mullioned window in the sixth bay and a two-light mullioned window in the last bay. The first and sixth bays were surmounted by shaped gables with pinnacles. There was also a two bay recessed section to the left which featured a prominent first floor oriel window in the left-hand bay. Internally, the principal rooms were the market hall on the ground floor and an assembly hall, which featured an octagonally-shaped wall at the north end and a hammerbeam roof, on the first floor.

The use of the building as a corn exchange declined significantly in the wake of the Great Depression of British Agriculture in the late 19th century. After the company that had originally developed the building got into financial difficulty, Lichfield Corporation acquired the building in February 1902. The assembly hall on the first floor, which had accommodated the corn traders, was requisitioned for military use during the First World War and then accommodated the Lichfield City Institute from 1920. In the 1970s, the market hall on the ground floor was converted into a series of shops, while the assembly hall was converted for use as a restaurant, which was re-branded, in November 2014, as "McKenzie's In The City".

== See also ==
- Corn exchanges in England
