= Royal Commission on the Depression in Trade and Industry =

Royal Commission of the UK

The Royal Commission on the Depression in Trade and Industry was a Royal Commission of the United Kingdom set up by the Prime Minister Lord Salisbury's minority Conservative government in August 1885 and completed in December 1886. It occurred during the Great Depression of 1873–1896.

The decision by Salisbury to appoint this Royal Commission has been seen as a way of easing the pressure on the Conservative Party from "fair traders" who opposed the prevailing free trade orthodoxy. The former Liberal ministers who Salisbury wished to appoint to the Royal Commission, such as John Kynaston Cross, declined to do so because such an inquiry implicitly questioned the validity of free trade.

The Commission was chaired by Lord Iddesleigh, a free trader. William Rubinstein has noted that the "commission was notable for being one of the first to acknowledge Britain's disadvantages as the earliest industrial country at a time of intense foreign competition. Its recommendations were moderate, and Iddesleigh's chairmanship ensured that it did not stray from free-trade orthodoxy despite the growing calls for protection from many tories".
