= Capital and Counties Bank =

Capital and Counties Bank Limited
- Company type: Joint-stock company
- Industry: Banking
- Predecessor: Hampshire Banking Co. North Wilts Banking Co.
- Founded: 1877; 149 years ago
- Defunct: 1918; 108 years ago
- Successor: Lloyds Bank
- Headquarters: London, United Kingdom

The Capital and Counties Bank was a London clearing bank, which operated 473 branches throughout the United Kingdom from 1877 until its acquisition by Lloyds Bank in 1918.

== History ==
The bank was formed as the Hampshire and North Wilts Banking Company, following the merger of the Hampshire Banking Company and the North Wilts Banking Company. It was renamed Capital and Counties Bank in 1878. The Hampshire Banking Company had been established in Southampton in 1834 and the North Wilts Banking Company in Melksham in 1835, from the private bank of Moule & Co. founded in 1792.

Lloyds Bank offered to acquire the bank on the terms of one Lloyds share, plus £2 cash, for each Capital and Counties share in 1918, with the accounts of the two banks at the Bank of England being merged on 24 August 1918. The process of integration was difficult and it was not until 1934 that Capital and Counties Committee of Directors ceased to operate as a separate entity.
