= List of listed buildings in Kelso, Scottish Borders =

This is a list of listed buildings in the parish of Kelso in the Scottish Borders, Scotland.

== List ==
Name	Location	Date Listed	Grid Ref. (Note: Sometimes known as OSGB36, the grid reference (where provided) is based on the British national grid reference system used by the Ordnance Survey. • "Guide to National Grid". Ordnance Survey. • "Get-a-map". Ordnance Survey.)	Geo-coordinates	Notes	LB Number (Note: Historic Environment Scotland assign a unique alphanumeric identifier to each designated site in Scotland, for listed buildings this always begins with "LB", for example "LB12345".)	Image
13, 15, 17 Horsemarket				55°35′56″N 2°25′58″W	Category B	35753	Upload Photo
2, 4, 6 Horsemarket				55°35′56″N 2°26′00″W	Category B	35756	Upload Photo
46-48 Horsemarket				55°35′58″N 2°25′55″W	Category C(S)	35759	Upload Photo
Maxwell Lane 'Dalveen'				55°35′52″N 2°25′45″W	Category C(S)	35768	Upload another image
Maxwell Lane, Maxwell Place And Bellachroy				55°35′52″N 2°25′44″W	Category B	35769	Upload another image
3, 4, And 5, 6 Maxwellheugh Terrace				55°35′33″N 2°25′52″W	Category B	35772	Upload another image
1, 3, 5 Roxburgh Street				55°35′55″N 2°26′06″W	Category B	35783	Upload Photo
9 Roxburgh Street				55°35′56″N 2°26′06″W	Category C(S)	35784	Upload Photo
31-33 Sheddon Park Road				55°35′57″N 2°25′44″W	Category C(S)	35815	Upload another image
10, 11 The Square				55°35′53″N 2°26′03″W	Category B	35832	Upload Photo
15 The Square				55°35′53″N 2°26′04″W	Category B	35833	Upload Photo
18, 19 The Square				55°35′54″N 2°26′04″W	Category B	35834	Upload Photo
21, 22 The Square, Kelso Savings Bank				55°35′54″N 2°26′05″W	Category C(S)	35837	Upload Photo
38, 39, 40 The Square				55°35′56″N 2°26′03″W	Category B	35843	Upload Photo
42, 44, 45, 46 The Square				55°35′56″N 2°26′02″W	Category B	35844	Upload Photo
Teviot Bridge				55°35′41″N 2°26′46″W	Category A	35847	Upload another image
9, 11, 13, 15 Union Street				55°35′58″N 2°26′07″W	Category C(S)	35849	Upload Photo
21 And 23 Woodmarket Sinclair Mcgill, Nursery-Men And Seedsmen				55°35′55″N 2°25′58″W	Category B	35857	Upload Photo
15, 16, 26, 28, 30 Abbey Court, Belmont Place And Gatepiers				55°35′46″N 2°26′00″W	Category B	35693	Upload Photo
Bridge Street, Abbey House (Offices Of Croall & Bryson)				55°35′49″N 2°25′58″W	Category B	35723	Upload Photo
Bridge Street, Queens Head Hotel				55°35′51″N 2°26′00″W	Category B	35729	Upload another image
36, 38 Bridge Street				55°35′51″N 2°25′59″W	Category C(S)	35731	Upload Photo
Bridge Street Kelso Abbey				55°35′50″N 2°25′57″W	Category A	35734	Upload another image
Hermitage Lane Pointfield				55°35′55″N 2°25′33″W	Category B	35750	Upload Photo
1, 3 Horsemarket				55°35′55″N 2°26′00″W	Category B	35751	Upload Photo
Crawford Street, Red Lion Inn				55°35′57″N 2°26′05″W	Category C(S)	51109	Upload Photo
12, 14 Woodmarket Border Hotel				55°35′55″N 2°25′59″W	Category C(S)	35864	Upload another image
40-42 Woodmarket				55°35′56″N 2°25′56″W	Category C(S)	35867	Upload Photo
50 Horsemarket				55°35′59″N 2°25′55″W	Category C(S)	35760	Upload Photo
Jedburgh Road Maxwellheugh Cottage				55°35′35″N 2°25′56″W	Category B	35763	Upload Photo
Mill Wynd, Kelso Mills, (John Hogarth Ltd)				55°35′52″N 2°26′08″W	Category B	35775	Upload Photo
9, 11 Oven Wynd (North Side) And Unnumbered House (Veitch)				55°35′52″N 2°26′05″W	Category C(S)	35778	Upload Photo
13, 15 Oven Wynd (North Side)				55°35′52″N 2°26′06″W	Category C(S)	35779	Upload Photo
Oven Wynd, (South Side) Premises Of J Utterson And J Walker, Plumbers And Slaters				55°35′52″N 2°26′04″W	Category C(S)	35782	Upload Photo
48 Roxburgh Street				55°35′58″N 2°26′11″W	Category B	35796	Upload Photo
132-134 Roxburgh Street				55°36′06″N 2°26′24″W	Category C(S)	35804	Upload Photo
15-23 Sheddon Park Road (Odd Nos)				55°35′56″N 2°25′47″W	Category C(S)	35812	Upload another image See more images
Shedden Park Road Tweedbank With Walled Garden, Boundary Walls And Gatepiers				55°36′00″N 2°25′34″W	Category B	35819	Upload Photo
Shedden Park Road, Rosebank				55°36′05″N 2°25′24″W	Category B	35820	Upload Photo
The Square, Kelso Town Hall				55°35′55″N 2°26′01″W	Category B	35828	Upload another image
33, 34, 35 The Square				55°35′56″N 2°26′05″W	Category B	35841	Upload Photo
47, 48, 49 The Square				55°35′56″N 2°26′01″W	Category B	35845	Upload Photo
7 Woodmarket				55°35′54″N 2°25′59″W	Category B	35854	Upload Photo
7 Abbey Court				55°35′49″N 2°26′01″W	Category B	35687	Upload Photo
10 Abbey Row				55°35′54″N 2°25′58″W	Category B	35695	Upload Photo
Abbotsford Grove Korea House				55°35′52″N 2°25′37″W	Category B	35698	Upload another image See more images
3, 4, 5, 6, Bowmont Street				55°35′56″N 2°26′01″W	Category C(S)	35699	Upload Photo
22 Bowmont Street Bowmont House				55°35′59″N 2°26′06″W	Category B	35703	Upload Photo
Bowmont Street Orchard House, Orchard Cottage, And Dovecot				55°36′11″N 2°26′29″W	Category B	35711	Upload Photo
1 Bridge Street				55°35′52″N 2°26′03″W	Category B	35713	Upload Photo
Bridge Street, Ednam House Hotel Gatepiers				55°35′48″N 2°26′01″W	Category B	35719	Upload Photo
40 - 44 (Even Nos) Bridge Street And 2, 2A Abbey Row				55°35′50″N 2°25′59″W	Category B	35732	Upload another image
Broomlands House				55°36′24″N 2°25′21″W	Category B	35738	Upload Photo
Edenside Road Edenside				55°36′10″N 2°25′47″W	Category B	35747	Upload Photo
Hermitage Lane Hermitage				55°35′58″N 2°25′35″W	Category B	35749	Upload Photo
Horsemarket, Black Swan				55°35′55″N 2°25′59″W	Category C(S)	35752	Upload Photo
Springwood Estate, (Springwood Caravan Park), Walled Garden				55°35′38″N 2°27′16″W	Category B	12954	Upload Photo
Springwood Estate, Springwood Home Farm				55°35′23″N 2°27′06″W	Category B	12955	Upload Photo
65 Horsemarket				55°35′59″N 2°25′53″W	Category C(S)	35755	Upload Photo
44 Horsemarket Former Post Office				55°35′58″N 2°25′56″W	Category B	35758	Upload Photo
The Knowes, Waverley Lodge				55°35′51″N 2°25′46″W	Category C(S)	35767	Upload another image
7, 8 Maxwellheugh Terrace				55°35′34″N 2°25′53″W	Category B	35773	Upload another image
Oven Wynd, Ramsay Lodge				55°35′52″N 2°26′08″W	Category B	35780	Upload Photo
3, 4 Oven Wynd (South Side)				55°35′52″N 2°26′03″W	Category C(S)	35781	Upload Photo
2, 4 Roxburgh Street				55°35′55″N 2°26′06″W	Category B	35792	Upload Photo
18, 20, 22, 24 Roxburgh Street				55°35′56″N 2°26′08″W	Category B	35795	Upload Photo
60 Roxburgh Street				55°35′59″N 2°26′11″W	Category B	35798	Upload Photo
126 Roxburgh Street				55°36′05″N 2°26′22″W	Category B	35803	Upload Photo
142 Roxburgh Street				55°36′07″N 2°26′28″W	Category C(S)	35808	Upload Photo
51 Sheddon Park Road, Lyme House				55°35′59″N 2°25′39″W	Category C(S)	35817	Upload Photo
3 Simon Square				55°35′56″N 2°25′53″W	Category B	35825	Upload Photo
3, 4, 5, 6 Winchester Row				55°36′04″N 2°26′16″W	Category C(S)	35852	Upload Photo
Abbey Court St Andrew's Episcopal Church And Churyard Walls				55°35′47″N 2°26′01″W	Category B	35689	Upload Photo
Bridge Street, Ednam House Hotel				55°35′51″N 2°26′04″W	Category A	35716	Upload another image
Bridge Street Bridge-End Cottage				55°35′45″N 2°25′58″W	Category A	35724	Upload Photo
4, 6, 8 Bridge Street				55°35′53″N 2°26′01″W	Category B	35725	Upload another image
14 Bridge Street				55°35′52″N 2°26′00″W	Category C(S)	35727	Upload Photo
Edenside Road Kerfield				55°36′08″N 2°25′45″W	Category B	35746	Upload Photo
Springwood Estate (Springwood Caravan Park), Scott-Douglas Mausoleum				55°35′42″N 2°27′18″W	Category A	12952	Upload another image
Wooden House				55°35′47″N 2°24′47″W	Category B	10471	Upload Photo
Steward's House In Floors Castle Policies				55°36′25″N 2°28′06″W	Category B	10478	Upload Photo
8, 10 Woodmarket				55°35′55″N 2°26′00″W	Category C(S)	35863	Upload Photo
32-38 Woodmarket (Even Nos.)				55°35′56″N 2°25′57″W	Category B	35866	Upload Photo
44-50 Woodmarket (Even Nos.)				55°35′57″N 2°25′55″W	Category C(S)	35868	Upload Photo
The Square, K6 Telephone Kiosk Adjacent To Town Hall				55°35′55″N 2°26′01″W	Category B	35870	Upload Photo
52 Horsemarket				55°35′59″N 2°25′55″W	Category C(S)	35761	Upload Photo
Kelso Bridge				55°35′43″N 2°26′00″W	Category A	35764	Upload Photo
The Knowes; Abbey Bank				55°35′50″N 2°25′49″W	Category B	35765	Upload another image
21 Roxburgh Street				55°35′57″N 2°26′07″W	Category B	35785	Upload Photo
47-49 Roxburgh Street				55°35′58″N 2°26′08″W	Category C(S)	35789	Upload Photo
108 Roxburgh Street Falcon Hall				55°36′04″N 2°26′18″W	Category B	35802	Upload Photo
Roxburgh Street Walton Hall, And Stable Wing				55°36′06″N 2°26′26″W	Category A	35805	Upload Photo
Roxburgh Street Walton Hall, Entrance Gateways And Wall				55°36′06″N 2°26′26″W	Category A	35806	Upload Photo
1 The Square And Abbey Row				55°35′54″N 2°25′59″W	Category B	35829	Upload Photo
20 The Square				55°35′54″N 2°26′04″W	Category B	35835	Upload Photo
The Square, Robert Macdonald(Now Peter Dominic)				55°35′54″N 2°26′05″W	Category B	35836	Upload Photo
26, 27, 29 The Square				55°35′55″N 2°26′06″W	Category B	35839	Upload Photo
1 Union Street				55°35′58″N 2°26′08″W	Category C(S)	35848	Upload Photo
8 Abbey Court Turret House				55°35′48″N 2°26′00″W	Category B	35692	Upload Photo
7 Bowmont Street Commercial Inn				55°35′57″N 2°26′02″W	Category C(S)	35700	Upload Photo
5, 7 Bridge Street				55°35′52″N 2°26′02″W	Category C(S)	35714	Upload Photo
31 Bridge Street Wares And Mcdonald				55°35′50″N 2°26′00″W	Category B	35722	Upload Photo
46 Bridge Street And 1 Abbey Row				55°35′50″N 2°25′58″W	Category C(S)	35733	Upload another image
Butts, Property Of 2Nd Roxburghe Discretionary Trust				55°35′53″N 2°25′49″W	Category C(S)	35740	Upload another image
1 Cross Street				55°35′59″N 2°25′53″W	Category C(S)	35743	Upload Photo
Wooden Gardener's House, Icehouse				55°35′51″N 2°24′41″W	Category C(S)	10472	Upload Photo
Kelso Racecourse, Grandstand				55°36′46″N 2°26′12″W	Category A	51742	Upload another image See more images
41 Woodmarket				55°35′56″N 2°25′54″W	Category C(S)	35861	Upload Photo
2, 6 Woodmarket				55°35′55″N 2°26′00″W	Category C(S)	35862	Upload Photo
Mill Wynd, Kelso Mills, Offices				55°35′52″N 2°26′09″W	Category B	35776	Upload Photo
37, 39, 41, 43 Roxburgh Street				55°35′58″N 2°26′08″W	Category B	35788	Upload Photo
6, 12 Roxburgh Street				55°35′55″N 2°26′07″W	Category C(S)	35793	Upload Photo
14, 16, Roxburgh Street				55°35′55″N 2°26′07″W	Category C(S)	35794	Upload Photo
106 Roxburgh Street And Ormiston Cottage				55°36′03″N 2°26′18″W	Category B	35801	Upload Photo
146 Roxburgh Street				55°36′07″N 2°26′29″W	Category B	35810	Upload Photo
47-49 Sheddon Park Road				55°35′59″N 2°25′40″W	Category C(S)	35816	Upload Photo
Shedden Park Road Rosebank, Lodge And Gatepiers				55°36′06″N 2°25′27″W	Category C(S)	35821	Upload Photo
Shedden Park Road Gateway To Shedden Park				55°36′00″N 2°25′40″W	Category B	35822	Upload Photo
Sprouston Road Pinnaclehill Lodge And Gatepiers				55°35′35″N 2°25′41″W	Category C(S)	35827	Upload Photo
30, 31, 32 The Square				55°35′56″N 2°26′05″W	Category B	35840	Upload Photo
The Square Cross Keys Hotel				55°35′56″N 2°26′03″W	Category B	35842	Upload another image See more images
4 Union Street				55°35′58″N 2°26′08″W	Category C(S)	35850	Upload Photo
6 Union Street				55°35′59″N 2°26′08″W	Category C(S)	35851	Upload Photo
1, 3, 5 Woodmarket				55°35′54″N 2°26′00″W	Category B	35853	Upload Photo
13, 15, 17, 19 Woodmarket				55°35′54″N 2°25′59″W	Category B	35856	Upload Photo
Woodmarket, Corn Exchange				55°35′55″N 2°25′56″W	Category B	35859	Upload another image
3 Abbey Court				55°35′49″N 2°26′00″W	Category B	35685	Upload Photo
Bowmont Street R C Church Of The Immaculate Conception				55°36′09″N 2°26′24″W	Category C(S)	35707	Upload Photo
Bowmont Street, Kelso High School, Formerly Kelso Academy				55°36′12″N 2°26′21″W	Category B	35712	Upload Photo
Bridge Street Ednam House Hotel, Garden House				55°35′51″N 2°26′07″W	Category B	35717	Upload Photo
Bridge Street Ednam House Hotel, Garden Walls And Terrace Walls				55°35′48″N 2°26′01″W	Category B	35718	Upload Photo
21 And 23-25 Bridge Street				55°35′50″N 2°26′00″W	Category B	35720	Upload Photo
10, 12 Bridge Street				55°35′52″N 2°26′01″W	Category C(S)	35726	Upload another image
30,32 Bridge Street				55°35′51″N 2°25′59″W	Category B	35730	Upload another image
East Bowmont Street. Former Trinity North Church Of Scotland And Church Halls				55°35′59″N 2°26′01″W	Category B	35744	Upload another image See more images
4 East Bowmont Street (Colesdale House)				55°36′01″N 2°26′01″W	Category B	35745	Upload Photo
Sharpitlaw House				55°36′32″N 2°24′41″W	Category B	10473	Upload Photo
Hendersyde Park, Hendersyde West Lodge Including Quadrant Walls, Gatepiers And Part Boundary Wall				55°36′25″N 2°24′50″W	Category C(S)	10475	Upload Photo
Woodside House Hotel				55°36′14″N 2°25′36″W	Category B	35869	Upload Photo
Cauld On River Tweed				55°36′00″N 2°26′22″W	Category B	35871	Upload Photo
22 Horsemarket				55°35′57″N 2°25′58″W	Category C(S)	35757	Upload Photo
The Knowes; Walton Grove				55°35′50″N 2°25′47″W	Category C(S)	35766	Upload another image
Maxwell Lane, St Leonards				55°35′53″N 2°25′41″W	Category B	35770	Upload another image
1, 2 Maxwellheugh Terrace				55°35′32″N 2°25′51″W	Category C(S)	35771	Upload another image
Roxburgh Street Selkirk And Kelso Society Co-Op				55°35′57″N 2°26′07″W	Category C(S)	35786	Upload Photo
51 Roxburgh Street				55°35′58″N 2°26′09″W	Category B	35790	Upload Photo
66 Roxburgh Street				55°36′00″N 2°26′12″W	Category C(S)	35799	Upload another image
Roxburgh Street St John's Edenside And Ednam Church Of Scotland				55°36′02″N 2°26′13″W	Category A	35800	Upload another image See more images
1 Simon Square				55°35′56″N 2°25′53″W	Category C(S)	35824	Upload another image
Springwood Park, Gateway And Gates				55°35′38″N 2°26′08″W	Category A	35826	Upload Photo
27 Woodmarket, Wm Roxburgh (Lauder Bros Ltd) And N B Douglas Also Frazer Tennant Ltd				55°35′55″N 2°25′57″W	Category B	35858	Upload another image
Abbey Court, Gardens Shop				55°35′49″N 2°26′00″W	Category C(S)	35684	Upload Photo
5 Abbey Court				55°35′49″N 2°26′01″W	Category B	35686	Upload Photo
6 Abbey Court				55°35′48″N 2°26′00″W	Category C(S)	35691	Upload Photo
Abbey Row And The Butts, Kelso Old Parish Church, Church-Yard Wall And Gates				55°35′55″N 2°25′54″W	Category C(S)	35697	Upload another image See more images
20 Bowmont Street				55°35′59″N 2°26′05″W	Category C(S)	35702	Upload Photo
36 Bowmont Street				55°36′02″N 2°26′11″W	Category C(S)	35704	Upload Photo
38 Bowmont Street				55°36′02″N 2°26′11″W	Category C(S)	35705	Upload Photo
20 Bridge Street				55°35′52″N 2°26′00″W	Category B	35728	Upload another image
Chalkheugh Terrace Royal British Legion Club				55°36′00″N 2°26′12″W	Category C(S)	35742	Upload Photo
22, 24 Woodmarket				55°35′56″N 2°25′58″W	Category B	35865	Upload Photo
56 Horsemarket				55°35′59″N 2°25′55″W	Category C(S)	35762	Upload Photo
4, 5, 6, Mill Wynd				55°35′53″N 2°26′05″W	Category C(S)	35774	Upload Photo
35 Roxburgh Street				55°35′57″N 2°26′07″W	Category B	35787	Upload Photo
50 Roxburgh Street				55°35′58″N 2°26′10″W	Category C(S)	35797	Upload Photo
144 Roxburgh Street				55°36′07″N 2°26′28″W	Category B	35809	Upload Photo
53 Sheddon Park Road, Lyme Cottage				55°35′59″N 2°25′38″W	Category C(S)	35818	Upload Photo
Shedden Park Road Shedden Park Pavilion Or Keeper's Lodge				55°35′59″N 2°25′47″W	Category B	35823	Upload Photo
Abbey Row Masonic Lodge				55°35′54″N 2°25′58″W	Category C(S)	35694	Upload Photo
Abbey Row Kelso Old Parish Church				55°35′53″N 2°25′52″W	Category A	35696	Upload Photo
13, 14, 16 Bowmont Street				55°35′58″N 2°26′04″W	Category B	35701	Upload Photo
46 Bowmont Street Allanbank				55°36′04″N 2°26′14″W	Category C(S)	35706	Upload Photo
23 Bowmont Street				55°36′01″N 2°26′04″W	Category B	35709	Upload Photo
9, 11 Bridge Street Robert Swan, Cycle And Sports Depot				55°35′51″N 2°26′02″W	Category B	35715	Upload Photo
27-29 Bridge Street W & M Cockburn				55°35′50″N 2°26′00″W	Category B	35721	Upload Photo
Bridge Street, Kelso Abbey, Monument To The Dukes Of Roxburghe				55°35′49″N 2°25′56″W	Category B	35735	Upload another image
Chalkheugh Terrace Duncan House				55°35′58″N 2°26′11″W	Category B	35741	Upload Photo
Edenside Road Edenside, Stables And Gatepiers				55°36′08″N 2°25′47″W	Category C(S)	35748	Upload Photo
Wooden Estate, Stable Court And Coachhouse Range				55°35′47″N 2°24′43″W	Category B	12953	Upload Photo
Floors Castle				55°36′17″N 2°27′36″W	Category A	10480	Upload Photo
61 Horsemarket				55°35′58″N 2°25′53″W	Category C(S)	35754	Upload Photo
1 Oven Wynd (North Side) And Pettigrew's Property				55°35′53″N 2°26′03″W	Category C(S)	35777	Upload Photo
53 Roxburgh Street				55°35′59″N 2°26′09″W	Category C(S)	35791	Upload Photo
140 Roxburgh Street, Haybank				55°36′07″N 2°26′28″W	Category C(S)	35807	Upload Photo
Roxburgh Street Floors Castle Gates And Gate Lodges				55°36′09″N 2°26′34″W	Category A	35811	Upload another image
3, 4 The Square				55°35′53″N 2°26′00″W	Category C(S)	35830	Upload Photo
8, 9 The Square, Bank Of Scotland				55°35′53″N 2°26′01″W	Category B	35831	Upload another image
23-25 The Square				55°35′54″N 2°26′06″W	Category C(S)	35838	Upload Photo
50, 51, 52 The Square				55°35′55″N 2°26′00″W	Category C(S)	35846	Upload Photo
9-11 Woodmarket				55°35′54″N 2°25′59″W	Category B	35855	Upload Photo
33-35 Woodmarket, The Priory				55°35′56″N 2°25′55″W	Category B	35860	Upload Photo
Abbey Court, Ednam House Hotel, Boundary Walls, Gates And Gatepiers				55°35′48″N 2°26′01″W	Category B	35688	Upload Photo
Bowmont Street Public Library				55°36′00″N 2°26′04″W	Category B	35708	Upload Photo
29 Bowmont Street				55°36′01″N 2°26′07″W	Category C(S)	35710	Upload Photo
Bridge Street, War Memorial				55°35′48″N 2°25′56″W	Category B	35736	Upload another image
Bridge Street, Manse				55°35′48″N 2°25′53″W	Category B	35737	Upload Photo
Broomlands House Walled Gardens				55°36′27″N 2°25′23″W	Category C(S)	35739	Upload Photo
Sydenham House				55°37′18″N 2°25′50″W	Category B	10477	Upload Photo

== Key ==
The scheme for classifying buildings in Scotland is:

- Category A: "buildings of national or international importance, either architectural or historic; or fine, little-altered examples of some particular period, style or building type."
- Category B: "buildings of regional or more than local importance; or major examples of some particular period, style or building type, which may have been altered."
- Category C: "buildings of local importance; lesser examples of any period, style, or building type, as originally constructed or moderately altered; and simple traditional buildings which group well with other listed buildings."

In March 2016 there were 47,288 listed buildings in Scotland. Of these, 8% were Category A, and 50% were Category B, with the remaining 42% being Category C.
