= David Cousin =

Scottish architect (1809–1878)

- Born: 19 May 1809; North Leith, Edinburgh, Scotland
- Died: 14 August 1878 (aged 69); Baton Rouge, United States
- Occupations: architect, town planner, landscape architect
- Style: Neoclassical
- Spouse: Isabella Galloway (m. 1838)
- Children: 3 daughters
David Cousin
- Occupation: Architect
- Design: East Princes Street Gardens; Jeffrey Street, Edinburgh (1868); Chambers Street, Edinburgh (1868); India Buildings, Edinburgh (1862)

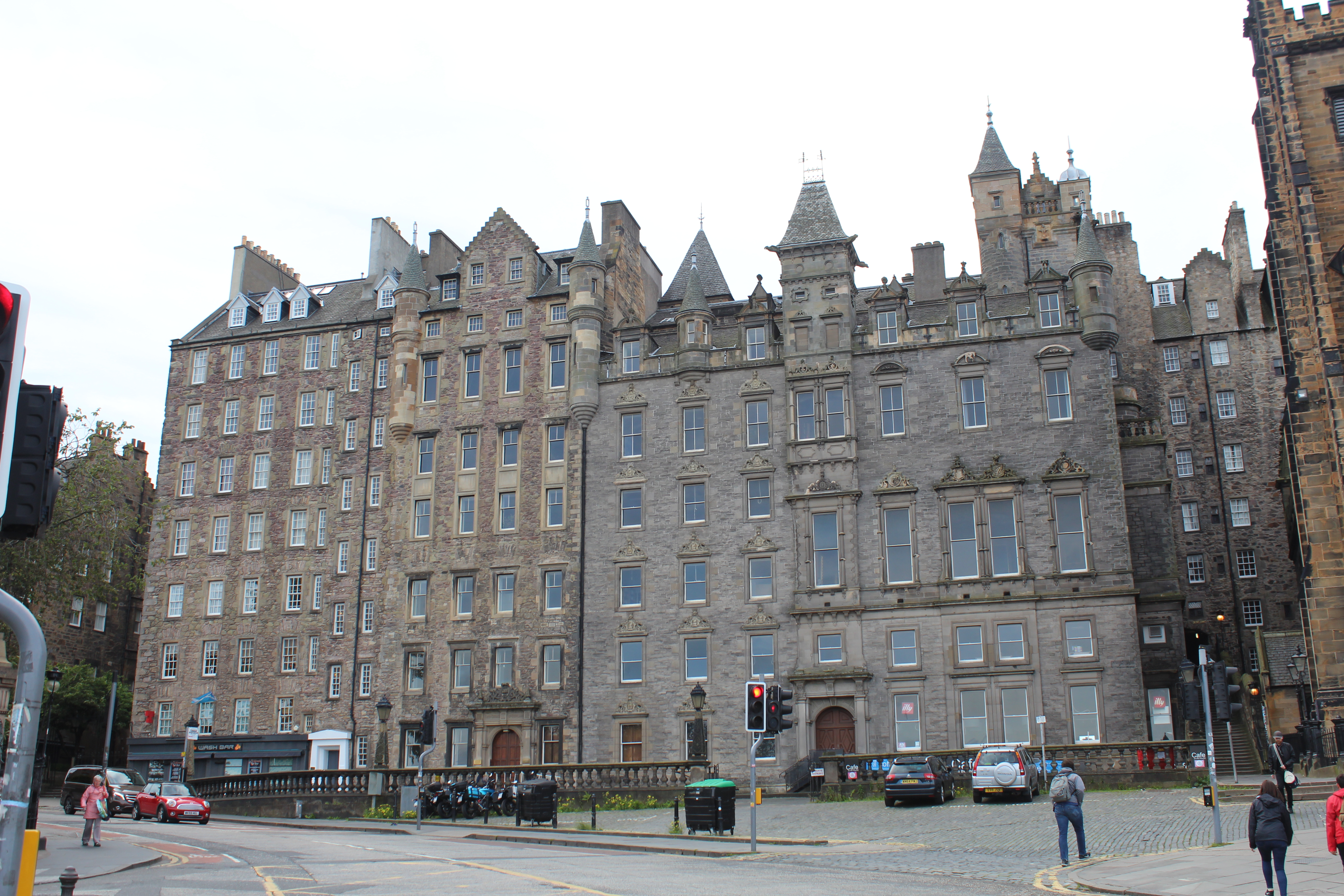
Free Church College and Offices - gifted by Maitland to the Free Church.

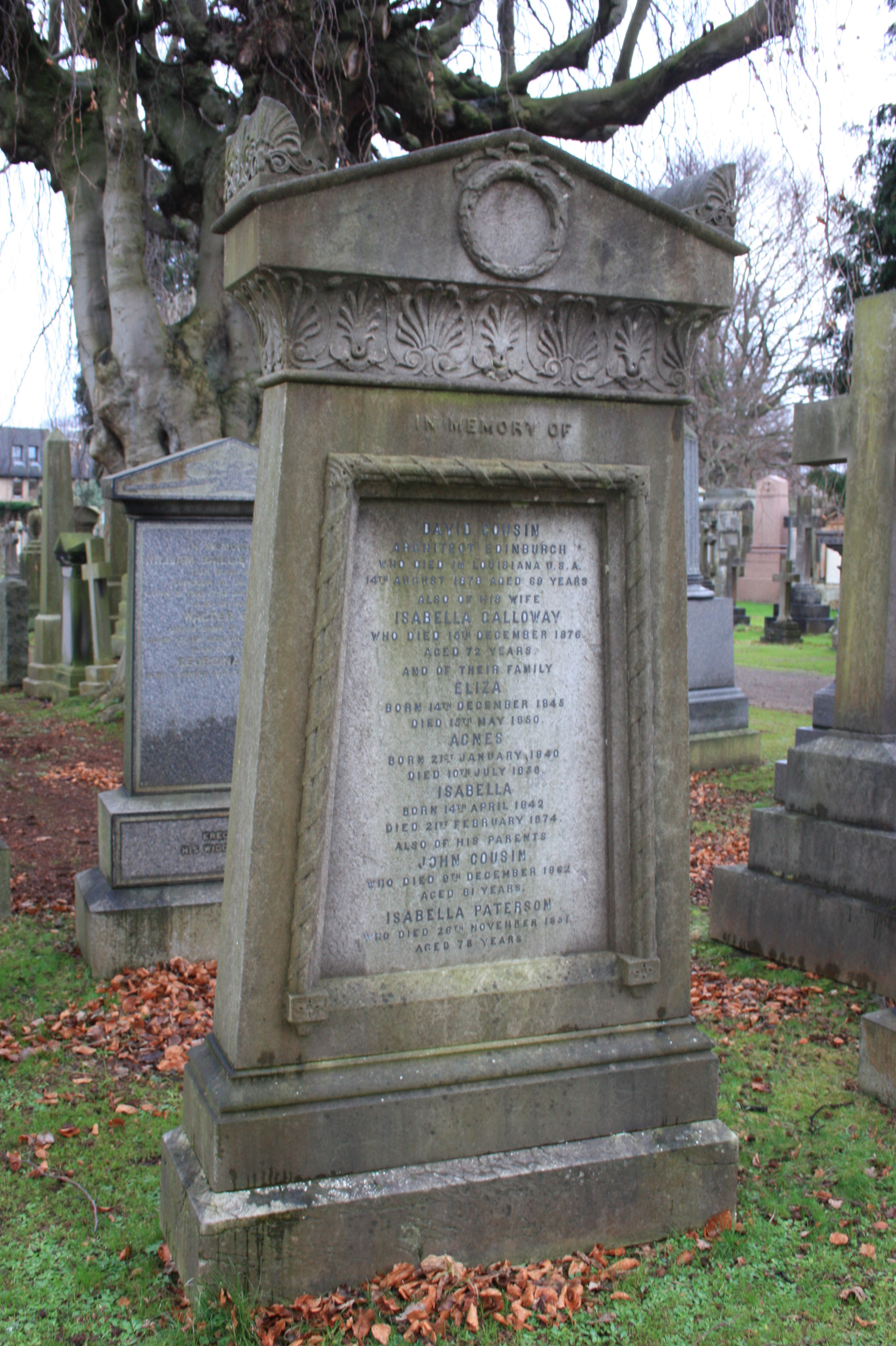
David Cousin's memorial, Dean Cemetery

David Cousin (19 May 1809 – 14 August 1878) was a Scottish architect, landscape architect and planner, closely associated with early cemetery design and many prominent buildings in Edinburgh. From 1841 to 1872 he operated as Edinburgh’s City Superintendent of Works (also known as the City Architect).

== Life ==
Cousin was born in North Leith on 19 May 1809, the son of Isabella Paterson (1773-1851) and John Cousin (1781-1862), and was baptised in North Leith Church.

Initially he trained under his father as a joiner, but went on to study mathematics with Edward Sang. He trained as an architect under William Henry Playfair, Scotland’s most eminent architect of the time, leaving Playfair's practice in 1831 to set up on his own. During this time he competed, but was unsuccessful, in the competition to design the Scott Monument. He established a partnership with Glaswegian engineer William Gale, and together they won two competitions for the design of the West Church in Greenock and the Parish Church at Cambuslang.

In 1841 he was appointed assistant to Thomas Brown, Superintendent of City Works in Edinburgh, replacing him in this role when Brown retired.

During the Disruption of 1843, he left the Church of Scotland and joined the Free Church, after which he received many commissions for the new churches and graveyards that were necessary as a result of the split. He himself was an elder of Pilrig Free Church, which was to his own design and only the second purpose-built church for the Free Church. In the Disruption painting he is shown with John Maitland, holding the plan for the Free Church Offices which he designed and were gifted to the church by Maitland.

He lived and worked at 7 Greenhill Gardens in Edinburgh.

He employed John Chesser at his City Architect's office at 12 Royal Exchange. He also trained John Henderson, Robert Morham and Morham's brother-in-law, John McLachan.

He retired to Louisiana in the United States and died there in Baton Rouge in 1878, aged 69. Although buried in the United States he has a memorial in Dean Cemetery in Edinburgh where the remainder of his family lie, including his wife, Isabella. The memorial stands on the west side of a north-south path, just north of the large Highlanders monument. His brother, George Cousin (1807-1890) a surveyor, lies nearby.

== Family ==
On 23 April 1838 Cousin married Isabella Galloway (1804-1876), the daughter of a tailor. Together they had three daughters however none of them survived to adulthood.

David's brother William Cousin (1812-1883) was a minister in the Free Church of Scotland, latterly in Melrose in the Scottish Borders.

== Cemetery designs and works ==
- Mausoleum for Major Archibald Monteath in Glasgow Necropolis (1842)
- Warriston Cemetery (1842)
- Dean Cemetery (1845)
- Dalry Cemetery (1846)
- Rosebank Cemetery (1846)
- Newington Cemetery (1848)

== Town planning ==
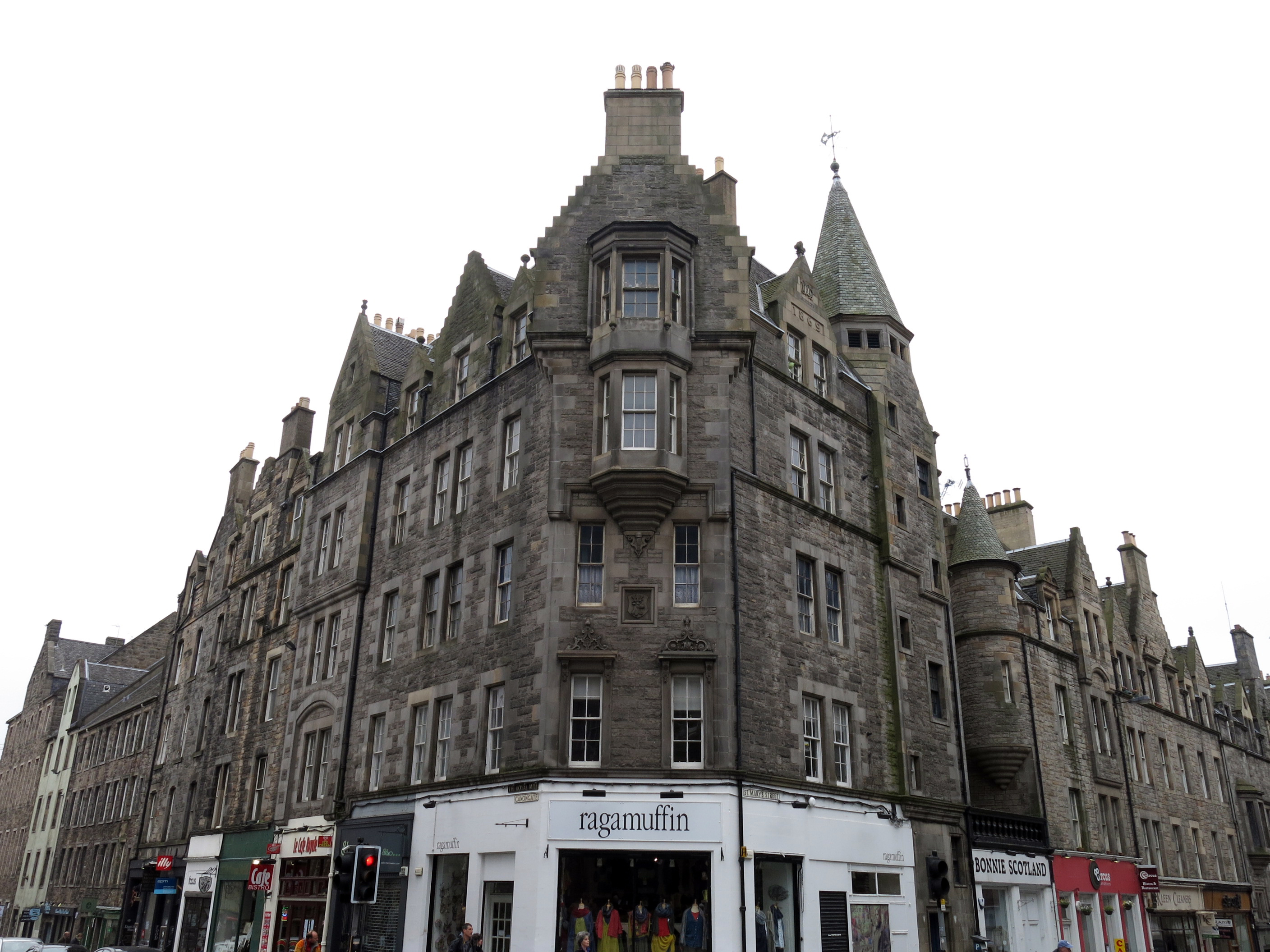
North-east section of St Mary's Street, Edinburgh

- East Princes Street Gardens: terraces, quatrefoil-pierced balustrades and steps (1847)
- Layout of the villas in the Grange estate (1851)
- Layout of the villas in the Mayfield estate (1862)
- St Mary Street Improvement Plan (1868) and detailed design of north-east quarter (1869)
- Blackfriars Street Improvement Plan (1868)
- Jeffrey Street (1868)
- Chambers Street (1868)
- West Savile Road (1877)

== Churches for the Free Church ==
Many of these were done to a standard plan as "temporary" solutions which were later replaced.

- Auchterarder (1843)
- Cramond (1843)
- Kirkcaldy (1843)
- Newington, Edinburgh (1843)
- Pathhead, Kirkcaldy (1843)
- St Andrews, Edinburgh (1843)
- St Devenick’s, Banchory (1843)
- St Georges, Lothian Road, Edinburgh (1843)
- Borgue, Kirkcudbrightshire (1843)
- Dean Village, Edinburgh (1844)
- Kilmarnock (1844)
- Roseneath, Dunbartonshire (1844)
- Saltcoats (1844)
- Kinghorn (1845)
- Oban (1846)
- Free Church Offices (their base) on the Mound in Edinburgh (1858)

== Other works ==
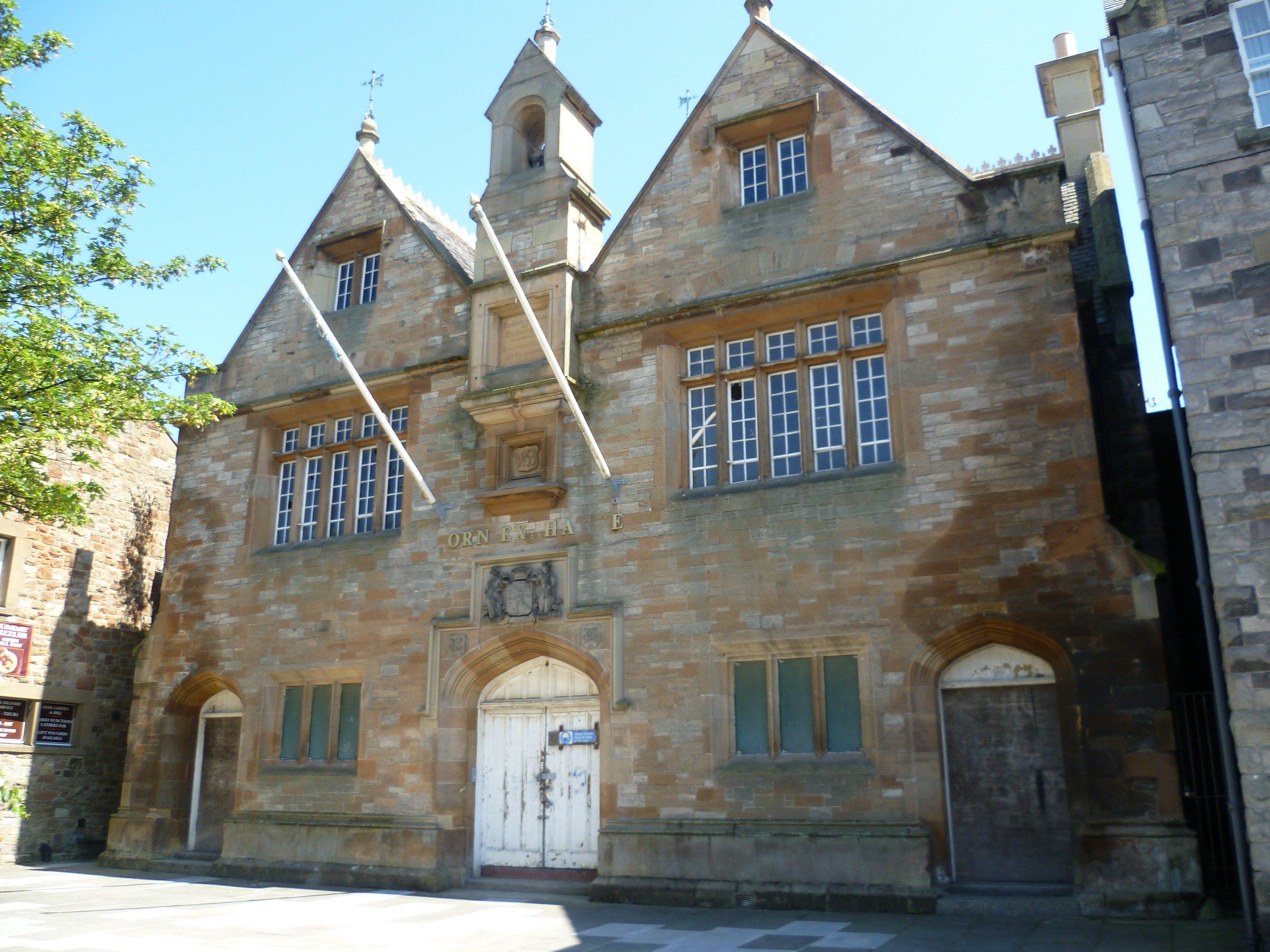
Corn Exchange in Dalkeith

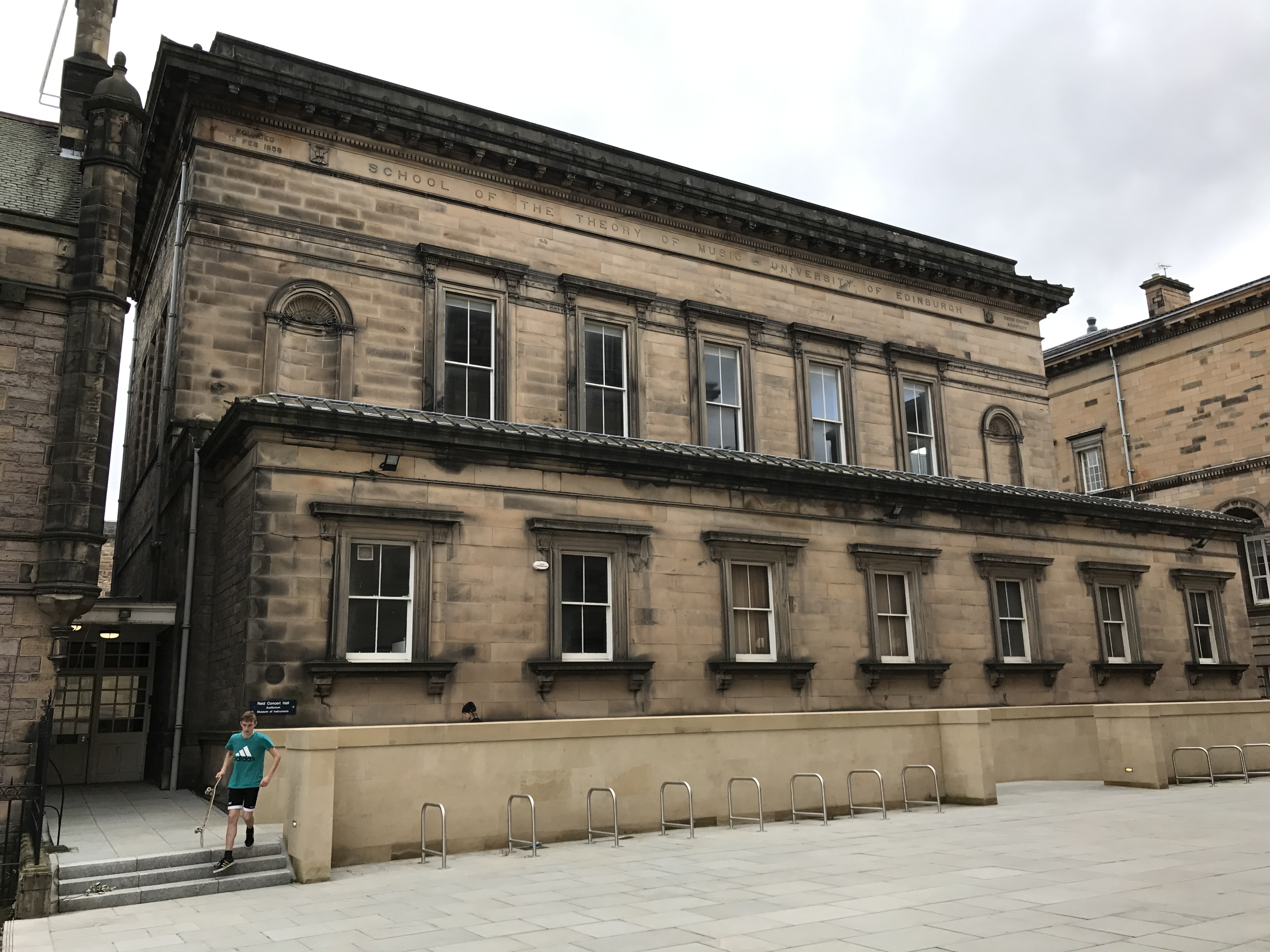
Reid School of Music in Edinburgh

- Cambuslang Parish Church (1839)
- Kingston Church, Glasgow (1839)
- Olrig Parish Church, Caithness (1840)
- Chirnside Bridge Paper Mills (1842)
- Dalrymple Church, Ayrshire (1849)
- Villa at 7 Greenhill Gardens (1849) (for his own home)
- Dalkeith Corn Exchange (1853)
- Kelso Corn Exchange (1855)
- Curriehill House near Currie, Edinburgh (1856)
- The Reid School of Music, Edinburgh (1859)
- St Catharine's Convent, Lauriston Gardens, Edinburgh (1860)
- Melrose Corn Exchange (1862)
- The India Buildings (at head of Victoria Street) (1862)
- Campbeltown Sheriff Court (1871)

== Unbuilt competition entries ==
- Scott Monument (1837)
