= Corn Exchange, Kelso =

Commercial building in Kelso, Scottish Borders, Scotland

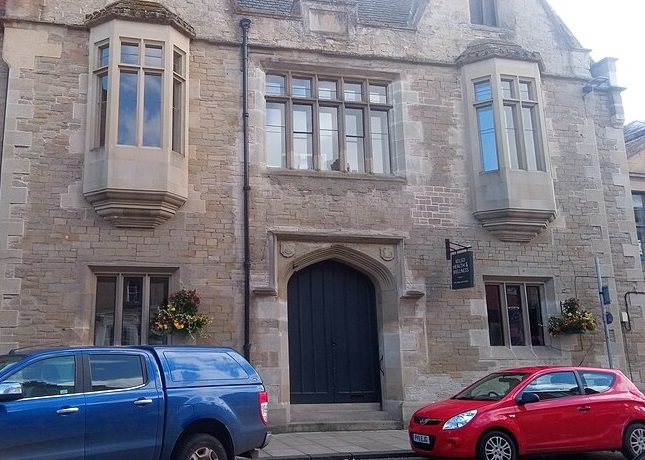
- Corn Exchange, Kelso

- Shown in the Scottish Borders
- 55.5987°N 2.4322°W
- Location: Woodmarket, Kelso

History
- Built: 1856

Site notes
- Architect: David Cousin
- Architectural style: Jacobethan style

Listed Building – Category B
- Official name: Corn Exchange, 29 Woodmarket, Kelso
- Designated: 2 July 1980
- Reference no.: LB35859

The Corn Exchange is a commercial building in Woodmarket, Kelso, Scottish Borders, Scotland. The structure, which accommodates a health clinic, a dental practice and an online publisher, is a Category B listed building.

== History ==
In the mid-18th century, a group of local businessmen decided to form a company to finance and commission a new corn exchange for the town. The site they selected was on the southeast side of Woodmarket, an area where merchants originally traded in timber.

The foundation stone for the new building was in July 1855. It was designed by David Cousin in the Jacobethan style, built in rubble masonry with ashlar stone dressings at a cost of £3,000 and was opened in 1856. The design involved a symmetrical main frontage of three bays facing onto Woodmarket. The central bay featured an arched doorway with an archivolt and a square hood mould on the ground floor and a five-part mullioned and transomed window on the first floor. The outer bays were fenestrated by tri-partite mullioned windows on the ground floor, by oriel windows on the first floor and by bi-partite mullioned windows in the gables above. Internally, the principal room was the main hall, which was 124 feet (38 m) long and 57 feet (17 m) wide, and featured a hammerbeam roof and a gallery.

The building was initially very popular and the directors claimed that "more grain is sold by the grower, in Kelso Corn Exchange, than any other building in Great Britain". However, the use of the building as a corn exchange declined significantly in the wake of the Great Depression of British Agriculture in the late 19th century. Instead, it was used as a venue for agricultural worker hiring fairs where labours could seek work. It accommodated a cinema known as the "Corn Exchange Picture House", which showed silent films from 1917 until shortly before the Second World War. After the war, it became a popular events venue: performers included the rock band, The Move, in June 1967 and the garage rock band, The Troggs, in October 1967.

By the 21st century, the use of the building had changed again with occupants comprising a health centre known as "Kelso Health & Wellness", a dental practice known as "Gentle Touch", and an online publisher known as "Texthouse".

== See also ==
- List of listed buildings in Kelso, Scottish Borders
