= List of listed buildings in Melrose, Scottish Borders =

This is a list of listed buildings in the parish of Melrose in the Scottish Borders, Scotland.

== List ==
| Name | Location | Date Listed | Grid Ref. (Note: Sometimes known as OSGB36, the grid reference (where provided) is based on the British national grid reference system used by the Ordnance Survey. • "Guide to National Grid". Ordnance Survey. • "Get-a-map". Ordnance Survey.) | Geo-coordinates | Notes | LB Number (Note: Historic Environment Scotland assign a unique alphanumeric identifier to each designated site in Scotland, for listed buildings this always begins with "LB", for example "LB12345".) | Image |
|---|---|---|---|---|---|---|---|
| East Port And Scott's Place (Property Belonging To District Council, Formerly Toc-H Rooms Belonging To Mr Neil) | | | | 55°35′49″N 2°43′08″W | Category B | 37766 | Upload Photo |
| Harleyburn Stables | | | | 55°35′44″N 2°44′01″W | Category C(S) | 37768 | Upload Photo |
| Harleyburn Gate-Lodge And Gates | | | | 55°35′47″N 2°44′20″W | Category B | 37769 | Upload Photo |
| High Cross Avenue The Anchorage And Kotagiri | | | | 55°35′57″N 2°43′44″W | Category B | 37776 | Upload Photo |
| High Street, South Side The Pendstead, To Rear Of Ormiston And Renwick Nurserymen | | | | 55°35′51″N 2°43′16″W | Category C(S) | 37779 | Upload Photo |
| High Street, South Side, George And Abbotsford Hotel | | | | 55°35′52″N 2°43′14″W | Category B | 37780 | Upload Photo |
| Tweedmouth Road, "Tweedknowe" And "Tweedmount" | | | | 55°36′02″N 2°43′53″W | Category C(S) | 37806 | Upload Photo |
| 1, Buccleugh Street, K6 Telephone Kiosk At Post Office | | | | 55°35′55″N 2°43′14″W | Category B | 37819 | Upload Photo |
| Buccleuch Street, Abbey Coffee Shop And Flats Over | | | | 55°35′55″N 2°43′12″W | Category C(S) | 37740 | Upload Photo |
| Cloisters Road Abbey Park | | | | 55°35′58″N 2°42′58″W | Category C(S) | 37746 | Upload Photo |
| Buckholm Tower | | | | 55°37′55″N 2°49′23″W | Category A | 19716 | Upload another image |
| Drygrange, Walled Garden | | | | 55°36′36″N 2°40′10″W | Category B | 18836 | Upload Photo |
| Drygrange, South Lodge Including Gates, Gatepiers And Quadrant Walls | | | | 55°36′25″N 2°40′27″W | Category C(S) | 18841 | Upload Photo |
| Hillslap Tower | | | | 55°38′44″N 2°46′30″W | Category B | 15130 | Upload Photo |
| Leadervale House Including Walled Garden | | | | 55°38′49″N 2°41′41″W | Category B | 15148 | Upload Photo |
| Gattonside, The Rigg | | | | 55°36′27″N 2°43′31″W | Category B | 50861 | Upload another image |
| Gattonside, Allerly House Including Stable Block, Garden Wall, Lodge And Gatepiers | | | | 55°36′28″N 2°43′11″W | Category B | 51560 | Upload Photo |
| Newton St Boswells, Auction Mart, Livestock Ring | | | | 55°34′38″N 2°40′15″W | Category B | 51565 | Upload Photo |
| Ravenswood House | | | | 55°35′58″N 2°40′08″W | Category B | 51569 | Upload Photo |
| East Port, North Side, Adjoining Ship Inn Houses Belonging To Mr D C King And Mr J S Crawford | | | | 55°35′49″N 2°43′07″W | Category C(S) | 37765 | Upload Photo |
| High Cross Avenue. Ashby, Melrose And District Abbeyfield | | | | 55°35′56″N 2°43′56″W | Category B | 37778 | Upload Photo |
| High Street, St Mary's Preparatory School 'Hugh Fraser Buildings' | | | | 55°35′58″N 2°43′22″W | Category C(S) | 37792 | Upload Photo |
| Market Square, (South Side) J G Lindsay And Sons And Empty Flats Over | | | | 55°35′49″N 2°43′09″W | Category C(S) | 37795 | Upload Photo |
| Market Square, (North Side) 'Clinkscale Radio And Musical' | | | | 55°35′51″N 2°43′09″W | Category C(S) | 37800 | Upload another image |
| Market Square, (North Side), Bank Of Scotland, J L Crosbie, Newsagent And Tsb | | | | 55°35′51″N 2°43′10″W | Category B | 37801 | Upload another image |
| 3 Market Square, Millars Hotel, (Former Bon Accord Hotel) Incorporating Ground Floor Shop | | | | 55°35′52″N 2°43′11″W | Category B | 37802 | Upload Photo |
| St Mary's Road, Harmony Hall Stables | | | | 55°36′00″N 2°43′16″W | Category C(S) | 37805 | Upload another image |
| Waverley Road, Darnlee | | | | 55°36′10″N 2°44′46″W | Category B | 37810 | Upload Photo |
| Weirhill Place, Weirknowe | | | | 55°36′03″N 2°43′39″W | Category C(S) | 37816 | Upload Photo |
| Buccleuch Street Bellenden | | | | 55°35′54″N 2°43′11″W | Category C(S) | 37742 | Upload Photo |
| Leaderfoot Viaduct | | | | 55°36′16″N 2°40′41″W | Category A | 15145 | Upload another image See more images |
| Chiefswood Road, Former Dingleton Hospital Boiler House Including Boundary Walls | | | | 55°35′28″N 2°43′44″W | Category B | 51064 | Upload another image |
| Ravenswood, Summerhouse | | | | 55°36′02″N 2°39′09″W | Category C(S) | 51573 | Upload Photo |
| Darnick Village No 8 Abbotsford Road (E Side) And Glenmore Cottage (Hastie) | | | | 55°36′03″N 2°44′42″W | Category C(S) | 37750 | Upload Photo |
| Darnick Village Tower Road Darnick Tower | | | | 55°36′03″N 2°44′39″W | Category A | 37756 | Upload another image |
| Darnick Village, Tower Road And Abbotsford Road, Darnick Tower And Garden Walls | | | | 55°36′03″N 2°44′39″W | Category B | 37758 | Upload Photo |
| Dingleton Road, Eildon House (Formerly Rosebank) | | | | 55°35′47″N 2°43′13″W | Category B | 37763 | Upload Photo |
| High Cross Avenue East And West Fordel | | | | 55°36′00″N 2°43′42″W | Category C(S) | 37772 | Upload Photo |
| High Street, (South Side) Church Place | | | | 55°35′57″N 2°43′33″W | Category B | 37787 | Upload Photo |
| Huntly Road, Abbotsknowe | | | | 55°35′56″N 2°43′37″W | Category C(S) | 37793 | Upload Photo |
| Market Square, Corn Exchange And K H Thorburn, Chemist | | | | 55°35′50″N 2°43′11″W | Category B | 37797 | Upload another image |
| Market Square, (South Side) Burt's Hotel | | | | 55°35′50″N 2°43′13″W | Category B | 37799 | Upload another image |
| Waverley Road, 'Old Abbey School' And Boundary Wall To Waverley Road | | | | 55°35′59″N 2°43′52″W | Category C(S) | 37809 | Upload Photo |
| Waverley Road, Tweed Cottage (2 Dwellings) | | | | 55°36′05″N 2°43′57″W | Category B | 37812 | Upload Photo |
| Abbey Street (West Side) 'Clinkscales' | | | | 55°35′51″N 2°43′09″W | Category C(S) | 37731 | Upload Photo |
| Abbey Street, Abbey House | | | | 55°35′56″N 2°43′10″W | Category B | 37733 | Upload Photo |
| Abbey Street, Priorwood, Cottage And Walled Garden, Walls To Prior's Walk And Abbey Street | | | | 55°35′54″N 2°43′07″W | Category C(S) | 37735 | Upload another image See more images |
| Buccleuch Street, Post Office | | | | 55°35′55″N 2°43′13″W | Category C(S) | 37738 | Upload Photo |
| Melrose Bridge | | | | 55°36′18″N 2°45′00″W | Category B | 19719 | Upload Photo |
| Drygrange, Former Steading (Including 1 And 2 Drygrange Cottages And Drygrange Stables Cottage) | | | | 55°36′44″N 2°40′21″W | Category B | 18838 | Upload Photo |
| Abbotsford Including House, Walled Gardens And Courtyards, Conservatory, Bothies, Game Larder, Ice House, Terraces, Gate Lodge, Boundary Walls, Gardener's Cottage, Stable Block, Garden Statuary And All Other Ancillary Structures | | | | 55°35′58″N 2°46′56″W | Category A | 15104 | Upload another image |
| Huntlyburn With Walled Garden And Bothy, Former Stables, Cottage And Mounting Block | | | | 55°35′37″N 2°44′47″W | Category B | 15105 | Upload Photo |
| Darnick Village Abbotsford Road (E Side) Tower Cottage | | | | 55°36′04″N 2°44′37″W | Category B | 37749 | Upload Photo |
| Darnick Village Tower Road Darnick Tower Ruined Tower | | | | 55°36′01″N 2°44′39″W | Category B | 37757 | Upload Photo |
| Darnick Village Tower Road Aldie Cottage | | | | 55°36′00″N 2°44′30″W | Category C(S) | 37760 | Upload Photo |
| Dingleton Road Station Hotel | | | | 55°35′49″N 2°43′10″W | Category C(S) | 37761 | Upload Photo |
| Harley Burn | | | | 55°35′44″N 2°44′05″W | Category B | 37767 | Upload Photo |
| High Cross Avenue, St. Cuthbert's Rc Church | | | | 55°35′56″N 2°43′50″W | Category B | 37777 | Upload Photo |
| High Street, (South Side) The Shoe Shop | | | | 55°35′53″N 2°43′18″W | Category C(S) | 37783 | Upload Photo |
| High Street, (South Side) Elliotlea And Booklaws | | | | 55°35′58″N 2°43′34″W | Category C(S) | 37789 | Upload Photo |
| Buccleuch Street St Margarets (Borders Regional Council Special Educational Services And Countryside Ranger) | | | | 55°35′55″N 2°43′14″W | Category C(S) | 37737 | Upload Photo |
| Chain Bridge | | | | 55°36′10″N 2°43′24″W | Category B | 37744 | Upload another image |
| Drygrange, North Lodge (Former Factor's House) Including Gates, Gatepiers And Enclosing Walls | | | | 55°36′51″N 2°40′38″W | Category C(S) | 18840 | Upload Photo |
| Drygrange Old Bridge | | | | 55°36′14″N 2°40′32″W | Category A | 15106 | Upload another image See more images |
| Gattonside, Abbotsmeadow Including Walled Garden | | | | 55°36′28″N 2°43′24″W | Category C(S) | 15147 | Upload Photo |
| Newtown St Boswells, Melbourne Place And Railway Court, Railway Hotel Including Railings | | | | 55°34′35″N 2°40′17″W | Category C(S) | 47392 | Upload Photo |
| Newton St Boswells, Tweedside Road, Newton House Including Boundary Wall | | | | 55°34′35″N 2°40′10″W | Category C(S) | 51567 | Upload Photo |
| Darnick Village Smith's Road The Gables | | | | 55°35′59″N 2°44′41″W | Category C(S) | 37754 | Upload Photo |
| Darnick Village Smith's Road Darnick Dairies | | | | 55°35′58″N 2°44′42″W | Category C(S) | 37755 | Upload Photo |
| High Street, (South Side) The Kings Arms Hotel | | | | 55°35′53″N 2°43′16″W | Category B | 37781 | Upload Photo |
| High Street, (South Side) Borders Regional Council Social Work Department | | | | 55°35′54″N 2°43′20″W | Category C(S) | 37784 | Upload Photo |
| High Street (South Side) 'Choice Furnishers' And West End House | | | | 55°35′55″N 2°43′21″W | Category C(S) | 37785 | Upload Photo |
| High Street, (South Side) Douglas Cottage | | | | 55°35′58″N 2°43′35″W | Category C(S) | 37790 | Upload Photo |
| Melrose Railway Station | | | | 55°35′48″N 2°43′14″W | Category A | 37803 | Upload Photo |
| Tweedmouth Road, St Cuthbert's Manse | | | | 55°36′04″N 2°43′54″W | Category C(S) | 37807 | Upload Photo |
| 8 Weirhill Place | | | | 55°36′02″N 2°43′39″W | Category C(S) | 37815 | Upload Photo |
| Melrose Abbey 'The Cloisters' | | | | 55°35′58″N 2°43′01″W | Category C(S) | 37730 | Upload Photo |
| Abbey Street, (West Side) Former Town House (Army Cadet Corps) | | | | 55°35′52″N 2°43′09″W | Category C(S) | 37732 | Upload Photo |
| Buccleuch Street Dunfermline House | | | | 55°35′54″N 2°43′12″W | Category C(S) | 37743 | Upload Photo |
| Wooplaw House | | | | 55°40′06″N 2°47′44″W | Category B | 19115 | Upload Photo |
| Drygrange, No 4 Drygrange Stable Cottages (House To North Of Steading) | | | | 55°36′45″N 2°40′21″W | Category C(S) | 18839 | Upload Photo |
| Appletree Leaves Former Stable And Remains Of Ladhope Tower | | | | 55°37′16″N 2°48′14″W | Category C(S) | 15102 | Upload Photo |
| Gattonside House Including Chapel, Former Coach House, Cottage, Walled Garden And Boundary Walls | | | | 55°36′20″N 2°44′07″W | Category B | 15103 | Upload Photo |
| Pavilion (Incorporating 1 Pavilion, The Clock House, Stables House And Ruaival Cottage) | | | | 55°36′32″N 2°44′59″W | Category C(S) | 15133 | Upload Photo |
| Leaderfoot Bridge | | | | 55°36′15″N 2°40′17″W | Category B | 15146 | Upload Photo |
| Chapel On Leader Stables Including Garden Cottage, Water Tower, Boundary Walls, Railings, Gatepiers And Gates | | | | 55°39′56″N 2°42′03″W | Category C(S) | 50606 | Upload Photo |
| Gattonside, Bakers Road, Hassendean Cottage | | | | 55°36′19″N 2°43′42″W | Category B | 51562 | Upload Photo |
| Gattonside House, East Lodge Including Gatepiers | | | | 55°36′21″N 2°44′15″W | Category C(S) | 51563 | Upload Photo |
| Ravenswood, Stables | | | | 55°35′59″N 2°40′17″W | Category C(S) | 51572 | Upload Photo |
| The Roan Including Cottage And Walled Garden | | | | 55°41′09″N 2°42′53″W | Category C(S) | 51574 | Upload Photo |
| Darnick Village Abbotsford Road (W Side) West House | | | | 55°36′02″N 2°44′42″W | Category C(S) | 37753 | Upload Photo |
| Dingleton Road Mavisbank | | | | 55°35′46″N 2°43′09″W | Category B | 37762 | Upload Photo |
| High Cross Avenue Mansefield | | | | 55°36′00″N 2°43′40″W | Category C(S) | 37771 | Upload Photo |
| High Street, (North Side.) Abbey Park, St Mary's Preparatory School | | | | 55°35′59″N 2°43′19″W | Category B | 37791 | Upload Photo |
| Market Square, Market Cross | | | | 55°35′50″N 2°43′10″W | Category A | 37794 | Upload another image See more images |
| Market Square, (South Side) The Ormiston | | | | 55°35′50″N 2°43′12″W | Category B | 37798 | Upload Photo |
| Waverley Castle Hotel, Including Original Lamp Standards And Statue Of Sir Walter Scott | | | | 55°36′12″N 2°44′34″W | Category B | 37808 | Upload Photo |
| Weirhill, Eildon Bank | | | | 55°36′00″N 2°43′37″W | Category C(S) | 37813 | Upload Photo |
| Weirhill Place, Weirhill Cottage | | | | 55°36′02″N 2°43′40″W | Category C(S) | 37817 | Upload Photo |
| Weirhill Place, Ellwood | | | | 55°36′01″N 2°43′40″W | Category C(S) | 37818 | Upload Photo |
| Market Square, K6 Telephone Kiosk | | | | 55°35′50″N 2°43′10″W | Category B | 37820 | Upload Photo |
| Melrose Abbey Former Brewery Warehouse Now Store | | | | 55°35′58″N 2°43′00″W | Category C(S) | 37728 | Upload Photo |
| Melrose Abbey Commendators House | | | | 55°36′00″N 2°43′06″W | Category B | 37729 | Upload another image |
| Drygrange House (Grangehall Care Home, Formerly St Andrew's College) Including Garden Terrace Walls To South | | | | 55°36′39″N 2°40′18″W | Category B | 18835 | Upload Photo |
| Chiefswood, Including Monks Well, Bridge And Walled Garden | | | | 55°35′38″N 2°44′30″W | Category B | 15107 | Upload Photo |
| Eildon, Nos 1, 2 And 3 Greenwells Cottages | | | | 55°34′47″N 2°41′43″W | Category C(S) | 51559 | Upload Photo |
| Gattonside, Bakers Road, Achnachairidh | | | | 55°36′20″N 2°43′51″W | Category B | 51561 | Upload Photo |
| Gattonside Toll | | | | 55°36′21″N 2°44′57″W | Category C(S) | 51564 | Upload Photo |
| Newton St Boswells, Newtown Parish Church (Church Of Scotland) Including Boundary Walls And Railings (Former United Presbyterian) | | | | 55°34′32″N 2°40′00″W | Category C(S) | 51566 | Upload Photo |
| Newton St Boswells, Tweedside Road, Taynuilt Including Garage, Gatepiers And Boundary Walls | | | | 55°34′36″N 2°40′03″W | Category C(S) | 51568 | Upload Photo |
| Darnick Village Abbotsford Road (E Side) Gate House | | | | 55°36′03″N 2°44′41″W | Category C(S) | 37751 | Upload Photo |
| Darnick Village Tower Road House (Virginia Cottage) | | | | 55°36′01″N 2°44′37″W | Category C(S) | 37759 | Upload Photo |
| East Port The Ship Inn | | | | 55°35′49″N 2°43′08″W | Category C(S) | 37764 | Upload Photo |
| High Cross Avenue Holy Trinity Episcopal Church | | | | 55°35′58″N 2°43′53″W | Category B | 37775 | Upload Photo |
| High Street, (South Side) A Dalgetty And Sons | | | | 55°35′53″N 2°43′17″W | Category C(S) | 37782 | Upload Photo |
| High Street, (South Side) St Dunstan's House | | | | 55°35′55″N 2°43′22″W | Category C(S) | 37786 | Upload Photo |
| St Cuthbert's Parish Church, Weirhill | | | | 55°36′02″N 2°43′35″W | Category B | 37804 | Upload Photo |
| Waverley Road, St Helen's | | | | 55°36′14″N 2°44′14″W | Category A | 37811 | Upload Photo |
| Abbey Street, (East Side) Clinkscales Organ Studio | | | | 55°35′51″N 2°43′08″W | Category C(S) | 37734 | Upload Photo |
| Chain Bridge Farm Former Toll-House | | | | 55°36′08″N 2°43′23″W | Category B | 37745 | Upload Photo |
| Drygrange, Summerhouse | | | | 55°36′36″N 2°40′12″W | Category C(S) | 18837 | Upload Photo |
| Chapel On Leader House, Walled Garden | | | | 55°39′54″N 2°42′06″W | Category C(S) | 50607 | Upload Photo |
| Eildon Hall: East Lodge Including Gatepiers | | | | 55°35′10″N 2°40′55″W | Category C(S) | 51557 | Upload Photo |
| Eildon Hall, Garden House And Walled Garden | | | | 55°34′57″N 2°41′57″W | Category C(S) | 51558 | Upload Photo |
| Threepwood House Including Stable, Cartshed And Boundary Walls | | | | 55°40′35″N 2°46′45″W | Category C(S) | 51575 | Upload Photo |
| Darnick Village Aldie Crescent Aldie And Lower Aldie | | | | 55°35′58″N 2°44′33″W | Category C(S) | 37748 | Upload Photo |
| Darnick Village Abbotsford Road Darnick Cottage | | | | 55°36′00″N 2°44′38″W | Category C(S) | 37752 | Upload Photo |
| Harmony Hall | | | | 55°36′00″N 2°43′13″W | Category B | 37770 | Upload another image See more images |
| High Cross Avenue Weirdlaw | | | | 55°35′59″N 2°43′44″W | Category C(S) | 37773 | Upload Photo |
| High Cross Avenue Holy Trinity Rectory | | | | 55°35′58″N 2°43′51″W | Category B | 37774 | Upload Photo |
| High Street, (South Side) Westhill | | | | 55°35′58″N 2°43′33″W | Category B | 37788 | Upload Photo |
| Market Square, (South Side) Branch Library And Flat, (Guthrie) | | | | 55°35′50″N 2°43′11″W | Category C(S) | 37796 | Upload another image |
| Weirhill, Weirhill House And 1 Weirhill Place | | | | 55°36′00″N 2°43′38″W | Category C(S) | 37814 | Upload Photo |
| Melrose Abbey | | | | 55°35′57″N 2°43′05″W | Category A | 37726 | Upload another image |
| Melrose Abbey Doocot And Byre Range Adjoining | | | | 55°36′01″N 2°43′06″W | Category B | 37727 | Upload another image |
| Buccleuch Street St Mary's School (Buccleuch House) | | | | 55°35′55″N 2°43′15″W | Category B | 37736 | Upload Photo |
| Buccleuch Street, Braidwood | | | | 55°35′55″N 2°43′12″W | Category C(S) | 37739 | Upload Photo |
| Buccleuch Street Runcie | | | | 55°35′54″N 2°43′14″W | Category C(S) | 37741 | Upload Photo |
| Cloisters Road Abbey Parks Gatepiers | | | | 55°35′58″N 2°42′59″W | Category C(S) | 37747 | Upload Photo |
| Friar's Hall | | | | 55°36′24″N 2°42′59″W | Category B | 19718 | Upload Photo |
| Eildon Hall Including Stable Block | | | | 55°35′00″N 2°41′48″W | Category B | 15134 | Upload Photo |
| Ravenswood, North Lodge Including Gates And Railings | | | | 55°36′01″N 2°40′18″W | Category B | 51570 | Upload Photo |
| Ravenswood, South Lodge | | | | 55°35′51″N 2°40′16″W | Category C(S) | 51571 | Upload Photo |
| Whitelee House, By Galashiels | | | | 55°38′43″N 2°51′03″W | Category C(S) | 51576 | Upload Photo |

== Key ==
The scheme for classifying buildings in Scotland is:

- Category A: "buildings of national or international importance, either architectural or historic; or fine, little-altered examples of some particular period, style or building type."
- Category B: "buildings of regional or more than local importance; or major examples of some particular period, style or building type, which may have been altered."
- Category C: "buildings of local importance; lesser examples of any period, style, or building type, as originally constructed or moderately altered; and simple traditional buildings which group well with other listed buildings."

In March 2016 there were 47,288 listed buildings in Scotland. Of these, 8% were Category A, and 50% were Category B, with the remaining 42% being Category C.
