= Kelso Town Hall =

Municipal building in Kelso, Scotland

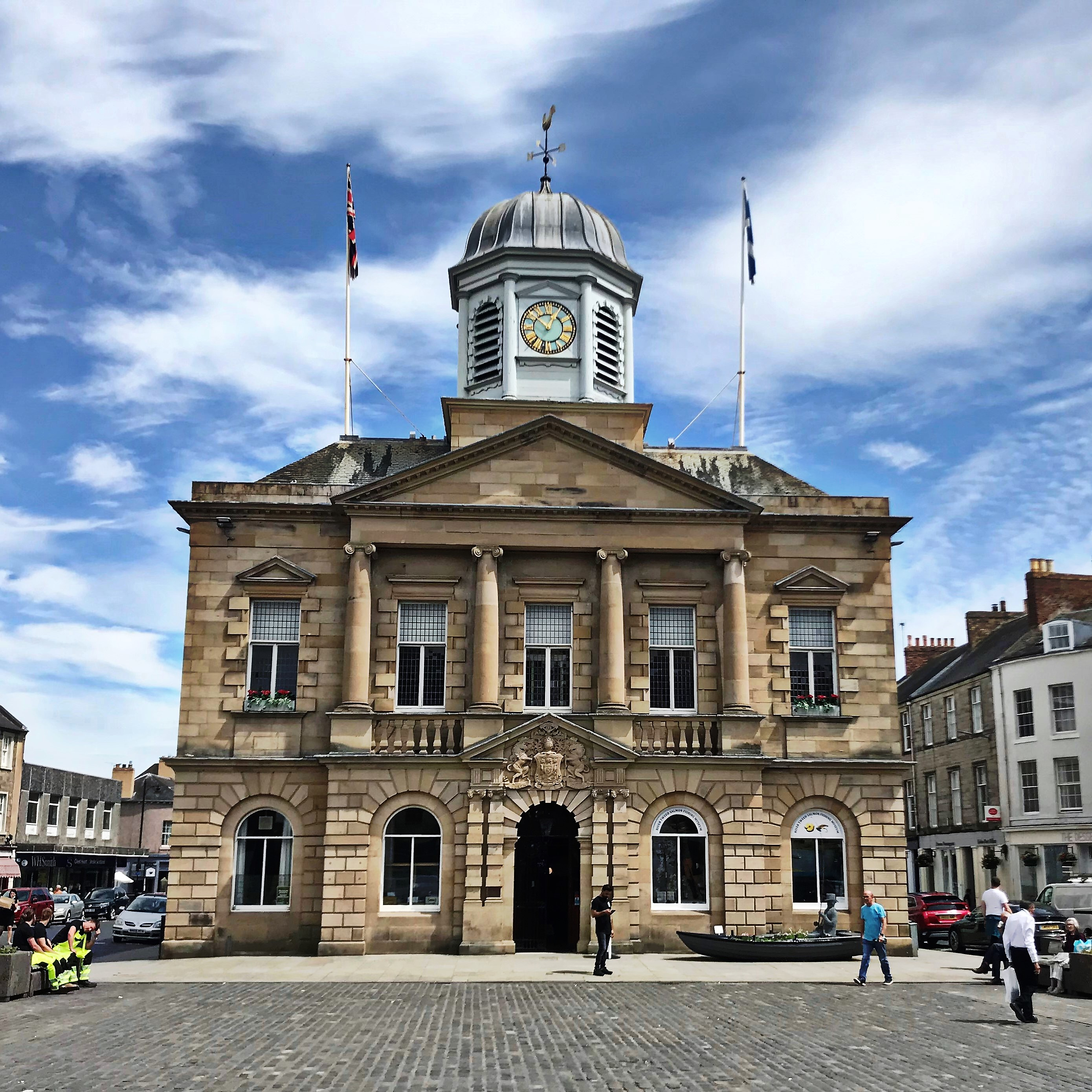
- Kelso Town Hall

- Shown in Scottish Borders
- 55.5985°N 2.4336°W
- Location: The Square, Kelso

History
- Built: 1816

Site notes
- Architect(s): John Daniel Swanston and William Syme
- Architectural style: Baroque Revival style

Listed Building – Category B
- Official name: The Square, Kelso Town Hall
- Designated: 16 March 1971
- Reference no.: LB35828

Kelso Town Hall is a municipal building in The Square, Kelso, Scotland. The building, which was the headquarters of Kelso Burgh Council, is a Category B listed building.

== History ==
The first municipal building in Kelso was a tolbooth which dated back to the 1670s. It had a tall tower on the southwest side and, like other buildings in Kelso, it was originally thatched and was almost certainly badly damaged in the fire which destroyed much of the town in 1684. By the early 19th century the tolbooth was in a ruinous condition and the burgh leaders initiated a campaign by public subscription to raise money for its replacement, for which the 5th Duke of Roxburghe, whose seat was at Floors Castle, provided the site and donated the majority of the money.

The foundation stone for the new building was laid by the 5th Duke of Roxburghe on 20 March 1816. It was designed in the neoclassical style, built in ashlar stone and was completed later in the year. The design involved a symmetrical main frontage with five bays facing onto The Square; the ground floor was originally open, so that markets could be held, with an assembly room on the first floor. On the first floor elevation, there was an Ionic order portico which slightly projected forward and was surmounted by an entablature and a modillioned pediment and, at roof level, there was a balustrade and large octagonal cupola with a dome. A clock, donated by a London-based clockmaker, Alexander Purvis, was added to the cupola in 1841. In the mid-19th century there was a daily market for "fish, flesh and cabbage".

The 8th Duke of Roxburghe transferred ownership of the building to the burgh council in 1902, and it was re-modelled by John Daniel Swanston and William Syme in the Baroque Revival style at a cost of £3,000 between 1902 and 1908. The remodelling works included the enclosure of the ground floor and the creation of a central round headed doorway flanked by banded pilasters supporting an open pediment with the burgh coat of arms in the tympanum, as well as the elevation of the columns of the first floor portico onto pedestals and their detachment from the walls, and the removal of the roof level balustrade.

The town hall continued to serve as the headquarters of the burgh council for much of the 20th century, but ceased to be the local seat of government when the enlarged Roxburgh District Council was formed at Hawick in 1975. It instead became the meeting place of Kelso Community Council; a programme of refurbishment works was completed in 1996 and the ground floor became occupied by the local registry office and the local team from Visit Scotland. A piece of public art, sculpted by Jake Harvey and entitled the "Kelsae Stane", was unveiled in front of the town hall in July 2014, and the River Tweed Salmond Fishing Museum, featuring a 31 kilograms (68 lb) salmon caught by the 7th Earl of Home in 1735, was established in the town hall in September 2020.

== See also ==
- List of listed buildings in Kelso, Scottish Borders
