= Corn Exchange, Melrose =

Commercial building in Melrose, Scotland

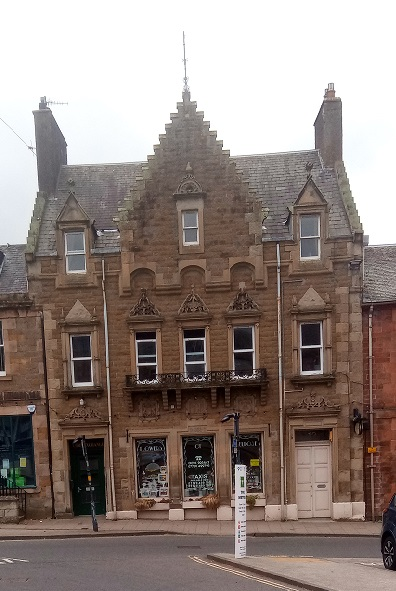
- Corn Exchange, Melrose

- Shown in the Scottish Borders
- 55.5971°N 2.7198°W
- Location: Market Square, Melrose

History
- Built: 1863

Site notes
- Architect: David Cousin
- Architectural style: Jacobethan style

Listed Building – Category B
- Official name: Market Square, Corn Exchange and K. H. Thorburn, Chemist
- Designated: 19 February 1981
- Reference no.: LB37797

The Corn Exchange is a commercial building in the Market Square in Melrose, Scottish Borders, Scotland. The structure, which is now used as a public events venue, is a Category B listed building.

== History ==
In the early 1860s, a group of local businessmen decided to form a company to finance and commission a corn exchange for the town. The site they selected was on the southwest side of the Market Square.

The new building was designed by David Cousin in the Jacobethan style, built in rubble masonry with ashlar stone dressings at a cost of £3,000, and was opened in autumn 1863. The design involved a symmetrical main frontage of five bays facing onto the Market Square. The central section of three bays featured three square headed shop openings with hood moulds on the ground floor, three sash windows with strapwork pediments and a balcony on the first floor, and a large stepped gable, containing a small rectangular window, above. The outer bays contained doorways on the ground floor, sash windows with colonettes and finials on the first floor, and dormer windows above. Internally, the principal room was the main hall, which was 66 feet (20 m) long and 31 feet (9.4 m) wide.

After her death in 1869, a plaque was installed in the building to commemorate the life of the local songwriter, Elizabeth Clephane, who wrote the hymns "The Ninety and Nine" and "Beneath the Cross of Jesus". The use of the building as a corn exchange declined significantly in the wake of the Great Depression of British Agriculture in the late 19th century. Instead, it was re-purposed as a public events venue: in spring 1941, during the Second World War, the building hosted concert parties for 18th Infantry Division which was billeted in the local area.

The building became a popular concert venue in the 1960s: performers at that time included Robert Plant and the Band of Joy. The journalist, Kate Adie, spoke at the corn exchange in November 2008, and, after a major refurbishment, in September 2021, Arabella Weir, became the first comedian to perform on the stage following the re-opening of the building.

== See also ==
- List of listed buildings in Melrose, Scottish Borders
