= John Maitland (accountant) =

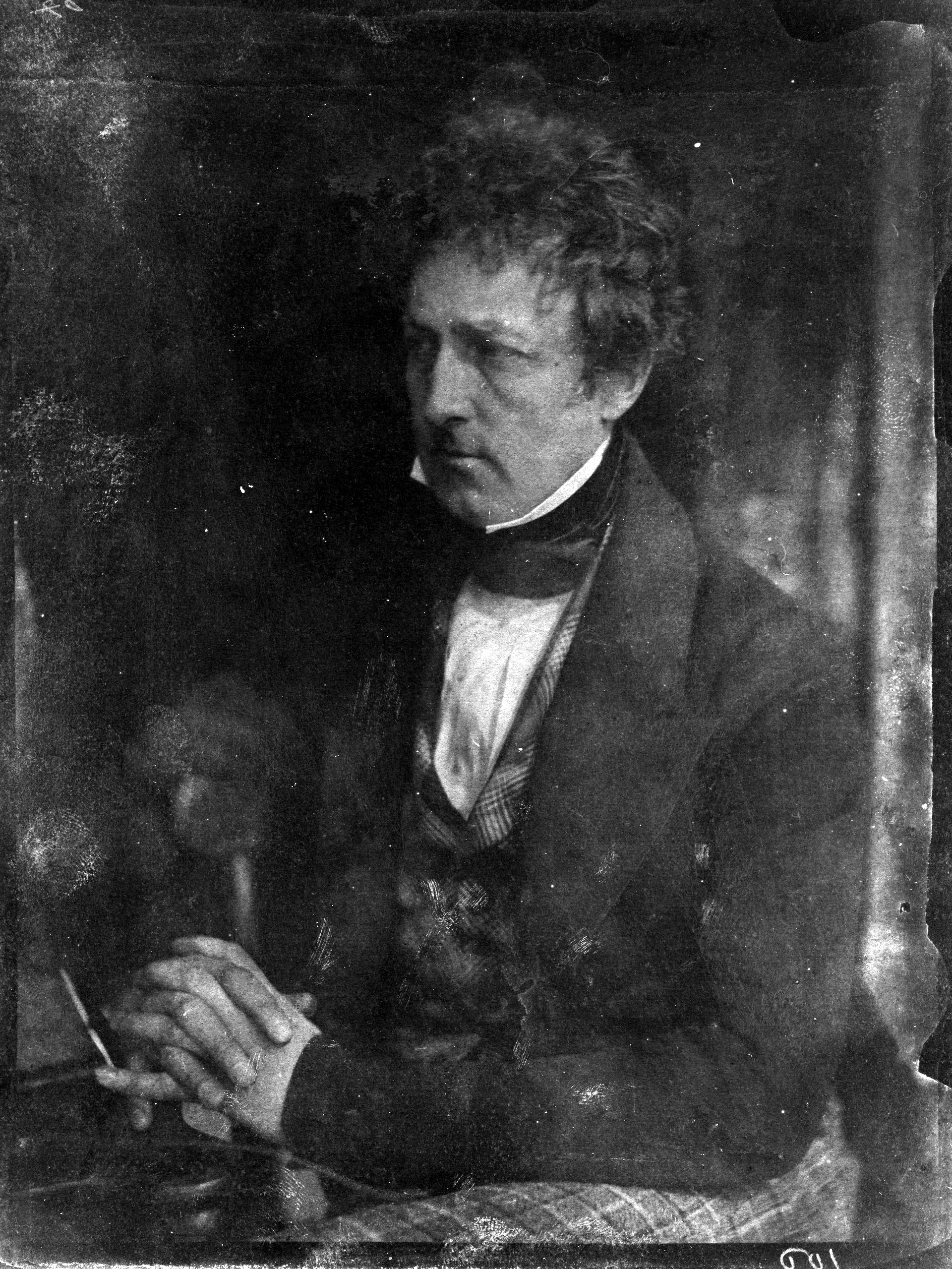
- John Maitland by Hill & Adamson

Personal details
- Born: 17 January 1803
- Died: 6 September 1865 (aged 62)

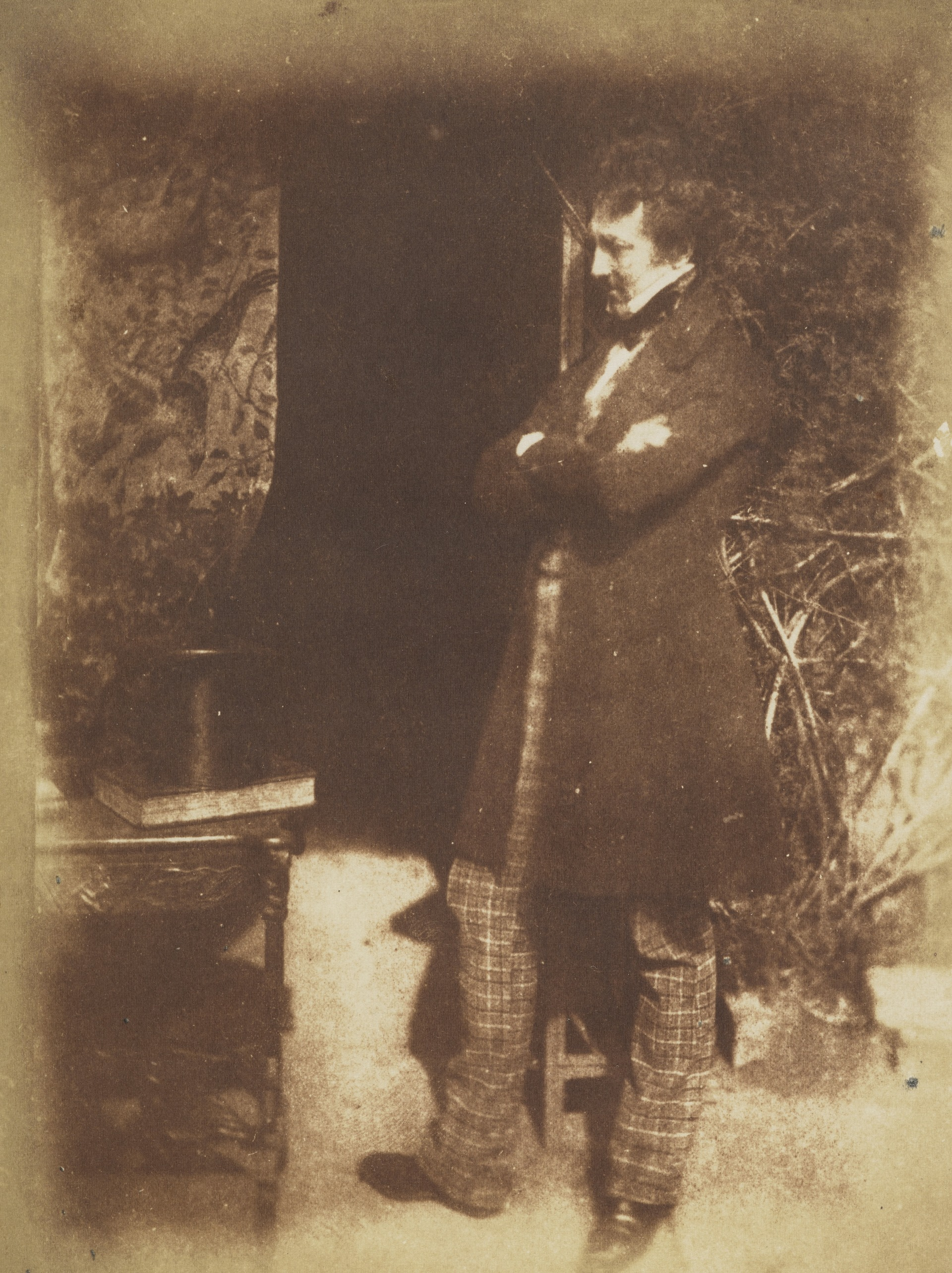
John Maitland (1803-1865) by Hill & Adamson

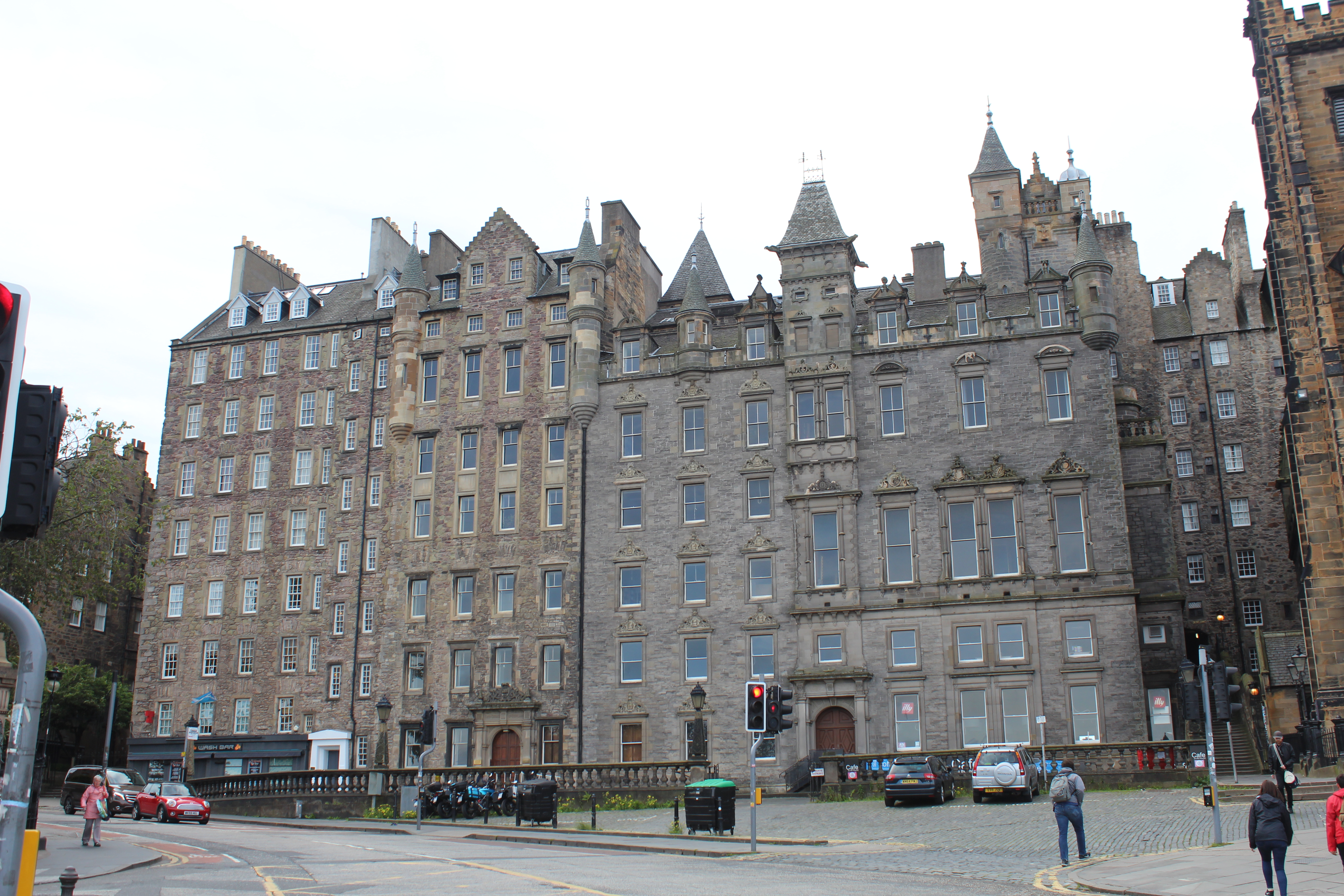
Free Church College and Offices - gifted by Maitland to the Free Church.

John Maitland (17 January 1803 - 6 September 1865) filled the position of Accountant to the Court of Session for several years. He took a deep interest in religious schemes, especially those of the Free Church, to which he belonged. He presented to the Free Church the premises in North Bank Street, Edinburgh, occupied by them as a Presbytery hall and mission offices, the only compensation he received being the chambers vacated by them in Frederick Street. In many other respects he was a liberal donor to the schemes of the Free Church; and, as a leading elder, had for many years a seat in the General Assembly of that denomination. Mr Maitland was for a considerable number of years a partner of Mr William Wood. He became a member of the Society of Accountants at its origin in 1853. He was a director of the Commercial Bank of Scotland, and of other public corporations.

== Early life ==
John Maitland was the sixth son of Sir Alexander Gibson Maitland, Baronet of Clifton Hall, county of Edinburgh, he was born on 17 January 1803. When the time came for choosing a profession, he became an accountant in Edinburgh. Latterly he was associated in business with his future brother-in-law, Mr William Wood, C.A., a gentleman of like mind and kindred tastes. Mr Maitland took a deep interest and a very influential part in the organization and development of the National Security Savings Bank. By devising a method whereby all the numerous small accounts of such useful institutions could be brought annually to an exact balance, he solved a difficulty which had previously stood in the way of their success, and made the Edinburgh Savings Bank a model for others throughout the country.

== Church leadership ==
Maitland became a deacon in 1843, and in 1846 an elder, in Free St George’s, Edinburgh, and being thus in the centre of affairs, was enabled to render much effective service. He gave careful thought to the general Sustentation Fund and other financial departments of the Church. He authored several pamphlets, outlining principles of distribution which rendered the Sustentation Scheme successful. This public support seems to have lost him friends, particularly in the upper classes of society, with whom he had been associated by family relationship.

== Accountant to the Court of Session ==
In the year 1850, when the public office of accountant to the Court of Session was created, he was nominated by the Crown to fill it. He filled the position for fifteen years, until the day of his death. His public responsibilities did not preclude the performance of those duties which devolved upon him as a private Christian and an office-bearer in the Church. Although frequently a member of the General Assembly, he was not in the habit of addressing the house.

== Other activities ==
He was a director of the Commercial Bank and of the North British Insurance Company. His also gave his time to numerous other projects for example the Home Mission operations of the Free Church. In the building of churches, of manses, of schools, he took a very warm interest.

== Free Church Offices ==
A few years before his death, Mr Maitland built, in close proximity to the New College, premises for the various offices of the Church. Although the Church handed over to him the former less suitable offices in Frederick Street in part exchange, this gift, erected primarily at his own expense, must have cost him between five and six thousand pounds at nineteenth century value.

Robert Candlish records in his memoirs:

At the meeting of the Commission of Assembly in November, Dr. Candlish adverted to a proposal of Mr. John Maitland, into whose hands the old burned tenement at the head of the Mound had fallen, "to build and fit up premises there, suitable for the offices of the Free Church, and to place them at the disposal of the Church, on no other condition than this, that the proceeds of the sale of our present offices in Frederick Street be handed over to him." It is almost needless to say that Mr. Maitland's very generous offer was gratefully accepted, and in due time the offices of the Church were transferred to the place now occupied by them.

A portrait of Maitland, by Mr Norman Macbeth, was hung the Presbytery Hall; and another portrait, in full length, by Sir John Watson Gordon, was placed in the principal room of the adjoining National Security Savings Bank.

== Final illness, death and legacy ==
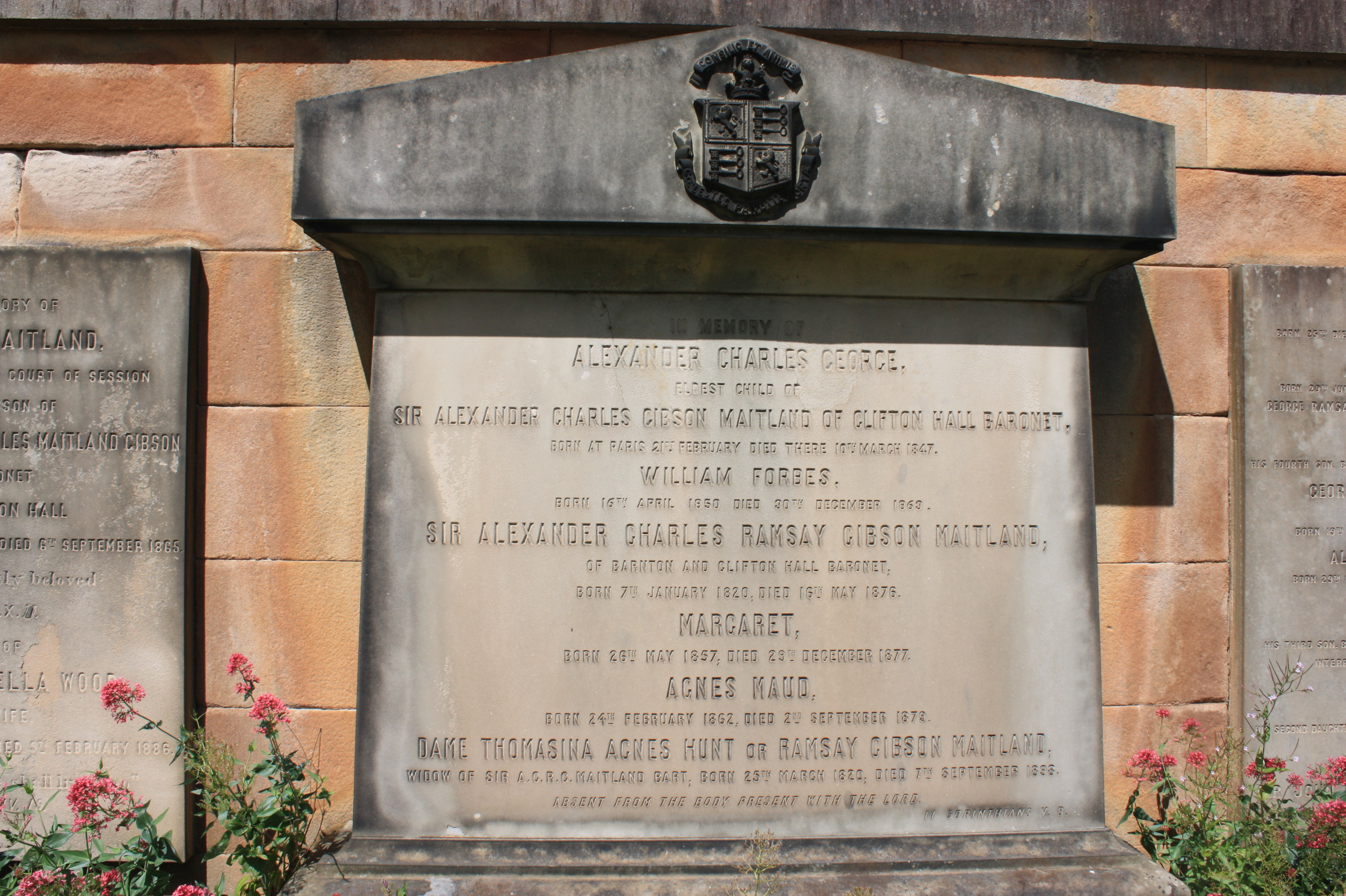
Grave of Sir Alexander Charles Gibson Maitland. John Maitland's stone is partially covered on the left

Mr Maitland’s last illness was a rapid one, and, as he usually enjoyed good health, and seemed to possess a robust constitution, his death came with sudden and stunning surprise on his numerous friends and the public at large as mentioned in several obituaries. On Tuesday, 29 August 1865, he attended to his official duties in apparent health. Returning in the afternoon to his residence—that summer at Swinton Bank, near Peebles—he complained of what, for the three following days, appeared to be influenza. On Saturday, however, this illness assumed a more serious aspect; and, with occasional interruptions of his consciousness, he sank beneath the attack, and on Wednesday, 6 September, died. He was buried in the Grange Cemetery, near the grave of Chalmers, by the north wall. His headstone gives dates which agree with Disruption Worthies rather than the dates in Burke's Peerage. William S. Anderson, College Curator and Office Caretaker, dedicated his A Guide to the Free Church of Scotland College and Offices to John Maitland. It also features Maitland's portrait from the Disruption painting on the front cover showing Maitland holding the plan of the Free Church Offices with Mr David Cousin, the architect. The Guide also has a photograph of Norman MacBeth's painting of Maitland on page 32.

== Family ==
He married Mary Isabella Wood, daughter of John Philip Wood, on 9 November 1852.
