= Kelso, Scottish Borders =

Market town in the Scottish borders

Coordinates: 55.59851°N 2.43357°W

Kelso
- Town
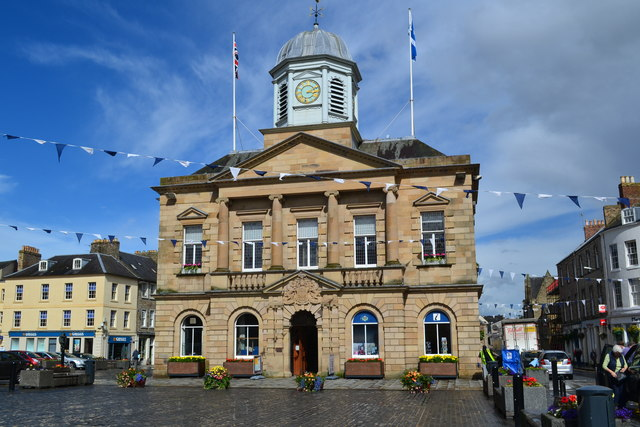
- Kelso Town Hall

- Location within the Scottish Borders
- Population: 7,023 (2022)
- OS grid reference: NT7268233961
  - Edinburgh: 44 mi (71 km)
  - London: 350 mi (560 km)
- Council area: Scottish Borders
- Lieutenancy area: Roxburgh, Ettrick and Lauderdale
- Country: Scotland
- Sovereign state: United Kingdom
- Post town: KELSO
- Postcode district: TD5
- Dialling code: 01573
- Police: Scotland
- Fire: Scottish
- Ambulance: Scottish
- UK Parliament: Berwickshire, Roxburgh and Selkirk
- Scottish Parliament: Ettrick, Roxburgh and Berwickshire

Kelso is a historic market town in the Scottish Borders area of Scotland. Within the boundaries of the historic county of Roxburghshire, it lies where the rivers Tweed and Teviot have their confluence. The town had a population of 7,023 in 2022.

Kelso's main tourist attractions are the ruined Kelso Abbey and Floors Castle. The latter is a house designed by William Adam, which was completed in 1726. The Kelso Bridge was designed by John Rennie, who later built the Waterloo Bridge in London.

== History ==
The town of Kelso came into being as a direct result of the creation of Kelso Abbey in 1128. The town's name stems from the earliest settlement having stood on a chalky outcrop, and the town was known as Calkou (or perhaps Calchfynydd) in those early days, something that is remembered in the modern street name, "Chalkheugh Terrace".

Standing on the opposite bank of the River Tweed from the now-vanished royal burgh of Roxburgh, Kelso and its sister hamlet of Wester Kelso were linked to the burgh by a ferry at Wester Kelso. A small hamlet existed before the completion of the abbey in 1128 but the settlement started to flourish with the arrival of the monks. Many were skilled craftsmen, and they helped the local population as the village expanded.

Archaeological excavations in the 1980s discovered that the original medieval burgh of Wester Kelso was much farther west than previously believed and that it was abandoned in the 14th or 15th centuries, at the same time that the royal burgh of Roxburgh was deserted, likely the result of the English occupation of Roxburgh Castle. The other settlement of Easter Kelso, near the abbey, survived and expanded from the market area around the abbey northwards towards the Floors estate by the early 18th century. According to archaeologist D. R. Perry, "it is not clear whether the two settlements merged or Wester Kelso ceased to exist."

The abbey controlled much of life in Kelso-area burgh of barony, called Holydean, until the Reformation in the 16th century. After that, the power and wealth of the abbey declined. The Kerr family of Cessford took over the barony and many of the abbey's properties around the town. By the 17th century, they virtually owned Kelso.

In Roxburgh Street is the outline of a horseshoe petrosomatoglyph where the horse of Charles Edward Stuart cast a shoe as he was riding it through the town on his way to Carlisle in 1745. He is also said to have planted a white rosebush in his host's garden, descendants of which are still said to flourish in the area.

Kelso Two Pennies Scots Act 1802
- Act of Parliament
- Parliament of the United Kingdom
- Long title: An Act for continuing and enlarging the Term and Powers of Two several Acts, of the Thirty-second Year of the Reign of His late Majesty, and of the Twentieth Year of His present Majesty, charging a Duty of Two-pennies Scots, or One Sixth Part of a Penny Sterling, upon every Scots Pint of Ale, Porter, and Beer, brewed for Sale, brought into, tapped, or sold, within the Town and Parish of Kelso, in the County of Roxburgh, for the Purposes therein mentioned.
- Citation: 42 Geo. 3. c. xxxiii

Dates
- Royal assent: 30 April 1802

Other legislation
- Repealed by: Statute Law (Repeals) Act 2013

Status: Repealed

Text of statute as originally enacted

For some period of time, the Kelso parish was able to levy a tax of two pennies Scots on every Scottish pint of ale, beer or porter sold within the town. The power to do this was extended for 21 years under the Kelso Two Pennies Scots Act 1802 (42 Geo. 3 c. 33) when the money was being used to replace a bridge across the River Tweed that had been destroyed by floods.

Kelso Town Hall was completed in 1816 and remodelled in 1908. The Corn Exchange, which now accommodates a health clinic, a dental clinic and an online publisher, was completed in 1856, and the war memorial was erected in 1921 to a design by Sir Robert Lorimer.

== Geography ==
Kelso held the UK record for the lowest January temperature at −26.7 °C (−16.1 °F), from 1881 until 1982.

== Community ==
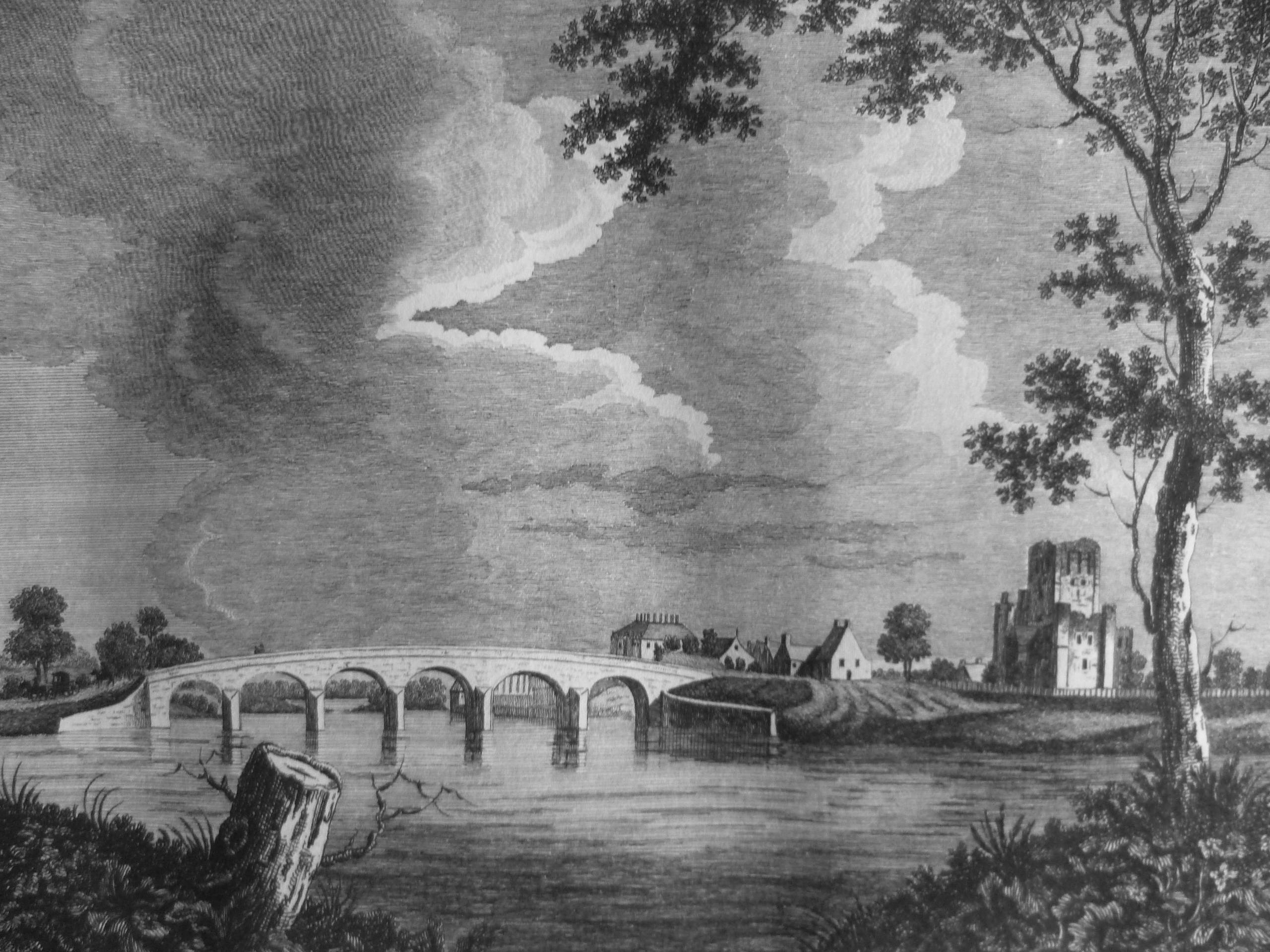
View of Kelso in the late 18th century

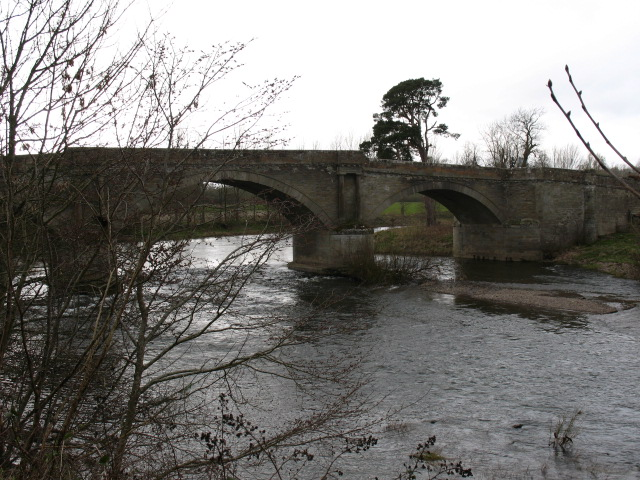
Teviot Bridge Near Kelso

Kelso High School provides secondary education to the town, and primary education is provided by Edenside Primary and Broomlands Primary.

The River Tweed at Kelso is renowned for its salmon fishing. There are two eighteen-hole golf courses as well as a National Hunt (jumping) horse racing track. Kelso Racecourse is known as "Britain's Friendliest Racecourse". Racing first took place in Kelso in 1822.

In 2005, the town hosted the "World Meeting of Citroën 2CV Friends" in the grounds of nearby Floors Castle.

Kelso Community Council is made up of 12 Community Councillors, who remain in office for 4 years per term. The post of Chairman and Town Provost is currently held by Gavin Horsburgh, in his second term, until October 2029.

The town's rugby union club is Kelso RFC. The club holds an annual rugby sevens tournament takes place in early May. Former players include Ross Ford, the current record holder for men's senior caps with the Scotland men's rugby union team. Other former players include John Jeffrey, Roger Baird, Andrew Ker and Adam Roxburgh, who all featured in sevens teams that dominated the Borders circuit in the 1980s, including several wins in the blue ribbon event at Melrose. Kelso RFC also hold an annual rugby fixture; this fixture is the oldest unbroken fixture between a Scottish and Welsh side.

Every year in July, the town celebrates the border tradition of Common Riding, known as Kelso Civic Week. The festival lasts a full week and is headed by the Kelsae Laddie with his Right and Left Hand Men. The Laddie and his followers visit neighbouring villages on horseback with the climax being the Yetholm Ride on the Saturday. Kelso hosts its annual fair on the first weekend of September. The festivities include dancing, street entertainers, live music, stalls and a free concert. The fair attracts about 10,000 people to the town.

== People ==
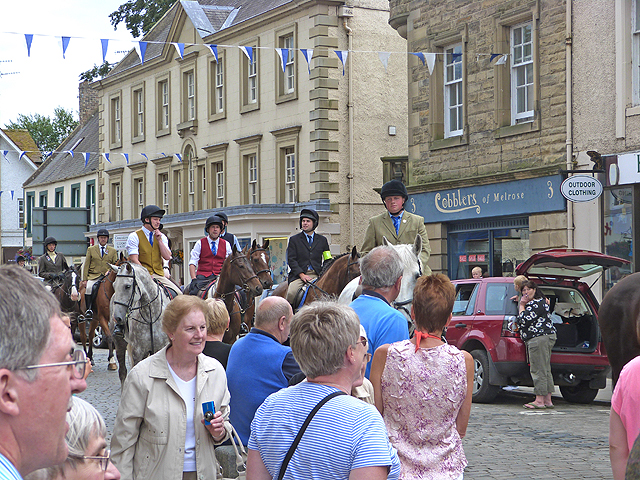
Horsemen riding the marches of Kelso

Sir Walter Scott attended Kelso Grammar School in 1783 and he said of the town: "it is the most beautiful if not the most romantic village in Scotland". Another attraction is the Cobby Riverside Walk which goes from the town centre to Floors Castle along the banks of the Tweed passing the point where it is joined by the River Teviot. Kelso has two bridges that span the River Tweed, "Rennie's Bridge" was completed in 1803 to replace an earlier one washed away in the floods of 1797, it was built by John Rennie of Haddington, who later went on to build Waterloo Bridge in London, his bridge in Kelso is a smaller and earlier version of Waterloo Bridge. The bridge was the cause of local rioting in 1854 when the Kelso population objected to paying tolls even when the cost of construction had been covered, the Riot Act was read, three years later tolls were abolished. Hunter's Bridge, a kilometre downstream, is a modern construction built to divert vehicles around the town and so take much of the heavy traffic that has damaged Rennie's bridge.

Famous people from Kelso have included the suffragette Georgiana Solomon who was born here in 1844, the civil engineer Sir James Brunlees (1816–1892) who constructed many railways in the United Kingdom as well as designing the docks at Avonmouth and Whitehaven. Sir William Fairbairn (1789–1874) was another engineer who built the first iron hulled steamship the Lord Dundas and constructed over 1,000 bridges using the tubular steel method which he pioneered. Thomas Pringle the writer, poet and abolitionist, was born at nearby Blakelaw, a 500-acre (2.0 km^{2}) farmstead four miles (6 km) to the south of the town where his father was the tenant. Donald Farmer, a Victoria Cross recipient, was born in Kelso.

== Notable people ==
- James Ballantyne, printer
- Horatius Bonar, poet and hymn writer
- Jane Lundie Bonar (1821–1884), hymnwriter
- Sir James Brunlees, engineer
- Peter Crawford, land surveyor
- Sir William Fairbairn, engineer
- Donald Farmer, Victoria Cross recipient
- Ross Ford, former rugby union player
- John Jeffrey, former rugby union player
- Alistair Moffat, journalist
- Tom Nevin, boxer
- Scott Newlands, Rugby Union
- Will H. Ogilvie (1869–1963), poet
- Oscar Onley, cyclist
- Sir Matthew Pinsent, rower
- Thomas Pringle (1789–1834), poet, writer, activist, regarded as the father of South African poetry.
- Sir William Purves, banker
- Alan Tait, dual rugby international
- Adam Roxburgh, former rugby union player
- Sir Walter Scott, writer
- Robert Smith, physicist
- Jane T. Stoddart, writer and editor
- Jennie Kidd Trout, Canadian Physician, the first woman in Canada to practice medicine, born in Kelso
- James Thomson, poet and composer
- William Glass (1786–1853), founder of The Settlement on Tristan da Cunha

== Film, music and literature ==
Much of the 1984 film Greystoke: The Legend of Tarzan, Lord of the Apes was filmed on location at Floors Castle in Kelso, which featured as the fictional Greystoke Manor.

Kelso features in the traditional folk music ballad 'The Shepherd Lad of Kelso', as well as 'The Old Woman of Kelso', a variation of the ballad Eggs and Marrowbone.

== Floors Castle ==
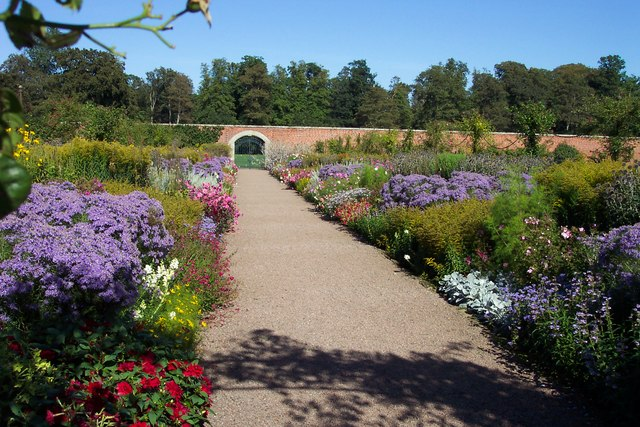
Walled garden at Floors Castle

Floors Castle is a large stately home built in the 1720s just outside of Kelso. It is a visitor attraction. Adjacent to the house there is a large walled garden with a cafe, a small garden centre and the Star Plantation.

== Media ==
Local news and television programmes are provided by BBC Scotland and ITV Border. Television signals are received from the Selkirk TV transmitter.

Kelso's local radio stations are BBC Radio Scotland on 93.5 FM and Greatest Hits Radio Scottish Borders and North Northumberland on 96.8 FM.

The local newspapers are the Southern Reporter and the Border Telegraph.

== Twin towns ==
Kelso is twinned with two cities abroad:

- - Kelso, Washington, United States
- - Orchies, Nord, France

== Panorama ==
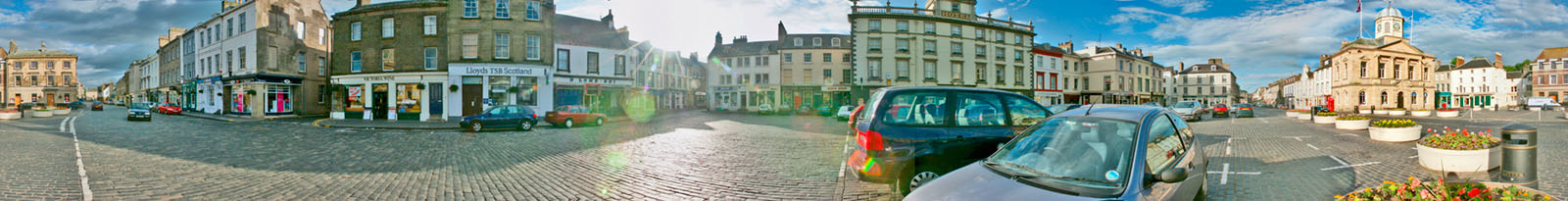
Kelso is unique in Scotland for having a cobbled square fed by four cobbled streets

== See also ==
- Kelso High School
- Kelso Hospital
